= Joint Implementation =

Joint Implementation (JI) is one of three flexibility mechanisms set out in the Kyoto Protocol to help countries with binding greenhouse gas emissions targets (the Annex I countries) meet their treaty obligations. Under Article 6, any Annex I country can invest in a project to reduce greenhouse gas emissions in any other Annex I country (referred to as a "Joint Implementation Project") as an alternative to reducing emissions domestically. In this way countries can lower the costs of complying with their Kyoto targets by investing in projects where reducing emissions may be cheaper and applying the resulting Emission Reduction Units (ERUs) towards their commitment goal.

A JI project might involve, for example, replacing a coal-fired power plant with a more efficient combined heat and power plant. Most JI projects are expected to take place in the economies in transition (the EIT Parties) noted in Annex B of the Kyoto Protocol. Currently Russia and Ukraine are slated to host the greatest number of JI projects.

Unlike the case of the Clean Development Mechanism, the JI has caused less concern of spurious emission reductions, as the JI project, in contrast to the CDM project, takes place in a country which has a commitment to reduce emissions under the Kyoto Protocol.

The process of receiving credit for JI projects is somewhat complex. Emission reduction projects are awarded credits called Emission Reduction Units (ERUs), which represents an emission reduction equivalent to one tonne of CO_{2} equivalent. The ERUs come from the host country's pool of assigned emissions credits, known as Assigned Amount Units, or AAUs. Each Annex I party has a predetermined amount of AAUs, calculated on the basis of its 1990 greenhouse gas emission levels. By requiring JI credits to come from a host country's pool of AAUs, the Kyoto Protocol ensures that the total amount of emissions credits among Annex I parties does not change for the duration of the Kyoto Protocol's first commitment period.

== Projects ==
The formal crediting period for JI was aligned with the first commitment period of the Kyoto Protocol, and did not start until January 2008 (Carbon Trust, 2009, p. 20). In November 2008, only 22 JI projects had been officially approved and registered. By 2012, it is expected that the total number of ERUs generated by JI will be around 300 million. This estimate is based on values taken from project plans, and makes no adjustment to account for delivery in practice.

Russia accounts for about two-thirds of these projected savings, with the remainder divided up roughly equally between Ukraine and the EU's New Member States. Emission savings include cuts in methane, HFC, and N_{2}O emissions.

In December 2012, ERU prices crashed to a low of 15c before recovering to 23c after news that EU’s Climate Change Committee was to vote on a ban of ERUs from countries that have not signed up to a second commitment period under the Kyoto Protocol. In January 2013, Bloomberg reported that Emission Reduction Unit prices declined 89 percent in the 2012 year.

== See also ==
- Assigned amount units
- Emission Reduction Unit
- Removal Units
- Certified Emission Reduction
- Clean Development Mechanism
- Flexible Mechanisms
- Obtaining ownership of land by productive use

The Third Period ( Phase three ) of the EU - Ts is expected to start by the end of 2012 The future of the JI is expected to be decided by the committee of the UNFFCC.
