= Emissions reduction =

Emissions reduction can refer to:

- Climate change mitigation
- Air pollution control

== See also ==
- Certified emission reduction
- Emission reduction unit
