= Mitsubishi i-MiEV =

Five-door hatchback electric city car

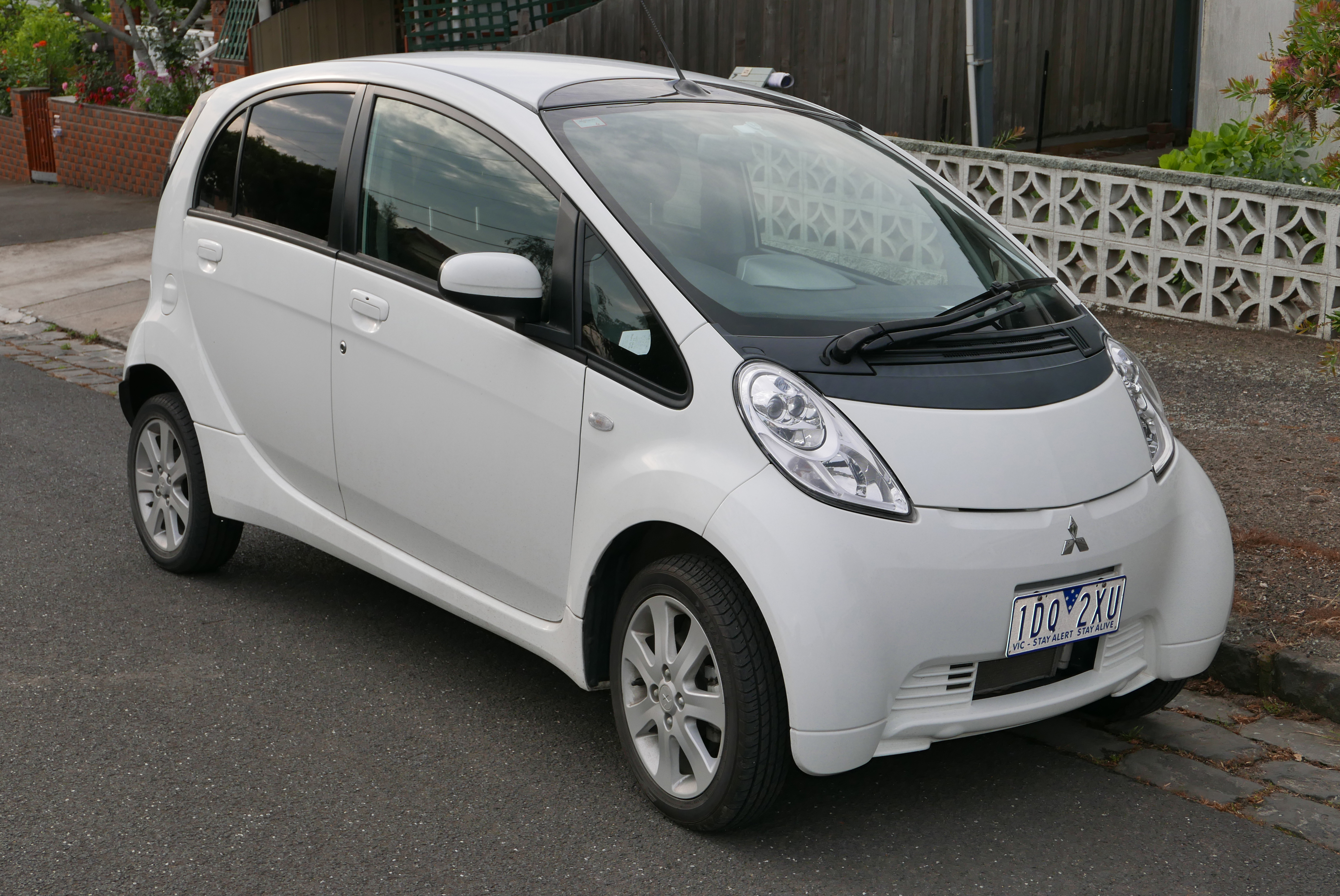

Overview
- Manufacturer: Mitsubishi Motors
- Also called: Peugeot iOn (Europe); Citroën C-Zero (Europe); Mitsuoka Like
- Production: 2009–2021; 2009–2014 (Europe)
- Assembly: Japan: Kurashiki, Okayama (Mizushima Plant)

Body and chassis
- Class: Kei car (Japan); City car (outside Japan)
- Body style: 5-door hatchback
- Layout: RMR
- Related: Mitsubishi i Mitsubishi Minicab MiEV

Powertrain
- Electric motor: 47 kW (63 hp), 180 N⋅m (133 lbf⋅ft) permanent-magnet motor
- Transmission: Single speed reduction gear
- Battery: 16 kWh / 58 MJ (Li-ion battery)
- Range: 160 km (99 mi) (Japanese cycle); 100 km (62 mi) (US EPA cycle)
- Plug-in charging: 15 A 240 V AC (3.6 kW) on the SAE J1772-2009 inlet, optional CHAdeMO DC rapid charging, adapters for domestic AC sockets (110–240 V)

Dimensions
- Wheelbase: 2,550 mm (100.4 in)
- Length: 3,395 mm (133.7 in); 3,480 mm (137.0 in) (Japan 2018-2021); 3,680 mm (144.9 in) (North America)
- Width: 1,475 mm (58.1 in); 1,585 mm (62.4 in) (North America)
- Height: 1,600 mm (63.0 in); 1,615 mm (63.6 in) (North America)
- Curb weight: 1,080 kg (2,380 lb)

Chronology
- Predecessor: Mitsubishi i
- Successor: Mitsubishi eK X EV (Japan); Citroën Ami (Europe)

The Mitsubishi i-MiEV (MiEV is an acronym for Mitsubishi innovative Electric Vehicle) is a five-door electric city car produced in the 2010s by Mitsubishi Motors, and is the electric version of the Mitsubishi i. Rebadged variants of the i-MiEV are also sold by PSA as the Peugeot iOn and Citroën C-Zero, mainly in Europe. The i-MiEV was the world's first modern highway-capable mass production electric car.

The i-MiEV was launched for fleet customers in Japan in July 2009, and on April 1, 2010, for the wider public. International sales to Asia, Australia and Europe started in 2010, with further markers in 2011 including Central and South America. Fleet and retail customer deliveries in the U.S. and Canada began in December 2011. The American-only version is larger than the Japanese version and has several additional features.

According to the manufacturer, the i-MiEV all-electric range is 160 kilometres (100 mi) on the Japanese test cycle. The range for the 2012 model year American version is 62 miles (100 km) on the United States Environmental Protection Agency's (US EPA) cycle. In November 2011 the Mitsubishi i ranked first in EPA's 2012 Annual Fuel Economy Guide, and became the most fuel efficient EPA certified vehicle in the U.S. for all fuels ever, until it was surpassed by the Honda Fit EV in June 2012 and the BMW i3, Chevrolet Spark EV, Volkswagen e-Golf, and Fiat 500e in succeeding years.

As of July 2014, Japan ranked as the leading market with over 10,000 i-MiEVs sold, followed by Norway with more than 4,900 units, France with over 4,700 units, Germany with more than 2,400 units, all three European countries accounting for the three variants of the i-MiEV family sold in Europe; and the United States with over 1,800 i-MiEVs sold through August 2014. As of early March 2015, and accounting for all variants of the i-MiEV, including the two minicab MiEV versions sold in Japan, global sales totaled over 50,000 units since 2009.

== History ==
Mitsubishi i-MiEV, based on the Mitsubishi i kei car, was first exhibited at the 22nd International Battery, Hybrid and Fuel Cell Electric Vehicle Symposium & Exposition in Yokohama. Mitsubishi eschews the in-wheel motors (MIEV) in favour of a more conventional array of batteries, motor and inverter to replace the "rear midship" engine and fuel tank of the conventional car. Mitsubishi Motors provided three power companies with vehicles in 2006 and 2007 in order to conduct joint research to evaluate how fast-charge infrastructure may be developed for EVs. Fleet testing by five power companies was conducted in 2007. The car had a range of 130 kilometres (80 mi) for the 16 kW⋅h lithium-ion battery pack and 160 kilometres (100 mi) for the 20 kW⋅h pack. Top speed was 130 kilometres per hour (80 mph).

Plans were announced in 2008 to sell the i-MiEV in European markets as the Peugeot iOn and Citroën C-Zero. Mitsubishi began supplying the electric cars to PSA Peugeot Citroën (PSA) since 2010, and PSA has a contractual commitment to buy 100,000 i-MiEVs over a period that remained confidential.

== Specifications ==
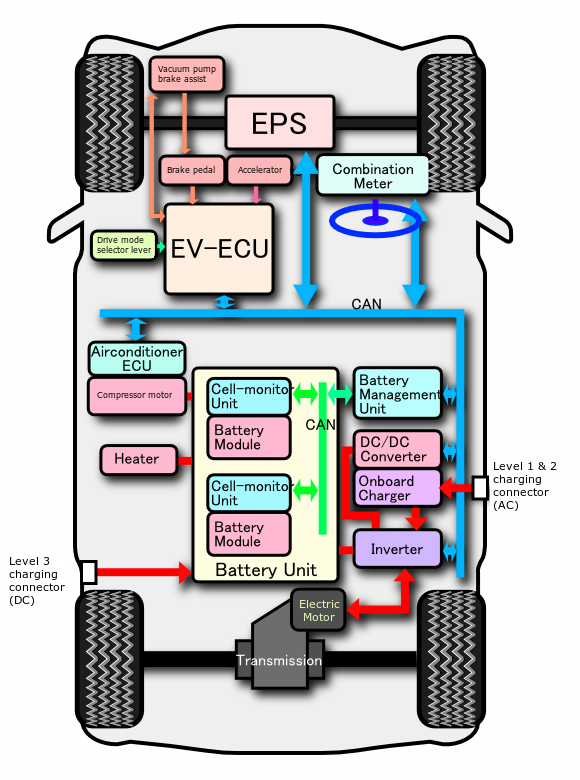
Mitsubishi i-MiEV's System Diagram

=== Powertrain ===
The production version of the 2009 i-MiEV has a single permanent magnet synchronous motor mounted on the rear axle with a rated peak power output of 49 kW (66 hp) (between 2500 and 8000 RPM) and torque output of 180 N⋅m (130 lbf⋅ft) (between 0 and 2000 RPM). The continuous power rating is 35 kW (47 hp). The North American model had a rated stall torque output of 197 N⋅m (145 lb⋅ft) (between 0 and 300 RPM).

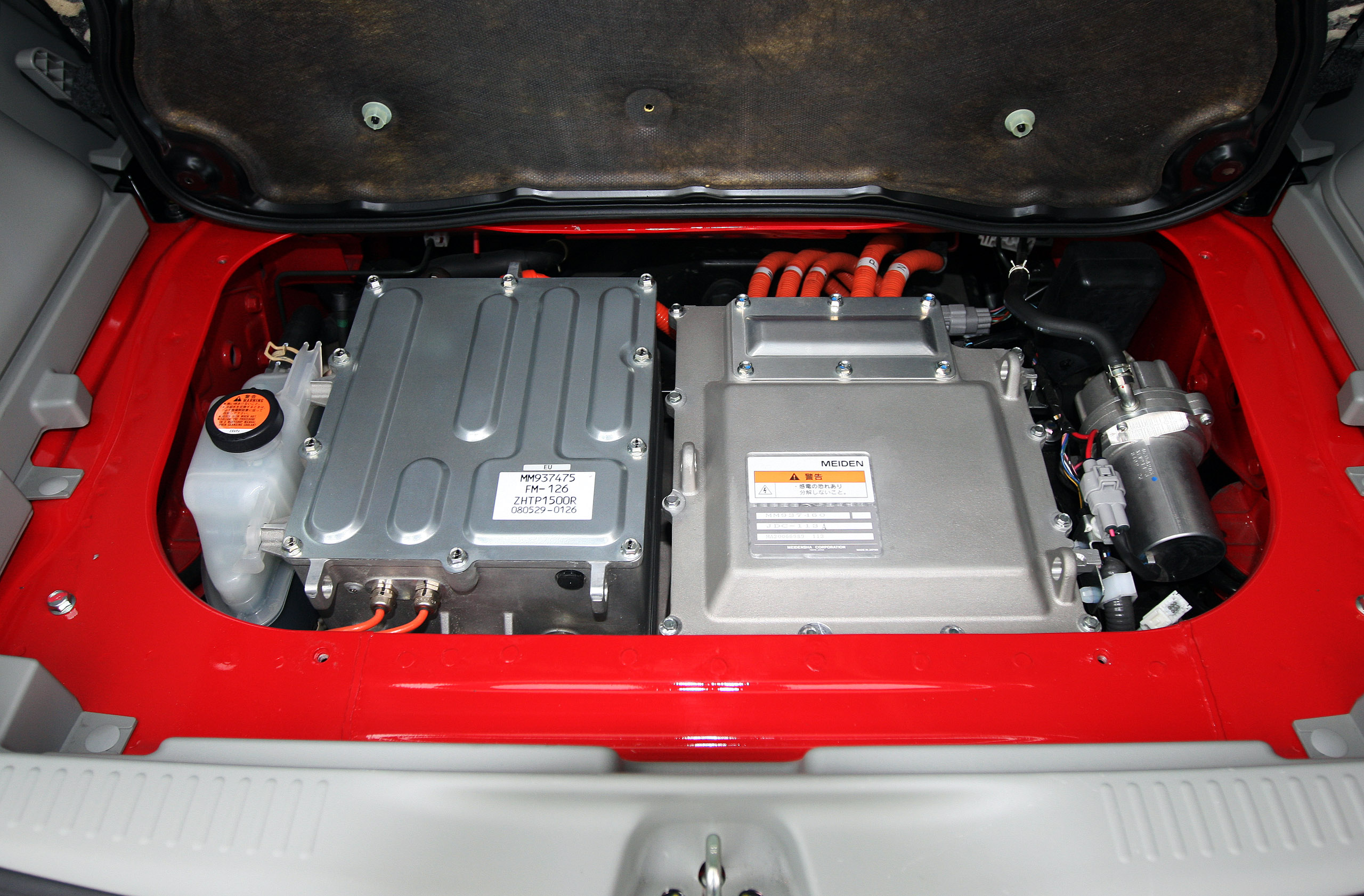
Mitsubishi i MiEV. Under the rear load platform. The inverter, rectifier and DC-DC voltage reduction device (For auxiliary battery). The motor, differential and reduction gear assembly are beneath. On the left, the red filler cap is for motor coolant (water antifreeze mix). On the right, the electric vacuum pump for the braking system.

The motor is water cooled, there is a conventional automobile radiator in the front of the car with an electric fan. The coolant (with antifreeze) level is monitored via a tank under the rear load platform on the left hand side of the vehicle.

The vehicle uses a single-speed reduction gear transmission driving the rear wheels and has a 16 kWh lithium-ion battery pack. The car's top speed is 130 kilometres per hour (80 mph).

Under its five-cycle testing, the US EPA rated the American 2012 model year Mitsubishi i with a combined fuel economy equivalent of 112 MPGe (2.1 L/100 km), with an equivalent 126 mpg_{‑US} (1.87 L/100 km; 151 mpg_{‑imp}) in city driving and 99 mpg_{‑US} (2.4 L/100 km; 119 mpg_{‑imp}) on highways. This rating allowed the 2012 Mitsubishi i to get a higher MPG-e rating than the 2011 Nissan Leaf, which was rated at 99 MPGe (2.4 L/100 km) combined, but the Leaf rated a better range due to the Mitsubishi i's smaller battery pack. Consumption was rated at 97 Wh/km (560 kJ/mi) under the NEDC, with a maximum range of 93 mi (150 km) under that cycle.

=== Battery ===
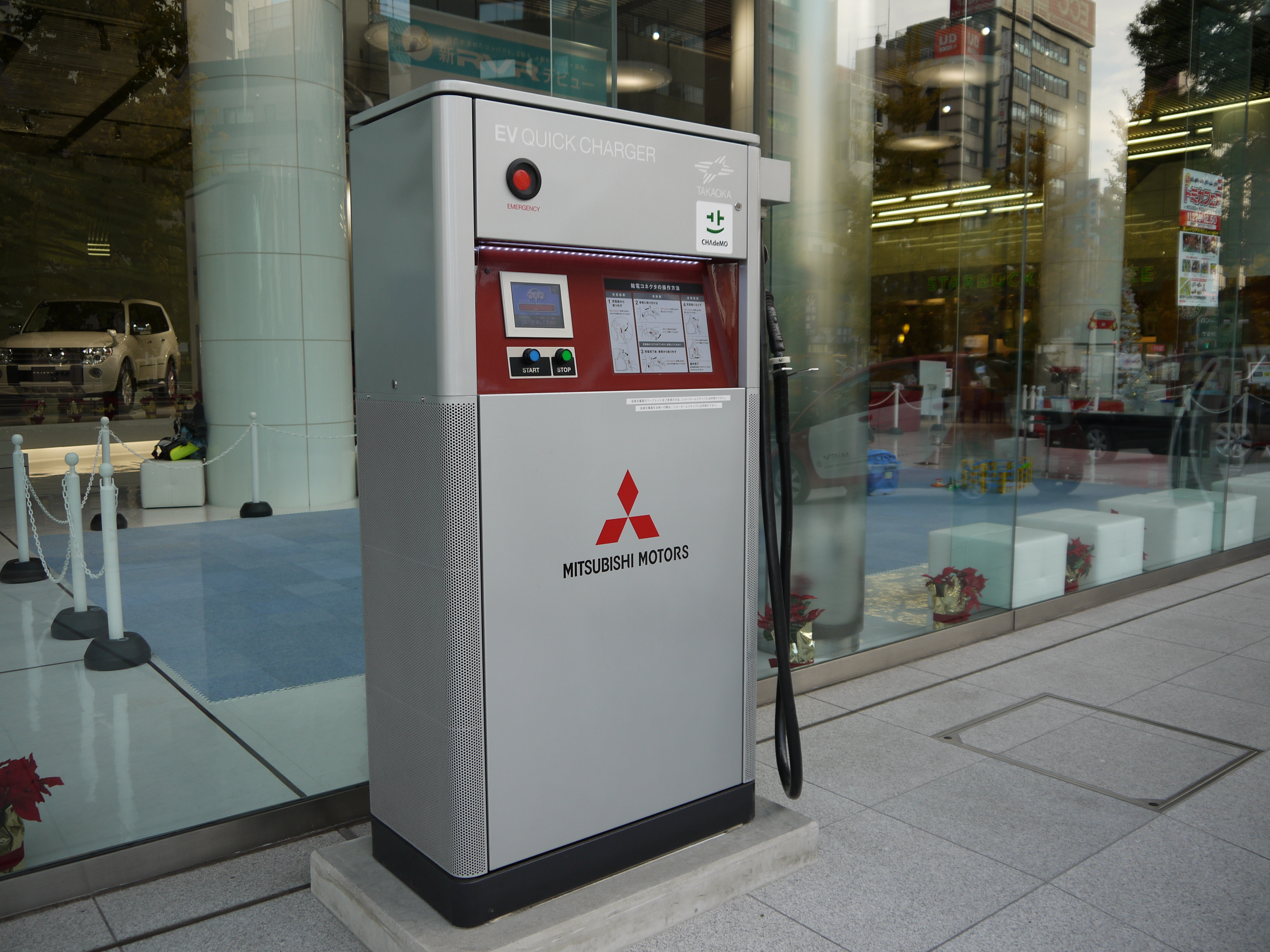
EV Quick Charger (200V)

The 16-kilowatt-hour (58 MJ) lithium-ion battery pack consists of 88 cells placed under the base floor. The pack has 12 cell modules connected in series at a nominal voltage of 330 V. There are two 4-cell modules placed vertically at the center of the pack and ten 8-cell modules placed horizontally. The cells are designated LEV50, developed by Mitsubishi and GS Yuasa for both high specific energy and high rate discharge and manufactured by Lithium Energy Japan, a joint venture of GS Yuasa Corporation, Mitsubishi Corporation and Mitsubishi Motors Corporation.

The entire pack has a specific energy of 80 Wh/kg. Each cell has a nominal voltage of 3.7 V and capacity of 50 A-hr (185 W-hr), measuring (H×W×L) 113.5 mm × 43.8 mm × 171 mm (4.47 in × 1.72 in × 6.73 in) and weighing 1.7 kg (3.7 lb). A four-cell module connected in series with 14.8 V and the same 50 A-hr (740 W-hr) capacity, designated LEV50-4, measures (H×W×L) 116 mm × 194 mm × 175 mm (4.6 in × 7.6 in × 6.9 in) and weighs 7.5 kg (17 lb). The battery has a forced air cooling system to prevent overheating during high charge and discharge rates and consequent damage; an optional heater is available for charging during cold weather. There is an integral fan in the battery pack. For rapid charging, the battery pack is additionally cooled with refrigerated air from the car's air conditioning system.

==== N-variant cells ====
From the 2013 model year onwards, the cells used in the battery were switched from the LEV50 to the LEV50N. At this time, the Peugeot iOn and Citroën C-Zero batteries were reduced to 80 cells, while the i-MiEV continued with 88 cells; because the individual LEV50N cells each had the same capacity as the LEV50 cells, the overall battery pack was reduced to 14.5 kW-hr for the iOn and C-Zero, but improvements in the regenerative braking efficiency meant the range was unchanged. The "N" variant featured improved life under high discharge current and ambient temperatures due to an electrolyte additive which reduced internal resistance.

==== SCiB-variant cells ====
In June 2011 Mitsubishi announced it would adopt Toshiba's Super Charge Ion Battery (SCiB) technology for its two new models of electric vehicles, the i-MiEV and Minicab MiEV. The SCiB technology uses lithium titanate oxide chemistry; Toshiba stated that its SCiB batteries can withstand 2.5 times more charge/discharge cycles than a typical lithium-ion battery. In addition, recharging via CHAdeMO takes much less time than charging at the AC Level 2 rate used by most electric vehicle supply equipment (EVSE), allowing the SCiB battery to reach 80% capacity in 15 minutes, 50% in 10 minutes and 25% in 5 minutes. Total capacity with the SCiB technology was 10.5 kW-hr.

The SCiB battery offers a higher effective capacity than a typical lithium-ion battery, which combined with more efficient regenerative charging during braking or coasting downhill, allows the SCiB battery to deliver 1.7 times the driving range per charge of a typical lithium-ion battery of the same size. Alternatively, the carmaker could install a smaller battery with less weight and keep the same range to contribute to lower the vehicle price as compared to lithium-ion batteries. Recharging is estimated to take 14 hours from a 110-volt power supply, 7 hours from a 220-volt power supply and as little as 30 minutes from a quick charging station.

The SCiB battery was only available in the Japanese model. Other markets retained the LEV50 or LEV50N lithium ion cells.

=== Charging (types and modes) ===
i-MiEV inlets

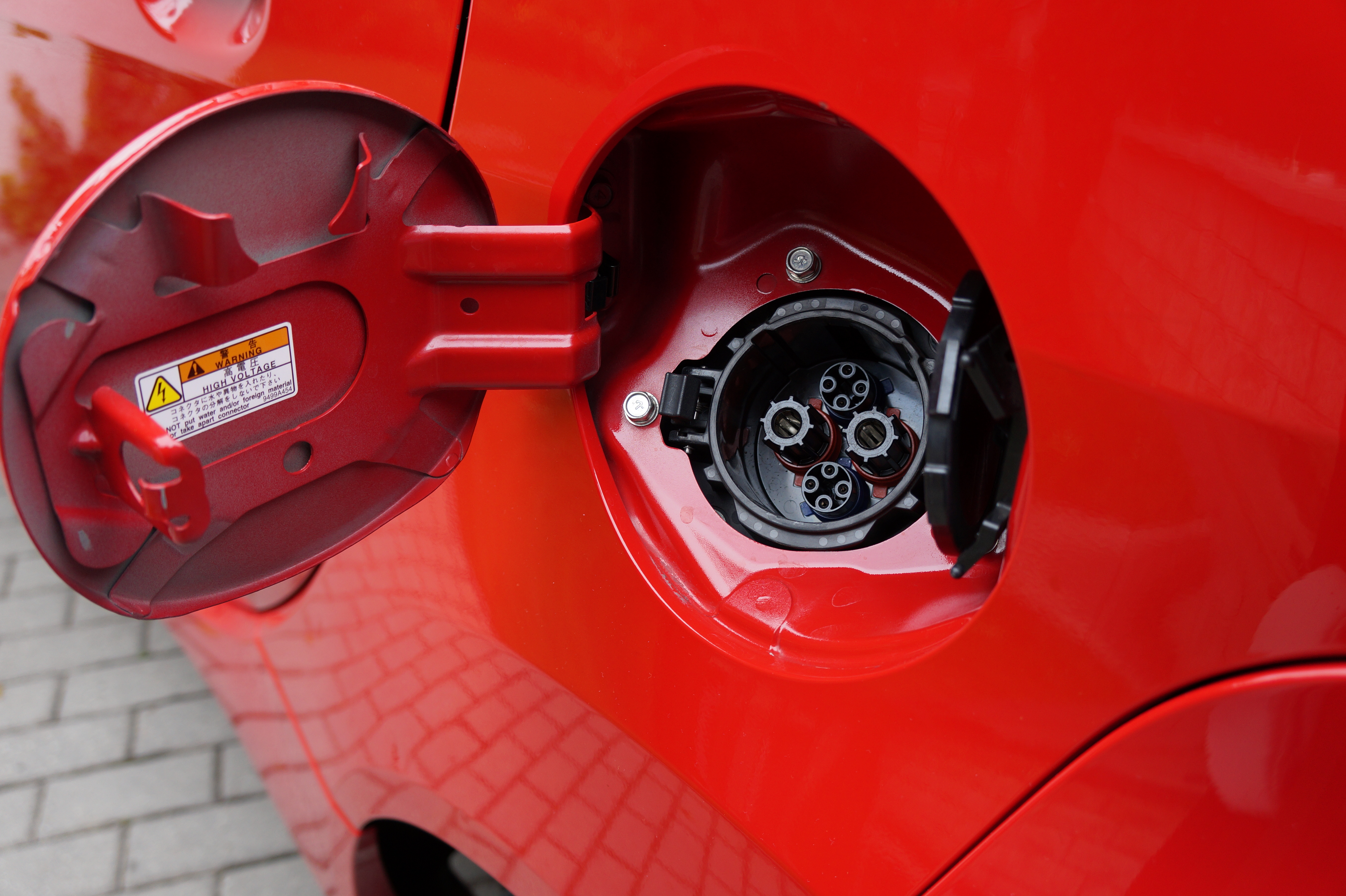
CHAdeMO (DC fast charge)

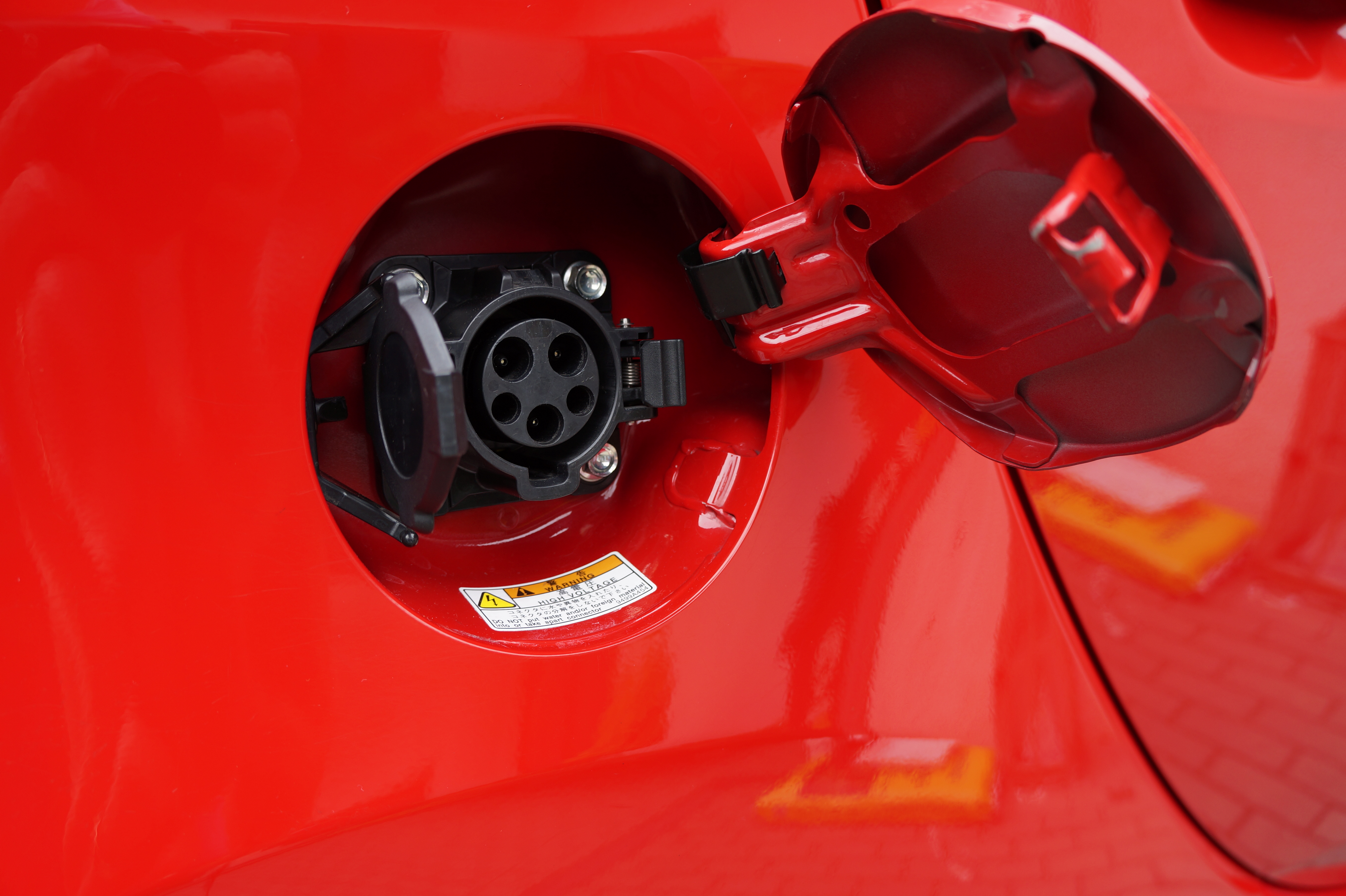
Yazaki/Type 1 (AC)

It includes two types of charging inlet connectors:

- CHAdeMO: On the left hand side of the car, towards the rear, is the “rapid” DC charging point. It is beneath a cover (released from inside the car), there is a dust cover beneath to keep out insects etc. There are two large pins (for the charging current) and eight small ones for control circuitry. The cable used for this purpose is captive to the roadside charging point. When the car is on fast (DC) charge, the air conditioning system is automatically started and refrigerated air is blown through the battery pack for cooling purposes. There is a diverter flap in the ventilation system for this. From depletion, the battery may be charged to 80% full in 30 minutes using this socket.
- Yazaki: On the right hand side of the car is the “fast” and “slow” AC charging point, accessed in a similar way to the DC charge point. This is a five pin IEC62196 Type 1 point. Three large pins are the line, neutral and earth/ground. The two small pins are a control circuit. This circuit enables the charge current to be cut off when charging is complete, cuts off power if the plug is removed from the vehicle (the plug and socket are both unshuttered), prevents both rapid and fast charging being done simultaneously and also prevents the vehicle from being driven while the plug is inserted. For “fast charging”, the control box (mounted at the roadside) is limited to 16 amps enabling a charge time (from depletion) of five hours. For “slow charging”, a non-captive lead/cord is provided with the car. It is intended for use in the home or other domestic places. This has a local plug at one end and a Yazaki connector at the other. There is an in-line control box in the middle of this lead/cord that functions similarly to the fast charger but limits current to 10 Amps, enabling an eight-hour charge time (from complete depletion on 230 volts).

=== Emergency power supply and V2G ===
In the aftermath of the 2011 Tōhoku earthquake and tsunami, Mitsubishi introduced one year ahead of schedule a device called MiEV Power Box that enables the i-MiEV to supply power to home electric appliances in the event of a power outage or natural disasters. The device provides 100-volt outlets, converting the i-MiEV's direct current (DC) battery power into 100 volts alternating current (AC) to power up to 1,500 watts of small electrical equipment. Mitsubishi estimates that the i-MiEV total battery capacity is enough to provide power for between 5 and 6 hours, equivalent to one day of power consumed by an average Japanese home. The device was scheduled to be available by the end of April 2012, at a cost of ¥149,800 (US$1,800) but as of November 2013 it is not clear if this is widely available.

On the other hand, Mitsubishi HEMS (Home Energy Management System), is the V2G system.

=== Regenerative braking control ===
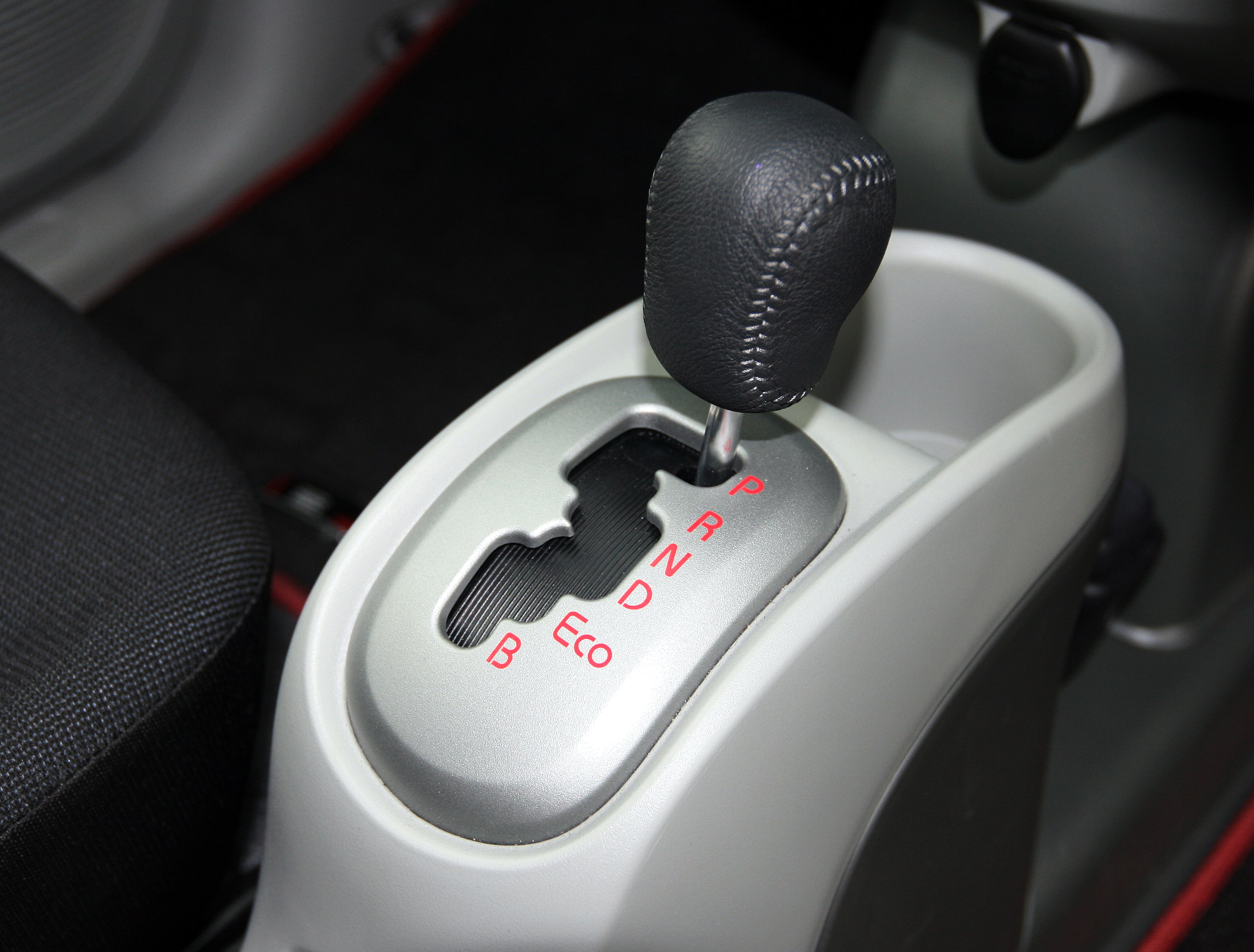
Driving mode selector

The manufacturers have made every effort to make the very different technology of this car appear similar to conventional cars. The lever between the front seats appears to be an automatic transmission control but is not so, though it works in a similar fashion. It is in fact a switch which reverses the electric motor and also controls the strength of the regenerative braking through a driving mode selector. Correct use of the regeneration control can influence the range of the car.

As well as "park" "neutral" and "reverse" there are three driving mode positions that affect the strength of regeneration, intended for city driving (D), hilly terrain (B), and flat terrain (C) respectively; the North American model is labeled (E)co instead of (C). Used correctly, on most journeys, a large percentage of kinetic energy and potential energy can be returned to the battery. Lifting off the accelerator/"gas" pedal also induces regeneration as does light pressure on the foot brake. The only other mechanical losses are frictional. The main loss is aerodynamic drag which is proportional to the square of speed, hence high speeds are inefficient and reduce range.

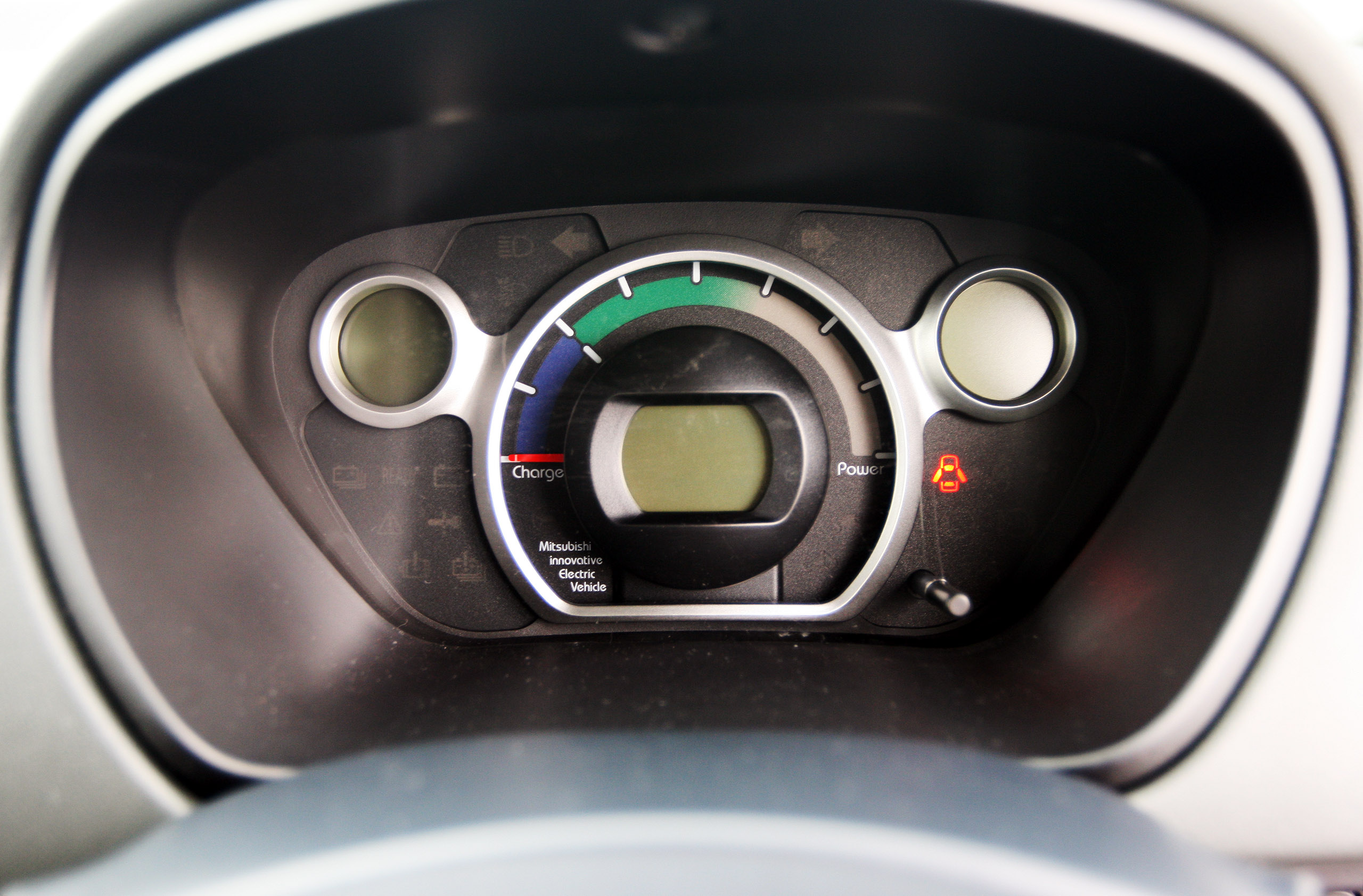
Dashboard; digital speedometer is in the center, surrounded by a prominent analog power consumption/ regeneration gauge. The neutral position is indicated by two short white lines dividing the blue (regeneration) and green (discharge) zones.

Regeneration and power consumption can be monitored by the driver with an analogue instrument surrounding the digital speedometer on the dashboard/control panel which shows both instantaneous power consumed (needle moving to the right of its resting neutral position) and regeneration (needle moving to the left).

=== Electrical equipment ===
The heating of the passenger cab is by a conventional "wet" automotive system. Heat is derived from the traction battery via a resistance element. Use of the heater significantly reduces range. The traction motor cooling system runs at much lower temperatures than in a conventional car and is therefore separate from the cab heating system. While the car is charging, the interior can be preheated to alleviate the range reduction problem.

There is an auxiliary, 12-volt conventional lead-acid battery under the bonnet/hood for the accessories. It is also needed to control and charge the main traction battery and to start the vehicle. It is charged from the main traction battery via a DC-DC voltage reduction device. If it is discharged, the vehicle cannot be started, neither can the main traction battery be charged. Use of 12-volt "jump cables" from another vehicles is possible.

The steering is rack and pinion with electric power assistance. An emergency cutoff for main battery is located under the front left hand seat. If the car is involved in a collision, there is a cutoff switch that is operated by the G forces involved.

=== Wheels ===
The front and rear wheels are different sizes. Instead of a spare wheel, a roadside repair kit with a 12-volt electric compressor (plugs into cigarette lighter) and a bottle of repair fluid is located under the cushion of the rear passenger seat.

=== Braking system ===
The braking system is conventional hydraulic (power-assisted) with disk brakes at the front and drum brakes at the rear. An Anti-lock Braking System and Traction Control System are fitted. The hand/parking brake is cable operated, acting on the rear wheels. The hydraulic fluid reservoir is under the front bonnet/hood. As there is no manifold vacuum, there is an electric vacuum pump located under the rear loading platform.

On some models, there are interlocks on the braking system so that the startup process can only be initiated when the brake pedal is pressed.

=== Range ===
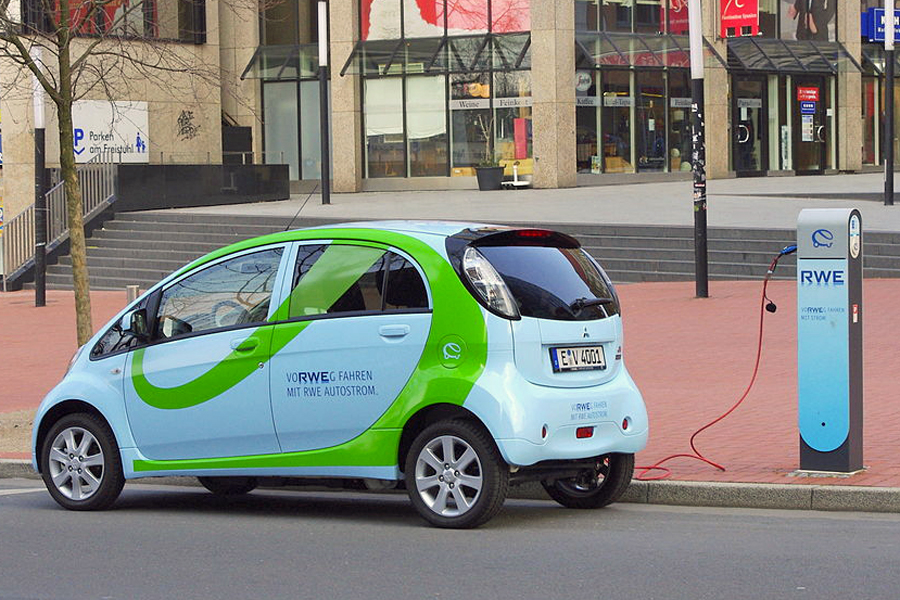
Mitsubishi i-MiEV charging

The all-electric range is 100 miles (160 km) on the Japanese test cycle. Two additional trim levels will be available in Japan beginning in late July 2011, the entry-level “M” with a 10.5 kWh battery pack has a reduced range of 120 kilometres (75 mi), and the higher-level "G" with the same a 16.0 kWh battery as the original i-MiEV has a range of 180 kilometres (110 mi). The "G" trim availability was announced as mid August 2011.

The US EPA official range for the 2012 model year American "i" version is 62 miles (100 km) based on the five-cycle tests using varying driving conditions and climate controls. Under the LA4 driving cycle for city conditions, EPA's rated range is 98 miles (158 km). According to the carmaker, the city range of the 2012 Mitsubishi i was improved as compared to the previous i-MiEV versions, through software upgrades and a revamped regenerative braking system.

The Australian Government's Green Vehicle Guide estimated the i-MiEV's range to be 155 kilometres (96 mi).

In practice range is affected by driving style, hilliness of the terrain, speed and use of passenger compartment heating and cooling. Strong head and following winds also make a noticeable difference.

=== Towing ===
The drive system is permanently connected to the rear wheels. This means that the vehicle must be transported/towed with the rear (driving) wheels off the ground to prevent damage. Using the car to tow trailers is not recommended.

=== Safety ===
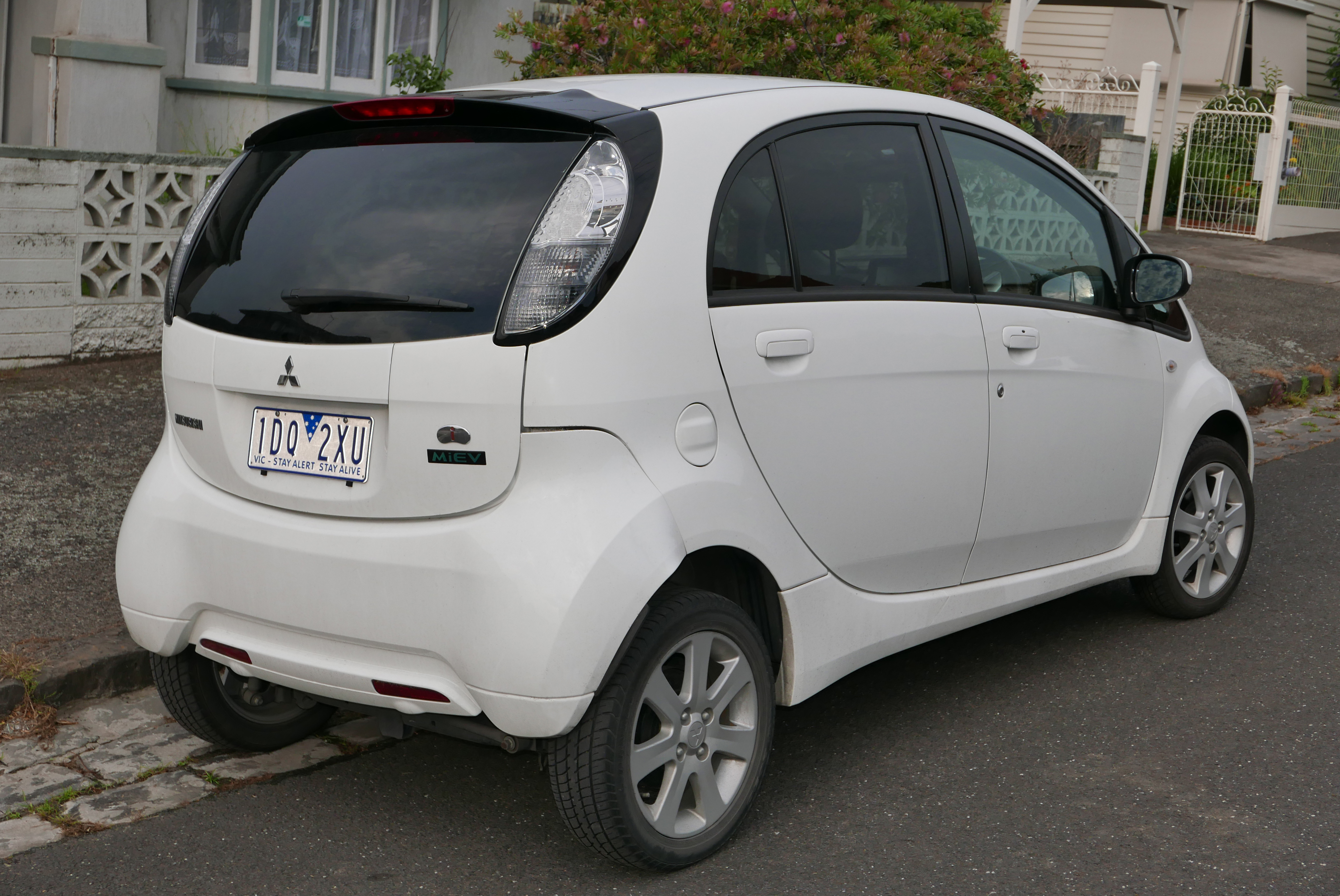
Mitsubishi i-MiEV hatchback (Australia)

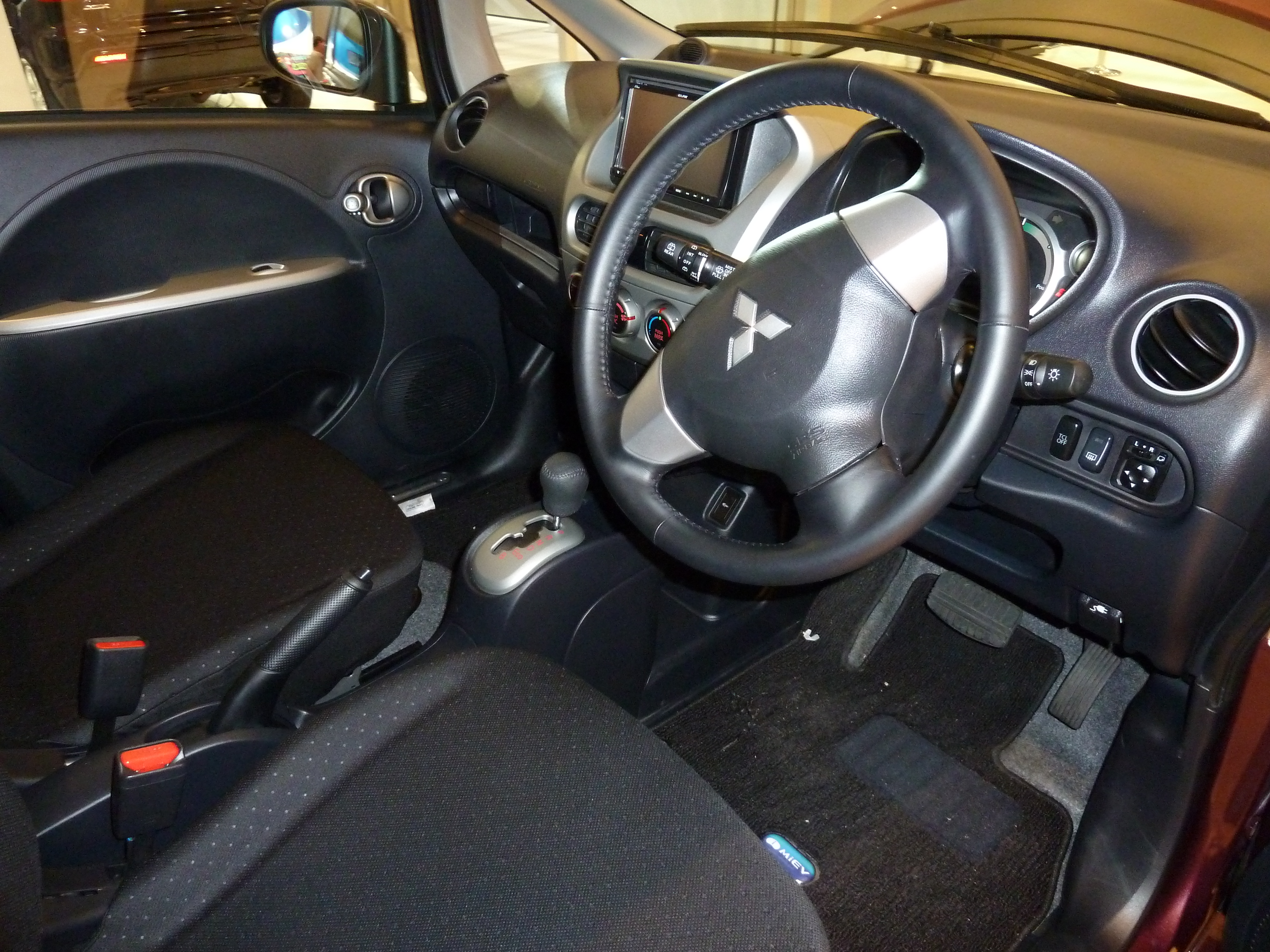
Interior

The European New Car Assessment Programme (Euro NCAP) awarded the i-MiEV a four-star car safety rating, earning the following ratings for each criterion. The tested model was a left-hand-drive five-door hatchback registered in 2011:

Euro NCAP test results* Mitsubishi i-MiEV (2011)
| Test | Points | % |
|---|---|---|
| Overall: | 4 /5 stars | |
| Adult occupant: | 26 | 73% |
| Child occupant: | 38 | 78% |
| Pedestrian: | 17 | 48% |
| Safety assist: | 6 | 86% |

Euro NCAP also states that it "believes that the star rating of the i-MiEV can also be applied to the Citroën C-Zero" because the agency was informed that the Citroën C-Zero is structurally identical to the Mitsubishi i-MiEV and has the same interior fitting and levels of safety equipment.

The Australasian New Car Assessment Program (ANCAP) rated the i-MiEV four out of five stars for crash safety, scoring 28.35 out of 37. This score takes into account a 10.95 out of 16 rating in the frontal offset crash test, and a score of 14.4 out of 16 received for the side impact test.

ANCAP test results* Mitsubishi i-MiEV 5 door hatches (2011)
| Test | Score |
|---|---|
| Overall | 4 /5 stars |
| Frontal offset | 10.95/16 |
| Side impact | 14.40/16 |
| Pole | Not Assessed |
| Seat belt reminders | 3/3 |
| Whiplash protection | Good |
| Pedestrian protection | Marginal |
| Electronic stability control | Standard |

The U.S. National Highway Traffic Safety Administration (NHTSA) gave the 2012 model year i-Miev a four out of five-star crash rating.

== Production ==
Full production of the i-MiEV started in July 2009 and Mitsubishi expected initial sales volume to be small, to sell up to 1,400 vehicles by March 2010, but expected sales to rise to 5,000 vehicles in the following twelve months, once retail sales had started. Mitsubishi decided to target sales to corporate customers in Japan at first to allow local governments and businesses to set up recharging stations around the country. The company said initial sales were constrained by production capacity but expects production to ramp up quickly from 2,000 units in 2009/10 to 30,000 vehicles within three years as it expands production of lithium-ion battery through Lithium Energy Japan, a joint venture with GS Yuasa Corporation and Mitsubishi Corporation. Production was projected to increase to 9,000 units in its fiscal year 2010/11, and to 18,000 in the following twelve months.

Production of the left-hand drive European-spec i-MiEV began in October 2010. By the end of November 2010 cumulative production had reached 5,000 units at Mitsubitshi's Mizushima Plant. In May 2011 Mitsubishi announced a new production target of 25,000 i-MiEVs worldwide in fiscal year 2011. The carmaker also plans to export about 15,000 units overseas, mainly to Europe, where the company will promote sales to the European public sector, such as police departments and local governments. Production of the American-spec Mitsubishi i electric car began in late October 2011. Since July 2009 Mitsubishi had manufactured more than 33,000 i-MiEVs and rebadge versions by March 2013, including more than 11,000 units rebadged in France as Peugeot iOn and Citroën C-Zero, and sold in the European market.

In August 2012, and as a result of Europe's debt crisis that resulted in PSA Peugeot Citroën (PSA) Group slow sales, Mitsubishi Motors announced the suspension of its supply of the i-MiEV electric vehicle to PSA, although the period for supplying vehicles under their contract as part of original equipment manufacturer agreements has not yet ended. The suspension is part of the decision of several Japanese manufacturers to suspend their joint development projects and contracts with several European partners. By early August 2012, PSA had sold a total of 6,575 Peugeot iOns and Citroën C-Zeros since their launch in Europe in 2010, while Mitsubishi had assembled almost 11,000 electric cars destined to PSA, leaving the French carmaker with more than 4,400 electric cars in unsold inventory. PSA only sold 50% of the sales target set for 2011 and according to PSA the supply was only temporarily interrupted.

In May 2014, PSA Peugeot Citroën Chief Executive, Carlos Tavares, announced that the carmaker will decide over the next 12 months whether to continue selling electric vehicles manufactured by its partner Mitsubishi. Sales of both of PSA rebadged electric cars fell significantly from 2012 to 2013 as a result of new competition from Nissan, Renault and BMW.

Production ceased in March 2021.

| Year | Worldwide production | | | Notes |
| Year | C-ZERO | iOn | i-MiEV | Notes |
| 2009 | —N/a | —N/a | 1,710 | |
| 2010 | 425 | 425 | 7,646 | C-ZERO and iOn launched. |
| 2011 | 3,377 | 3,257 | 8,161 | 3,607 total Peugeot iOns produced. 3,724 total Citroën C-ZEROs produced. |
| 2012 | 1,800 | 1,800 | TBA | 5,400 total Peugeot iOns produced. 5,500 total Citroën C-ZEROs produced. |

== Markets and sales ==
The i-MiEV was launched for fleet customers in Japan in July 2009, becoming the world's first modern highway-capable mass production electric car. Sales to retail customers began in Japan in April 2010. The Mitsubishi i MiEV was the first electric car to sell more than 10,000 units, including the models badged in Europe as Citroën C-Zero and Peugeot iOn. The record, officially registered by Guinness World Records, was reached in February 2011. Several months later, the Nissan Leaf overtook the i MiEV as the best selling all-electric car.

By 2012, accounting for all vehicles of the iMiEV brand, Mitsubishi reported around 27,200 units sold or exported since 2009 through December 2012, including the minicab MiEVs sold in Japan, and the units rebadged and sold as Peugeot iOn and Citroën C-Zero in the European market. As of June 2016, about 37,600 i-MiEV family passenger cars have been sold worldwide since 2009, including the rebadged Peugeot iOn and Citroën C-Zero sold in Europe. As of July 2014, Japan was the top selling country market with 10,011 i-MiEVs sold. All three variants of the i-MiEV family have sold over 17,500 units in Europe as of July 2014 , with registrations led by Norway with 4,920 units registered, followed by France with 4,710 units, and Germany with 2,419 units. The fifth largest country market is the United States, with 1,831 i-MiEVs sold through August 2014. As of early March 2015, and accounting for all variants of the i-MiEV, including the two minicab versions sold in Japan, over 50,000 units have been sold worldwide since 2009.

=== Australia ===
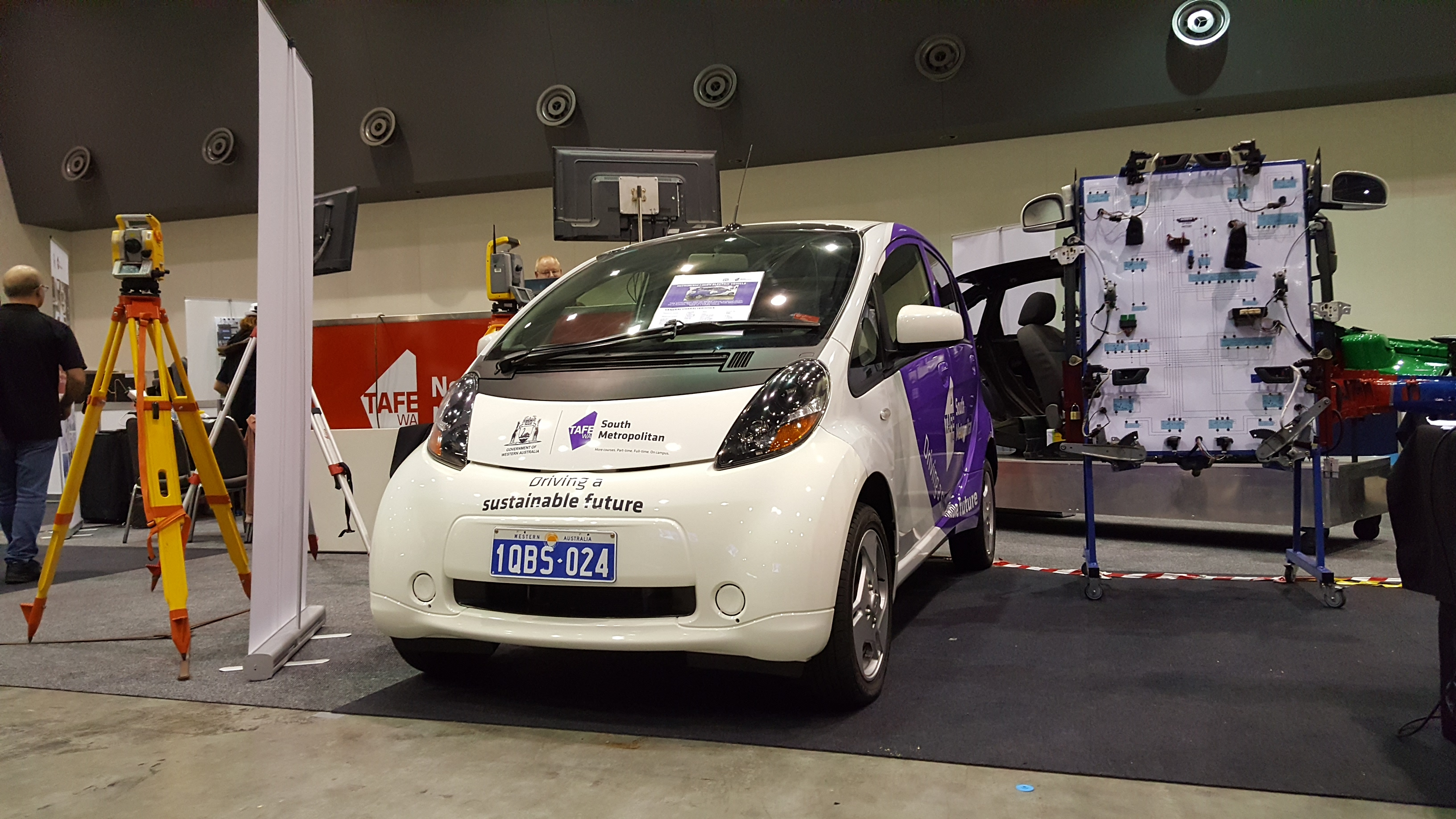
An i-MiEV on display at the Perth Convention & Exhibition Centre.

In March 2009 the i-MiEV was exhibited in Australia at the Melbourne International Motor Show, and afterwards was toured throughout the country. Beginning in mid 2009, Mitsubishi conducted a twelve-month field trial with potential electric vehicle customers, such as local, state and federal government bodies, and major fleet operators.

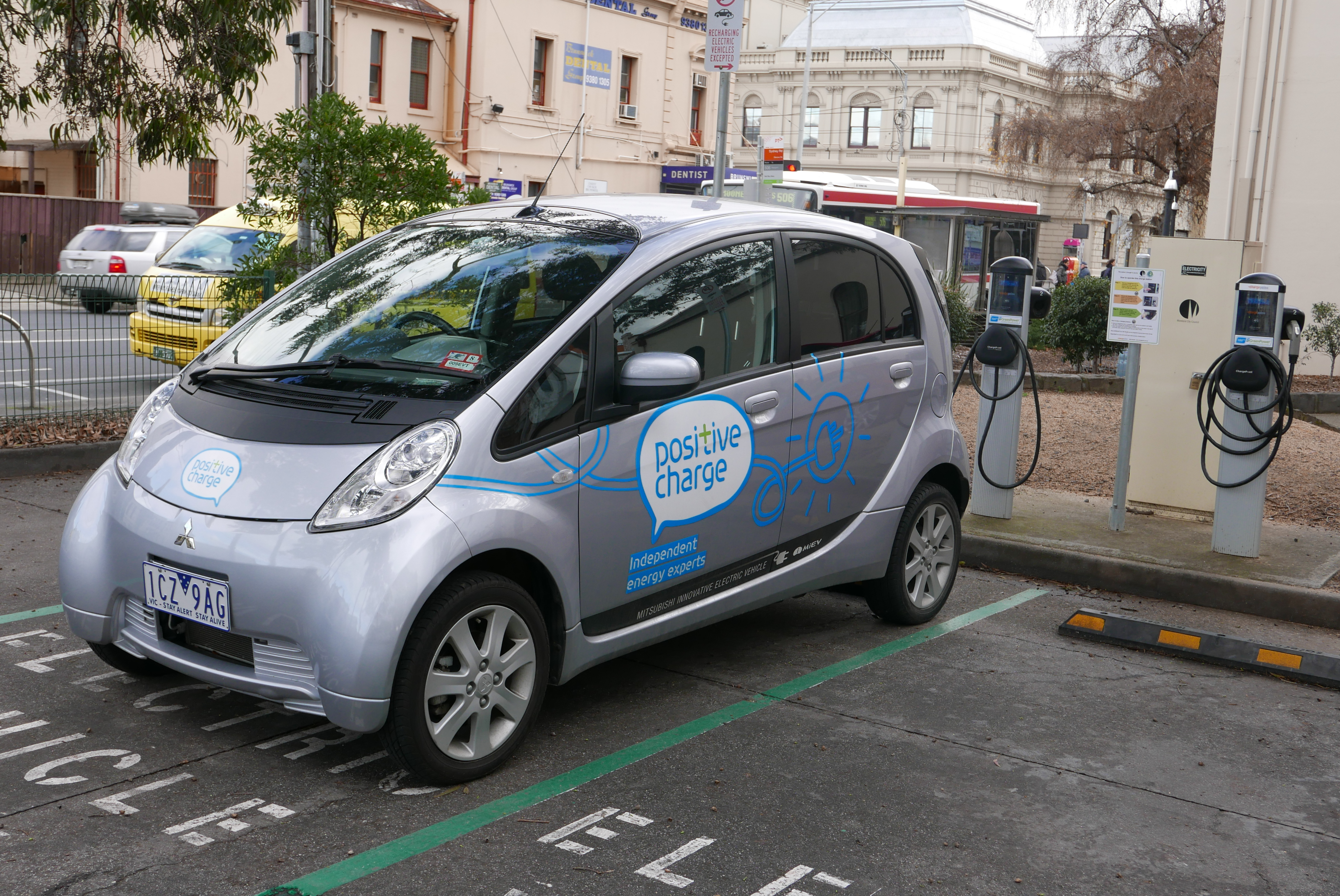
i-Miev, Positive Charge using the ChargePoint station

Sales for fleet customers began in Australia in August 2010 under leasing agreement at a price of A$1,740 a month for 36 months, for a cumulative total of A$62,640 after which the car has to be returned to the dealer. The initial shipment included only 40 units, but Mitsubishi Motors Australia reported that just before the launch it had received applications for more than 100 vehicles from private companies and government departments. The initial batch of vehicles leased to government and corporate fleets totals 112 vehicles.

Retail sales to the public began in August 2011. Currently, there are no government incentive or rebate schemes for purchasing fuel-efficient vehicles in the country. The new Australian i-MiEV version is similar to the European-spec model released in 2011, with minor changes such as new three-spoke alloy wheels, a few minor exterior tweaks including dark tinted headlights and a revised front bumper with fog lights. With an Australian Design Rules approved range of 155 km (96 mi), the Australian-spec i-MiEV is sold for A$48,800 (US$51,444 as of July 2011) through specially equipped Mitsubishi dealerships (one in each capital city and two in Sydney). Mitsubishi anticipates 5 sales to the public per month. Since then a large number of dealerships across Australia have purchased scoops of these vehicles and most dealerships (mainly in Victoria) have a single i-Miev in their showrooms at prices never seen in this market before. During 2011 a total of 30 i MiEVs were sold, and cumulative sales reached 252 units through December 2013. As of March 2014, Mitsubishi is no longer selling the i-MiEV due to slow sales.

=== Canada ===
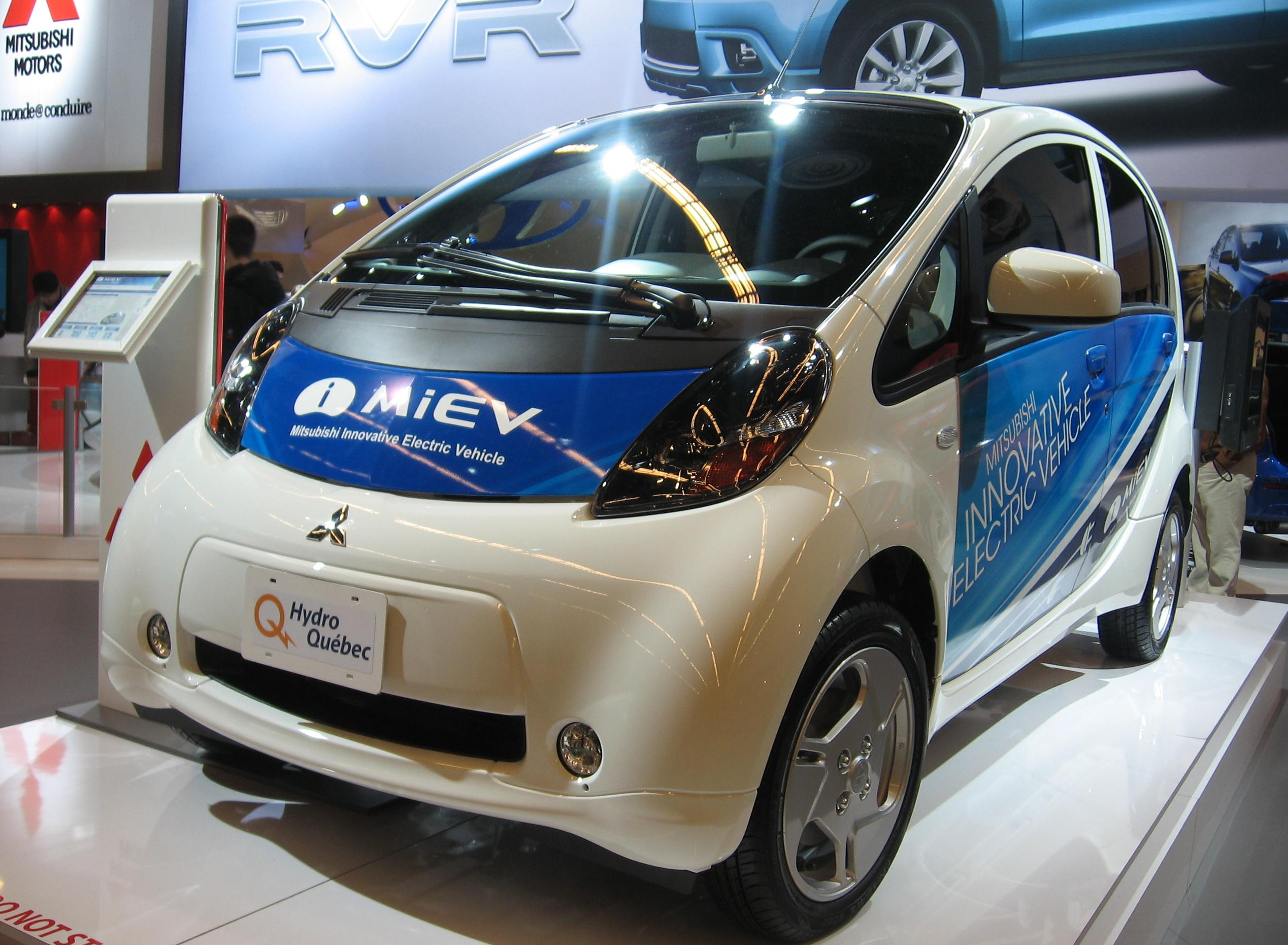
An i-MiEV from Hydro-Québec test program

In January 2009, Hydro-Québec and Mitsubishi signed an agreement to test 50 i-MiEVs, the largest pilot test of electric cars in Canada ever. The test's goal was to allow a better understanding of winter usage of the technology. BC-Hydro and Mitsubishi had previously tested a three-vehicle fleet in British Columbia. The first five i-MiEVs were delivered in December 2010 and were assigned to staff from the city of Boucherville. In October 2010, Transport Canada and Mitsubishi Motor Sales of Canada announced a partnership to test the Mitsubishi i-MiEV. Transport Canada's ecoTECHNOLOGY for Vehicles (eTV) Program tested two i-MiEVs in government facilities and in a variety of real-world conditions. This program aim was to evaluate the i-MiEV road performance and range.

Retail sales of the i-MiEV began in December 2011 at a starting price of CA$32,998 (US$33,891) before any government incentives available in Ontario and Quebec. Cumulative sales through December 2014 reached 496 units.

Mitsubishi sold the US i-MiEV version in Canada, although the international version was used in test fleets, and two trims were offered: standard and premium. The premium package price was CA$35,998 (US$36,972) and included leather-wrapped steering wheel and shift knob, 15-inch alloy wheels, premium audio system, HDD Navigation system, Bluetooth 2.0 hands-free cellular phone interface with streaming audio and USB input with voice control. For the 2018 model year, Mitsubishi made the decision to cease i-MiEV sales in Canada.

=== Europe ===
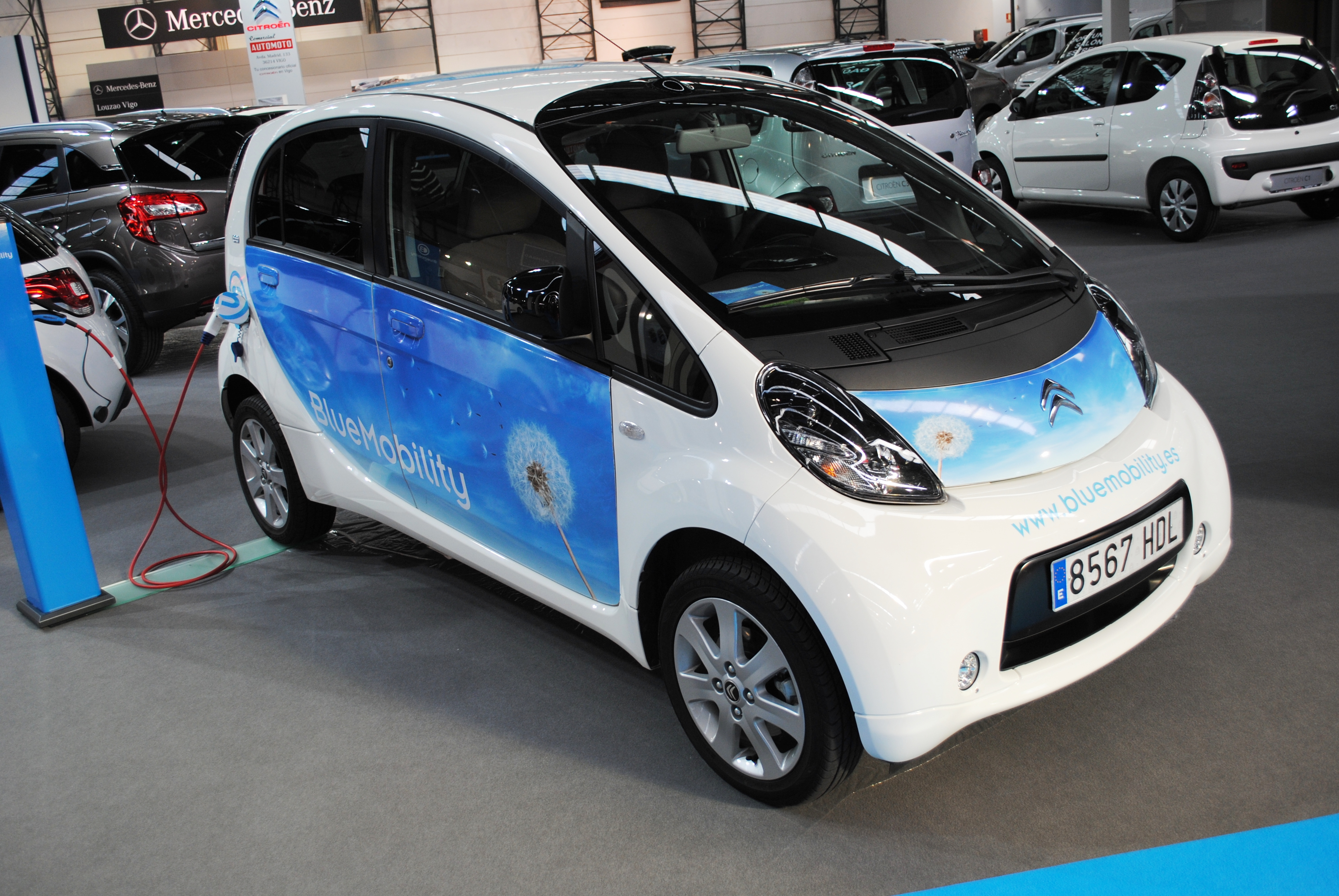
The Citroën C-Zero is a rebadged Mitsubishi i-MiEV.

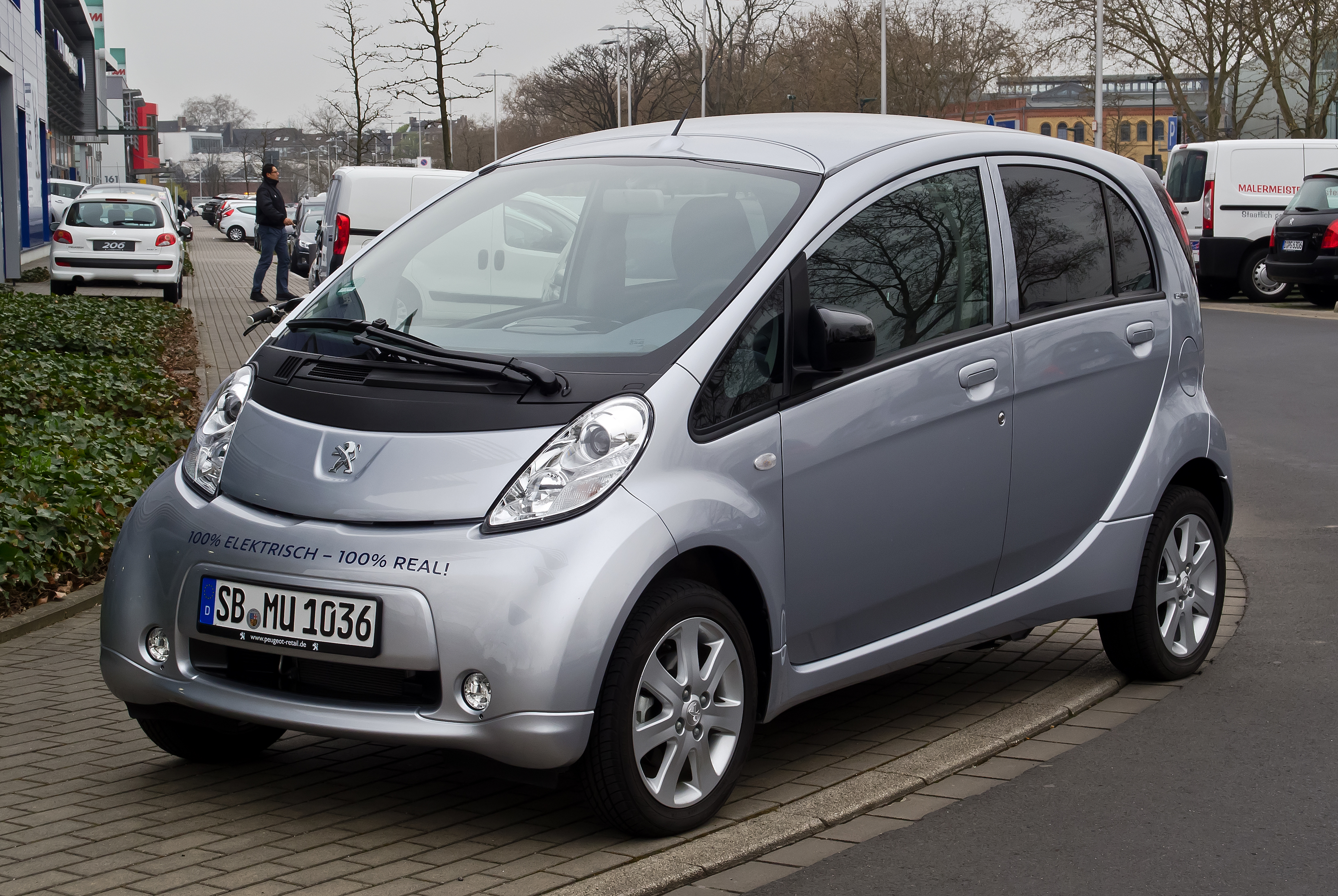
Peugeot iOn is another rebadged version of the i-MiEV

The European version of the i-MiEV was introduced at the 2010 Paris Motor Show. Specific features of the European version include a new design to the front and rear bumpers to meet EU regulations, re-arranged center stack in the instrument panel, improved interior comfort and both active and passive safety features have been improved with the addition of Active Stability Control (ASC), as well as side and curtain airbags, all included as standard equipment. The European MiEV achieves an all-electric range of 150 kilometres (93 mi) under the European NEDC driving pattern.

Mass production of the European i-MiEV began in October 2010 at Mitsubishi's Mizushima plant, along with production of its siblings by PSA Peugeot Citroën, the Peugeot iOn and the Citroën C-Zero. In January 2011, Mitsubishi shipped 2,500 i-MiEVs from Japan and began sales in 15 countries: Austria, Belgium, Denmark, France, Germany, Ireland, Italy, the Netherlands, Norway, Poland, Portugal, Spain, Sweden, Switzerland, and the United Kingdom, and further expand the European roll out through 2011. Mitsubishi also run demonstration programs with the i-MiEV in the Principality of Monaco, Iceland, and Denmark. The price of the European version varies by country but was set to around €33,000 to €35,000 (US$41,900 to US$44,400). The carmaker aimed for a final cost to the customer of under €30,000 (US$38,000) or equivalent after government incentives.

==== Austria ====
Retail deliveries began in 2011. A total of 704 units have been registered in Austria through December 2013, including 332 C-Zeros, 254 i MiEVs, and 118 iOns.

==== Denmark ====
Deliveries began in 2011. A total of 550 units have been registered in Denmark through December 2013, including 227 iOns, 202 C-Zeros, and 121 i MiEVs.

==== Estonia ====
On March 3, 2011, the government of Estonia confirmed the sale to Mitsubishi Corporation of 10 million carbon dioxide credits in exchange for 507 i-MiEV electric cars. The deal also includes funding to build 250 express charging stations in larger towns and main highways by 2013, and will subsidize the first 500 private buyers of any electric car approved by the European Union. The first 50 i-MiEVs were delivered in October 2011 and this official fleet will be assigned for use by municipal social workers. During the first round of allocations of the electric cars, municipalities requested only 336 of the 507 i-MiEVs available. Several local authorities have stated concerns about the i-MiEV's performance during harsh winter conditions, maintenance costs, and reliability on difficult countryside roads.

==== France ====
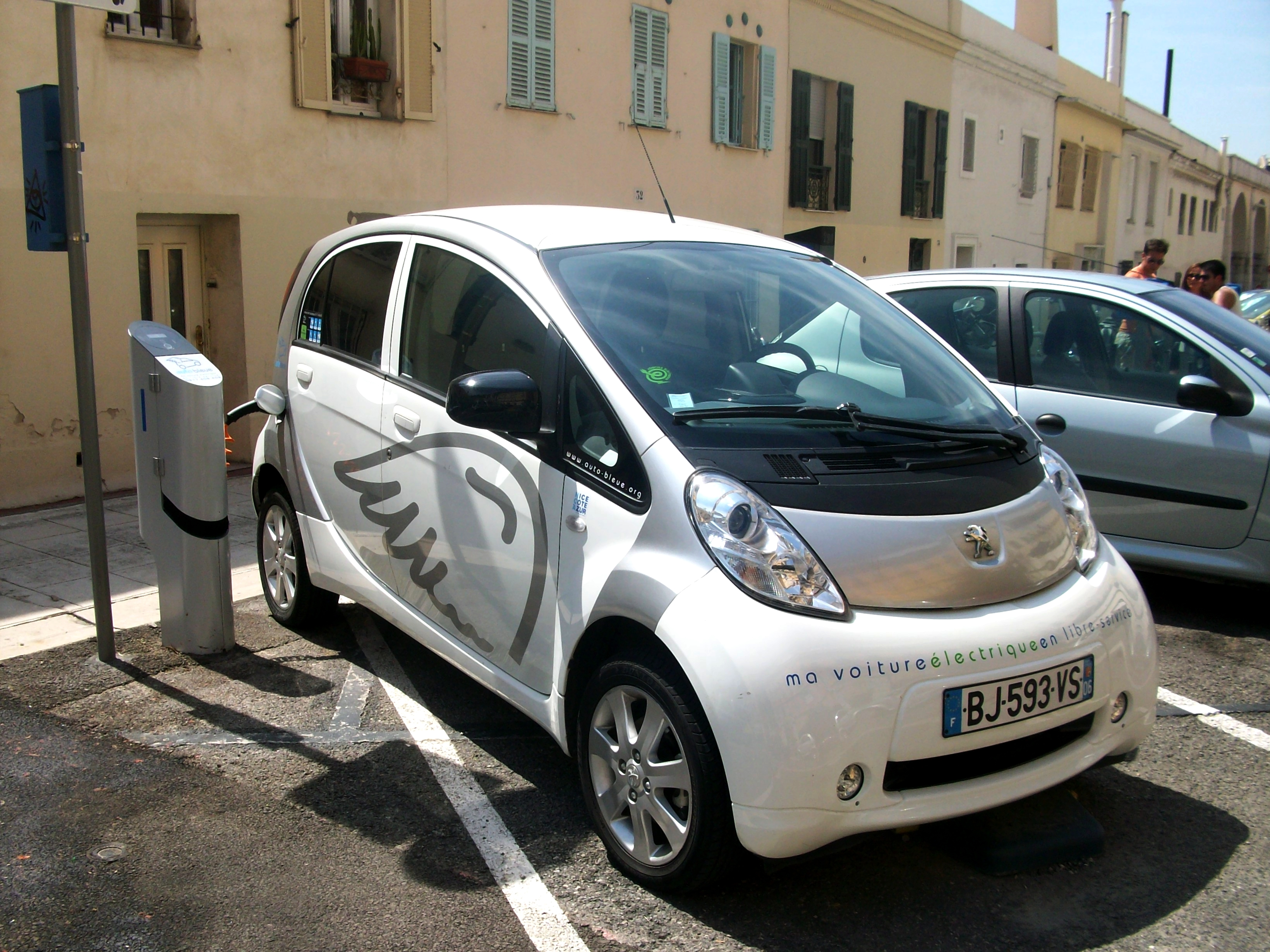
A Peugeot iOn charging in Nice, France.

The i-MiEV family sold 1,326 units in 2011, representing a market share of 50.4% of electric car sales in France. Sales were led by the Citroën C-Zero with 645 units followed by the Peugeot iOns with 639 vehicles, and the i-MiEVs with 42 units sold in 2011. In 2011 PSA Peugeot Citroën was awarded a contract to supply 3,900 electric cars to the French Government, to be used by government officials in Paris. Since its introduction in 2010, the i-MiEV family has sold 4,772 units through December 2014, including 2,419 iOns, 2,241 C-Zeros, and 112 i-MiEVs.

The C-Zero is available for rental starting at €35 (US$51) for half a day. The electric car is rented by the MultiCity vehicle rental service in selected French cities. The C-Zero is available in the Paris region at six locations: the Gare Montparnasse, Gare de Lyon and Gare du Nord train stations, Paris-Orly Airport, Porte Maillot and Nanterre.

==== Germany ====
The i-MiEV was launched in Germany in December 2010 at a price of €34,990 (~US$51,000). Germany does not have government purchase subsidies. The only incentive available is an exemption from the annual circulation tax for a period of five years from the date of first registration. On August 30, 2012, approximately 100 Citroën C-Zeros were deployed in Berlin as part of the Multicity Carsharing program. The number of cars is expected to grow to 500 by year end. Sales of the i-MiEV family represented 50.6% of all electric car sales in the country in 2011. Combined sales of the three variants peaked in 2011, with 1,146 units registered, and then fell to 788 units in 2012 and 413 in 2013. As of December 2014, a total of 2,494 units have been sold consisting of 976 i-MiEVs, 965 C-Zeros, and 553 iOns.

==== Italy ====
Retail deliveries began in February 2011. Cumulative sales totaled 540 units through December 2013 including 295 C-Zeros, 189 iOns and 56 i-MiEVs.

==== Netherlands ====
Sales started in 2011. In January 2019, the importer announced the i-MiEV would be discontinued. A total of 154 i-MiEVs were sold, as well as 228 C-Zeros and 325 Ions, making up a combined total of 707 units. Both the Peugeot as the Citroën will still be available.

==== Norway ====
After deliveries began in January 2011, the i-MiEV became the best selling electric car in Norway for a time, and the 1000th i-MiEV was delivered in November 2011. A total of 2,240 electric cars were sold in Norway during 2011, of which, 1,050 were i-MiEVS, 210 were Citroën C-Zeros, and 217 Peugeot iOns, for combined sales of 1,477 units representing together a 66% share of all electric cars sold during the year. Registrations climbed to 1,670 units in 2012, then fell to 1,094 in 2013, and stabilized in 2014 with 1,093 units. Cumulative registrations through December 2014 reached 5,334 units, including 2,589 i-MiEVs, 1,352 C-Zeros, and 1,393 iOns. The Norwegian market is one of 4 where the iMiev remains on sale in 2020.

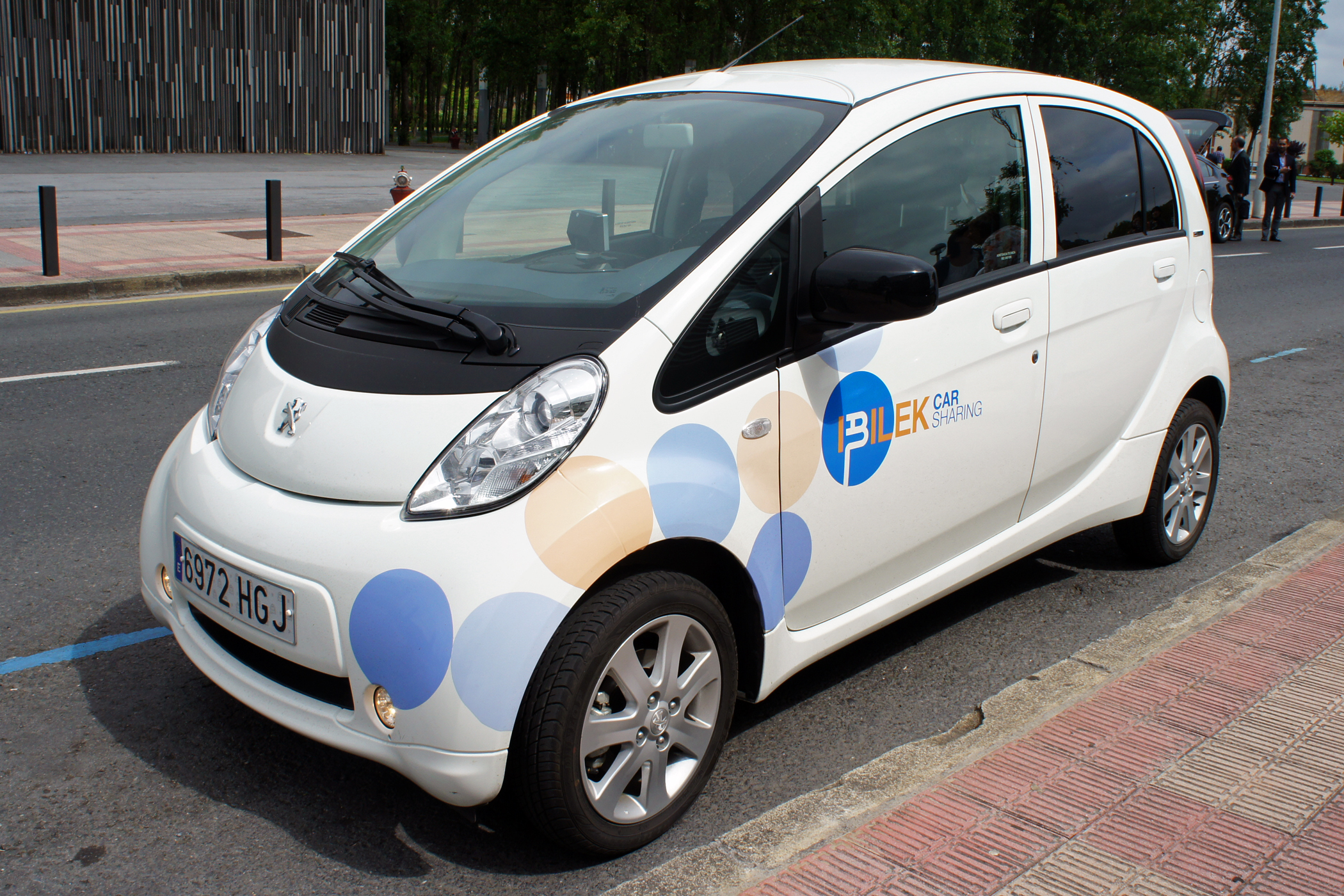
A Peugeot iOn in Bilbao, Spain, operating for the IBILEK car sharing service.

==== Russia ====
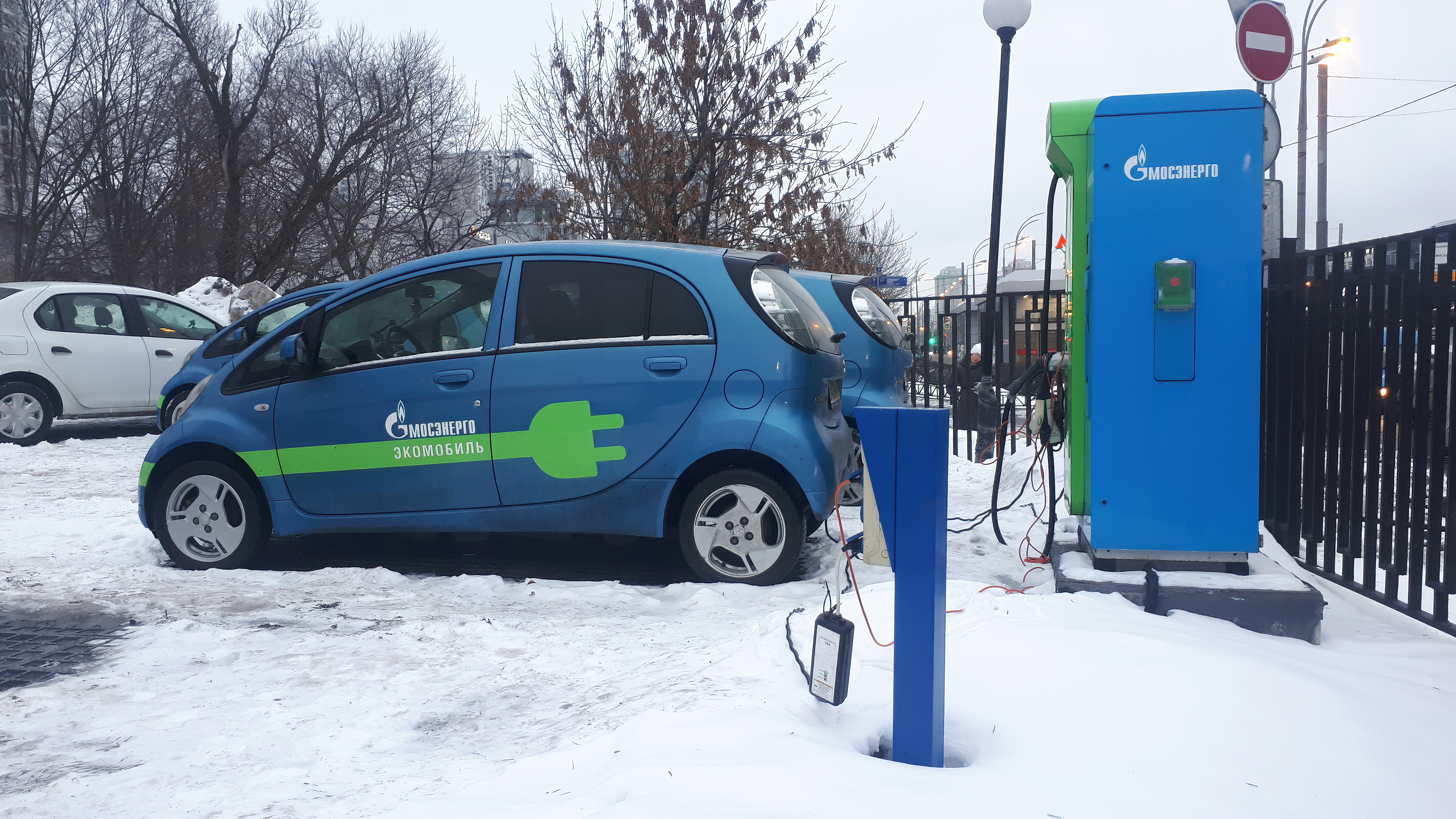

Some cars were bought by Gazprom for a trial operation.

==== Spain ====
Retail sales began in December 2010 and the i-MiEV price starts at €29,153 before sales tax or any government incentives. A total of 233 i-MiEV family electric cars were sold during 2011, representing 58% of all electric vehicles sold in Spain that year. Cumulative sales through December 2013 reached 546 units including 204 iOns, 196 i-MiEVs and 146 C-Zeros.

==== Sweden ====
Since their inception a total of 196 units were registered in Sweden through December 2013, including 92 i MiEVs, 67 C-Zeros, and 37 iOns.

==== Switzerland ====
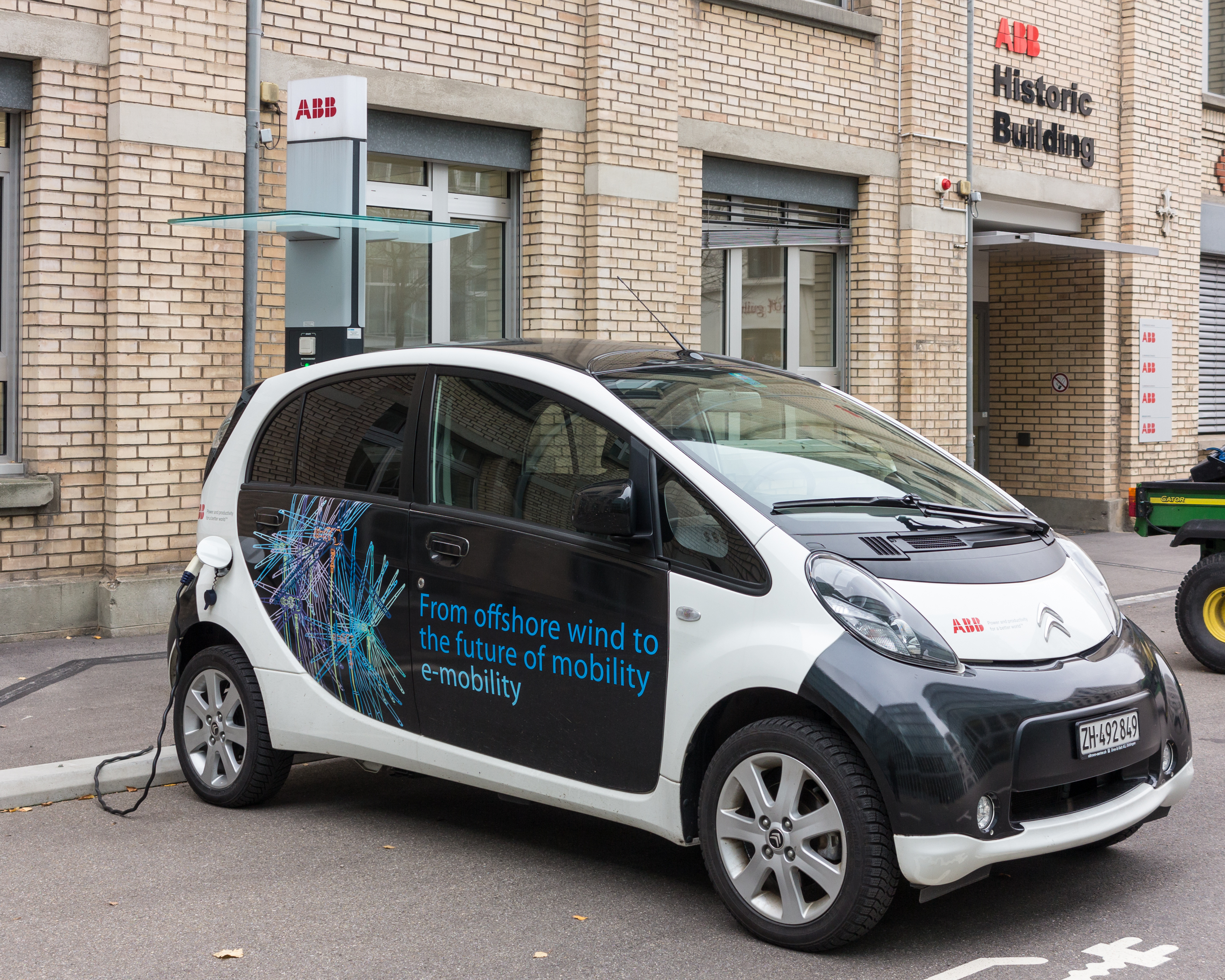
Citroën C-Zero charging in Zurich

Deliveries began in 2011. Cumulative registrations totaled 615 units through December 2013, including 342 i-MiEVs, 155 C-Zeros and 118 iOns. This is one of the few markets that the iMiev remains on sale in, as of 2020, along with Hungary and Croatia.

==== United Kingdom ====
In December 2009, Mitsubishi began an electric vehicle trial in the UK with a fleet of 25 i-MiEVs. The i-MiEV demonstration is part of the project Coventry and Birmingham Low Emission Vehicle Demonstrators (CABLED), which ran in the English Midlands with a variety of vehicles including plug-in hybrids and the extended range electric Jaguar XJ. In March 2010, the company reported that after the first three-month period the trial fleet ran an average of 23 miles (37 km) a day, have been parked 97% of the time, and most of the individual trips were under 5 miles (8 km). Another key finding in the test report is that the vehicles were driven in temperatures as low as −10 °C (14 °F) during the winter period, and it was observed a drop-off in usage during extremely cold weather, when only essential journeys are made.

In March 2010, Mitsubishi announced that the i-MiEV would be sold at a price of £38,699 (~US$55,870), but in August 2010 the company reduced the price to £28,990 (~US$45,100). Sales to the public in the UK began in January 2011, which coincided with the date the £5,000 Plug-in Car Grant came into effect. Mitsubishi authorized 13 sales centres with two in London and the rest spread across England, Scotland and Northern Ireland. In April 2011 Hertz Rent-a-Car added two i-MiEVs to its fleet of vehicles in London and intends to add more across the UK later in 2011. The i-MiEVs are offered as rental vehicles to Hertz on Demand members and these electric cars will be supported by 16 Hertz-installed quick-charge stations located in and around London. A total of 862 units have been registered in the UK through June 2013, including 401 iOns, 260 i MiEVs, and 201 C-Zeros.

In June 2016, reports surfaced that the i-Miev was no longer being sold in the UK, and no more new vehicles would be available.

Mitsubishi have not supported UK cars with the same 10 year traction battery warranty provided in other markets.

=== Japan ===
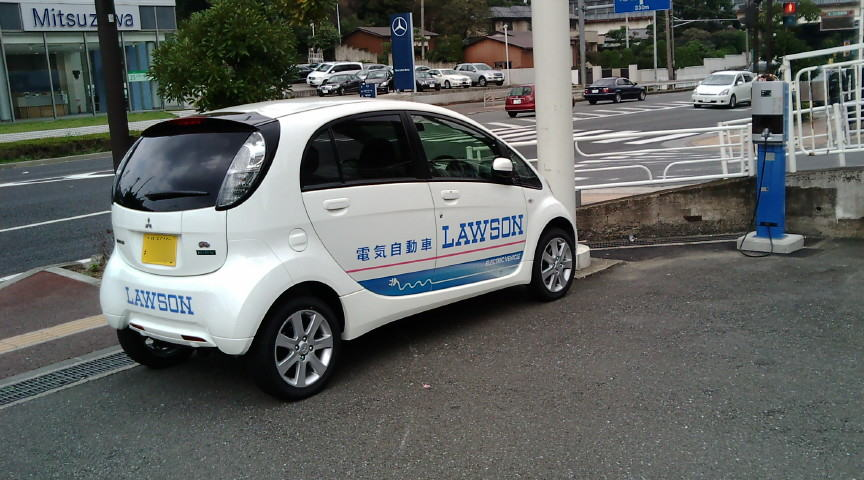
Mitsubishi i-MiEV recharging from an on-street charging station in Japan.

The i-MiEV was launched for fleet customers in Japan in late July 2009, after Mitsubishi's more than 40 years in development of electric vehicles. Initial price was set at ¥4,590,000 (US$46,500). The Japanese government is offering subsidies of up to ¥1,390,000, and some local governments are also offering additional subsidies that could bring the price down to as low as ¥2,200,000. Mitsubishi reduced the price of the vehicle by ¥619,000 (US$6,700) to just below ¥4,000,000 two days before it went for retail sales in Japan in April 2010 to compete with the Nissan Leaf. As of early 2010 there were 60 charging stations in Japan.

In June 2010 Mitsubishi Motors announced that is aiming to cut the price of its electric vehicles to ¥2 million(US$21,890) by fiscal year 2012 to obtain price parity in the showrooms with hybrid electric vehicles. Mitsubishi is expecting that mass production of lithium-ion batteries from its battery plant coming online in April 2012 will allow to reduced battery cost from its current ¥2.5 million to less than ¥1 million. In March 2010, the company said it had received about 2,000 advance orders in Japan for the vehicle. Cumulative sales reached 3,000 units in Japan by October 2010. Sales in the Japanese market raised from 986 in 2009 to 2,340 in 2010, and then stabilized at 2,290 units in 2011 and 2,295 in 2012. Sales fell to 1,491 units during 2013, and to 1,021 units during 2014. As of December 2014, cumulative sales reached 10,423 i-MiEVs since July 2009.

Two new trims levels were launched in the Japanese market in the second half of 2011. Beginning on July 25, the lower-level "M grade" trim will be sold for ¥1,880,000 (US$23,200) after the government subsidy. The "M" trim has a 10.5 kWh battery and its equipment and trim specification were adjusted to allow a more accessible price. The "M" trim range is 120 km (75 mi) on the JC08-cycle. The higher-level "G" trim will be available by mid-August at a price varying from ¥2,600,000 (US$32,100) to ¥3,800,000 (US$47,000). The "G" trim has the same 16.0 kWh battery as the original i-MiEV, but the new trim realizes around a 20% increase in its single charge range on the J08-cycle, offering 180 km (110 mi). The "G" has LED headlamps and rear combination lamps, 15-inch alloy road wheels, leather-wrapped steering wheel and shifter knob and other high-grade equipment, such as a navigation system and heated seats for the driver and front passenger as standard. At the same time, Mitsubishi introduced Minicab-MiEV van and truck variants of its Minicab using the same drivetrain and storage battery options as the "M grade" and "G grade" i-MiEV.

=== United States ===
The first fleet and individual customer deliveries in the U.S. took place in December 2011. Mitsubishi initially announced a base price of US$27,990, but in September 2011 raised the base price to US$29,125 plus the destination charge and prior to the federal tax credit and other incentives available in California and other states. The American version of the Mitsubishi i-MiEV was unveiled at the November 2010 Los Angeles Auto Show. During the LA show, Mitsubishi announced it decided to drop the "MiEV" from the name and the US version will be named simply as "i" electric vehicle.

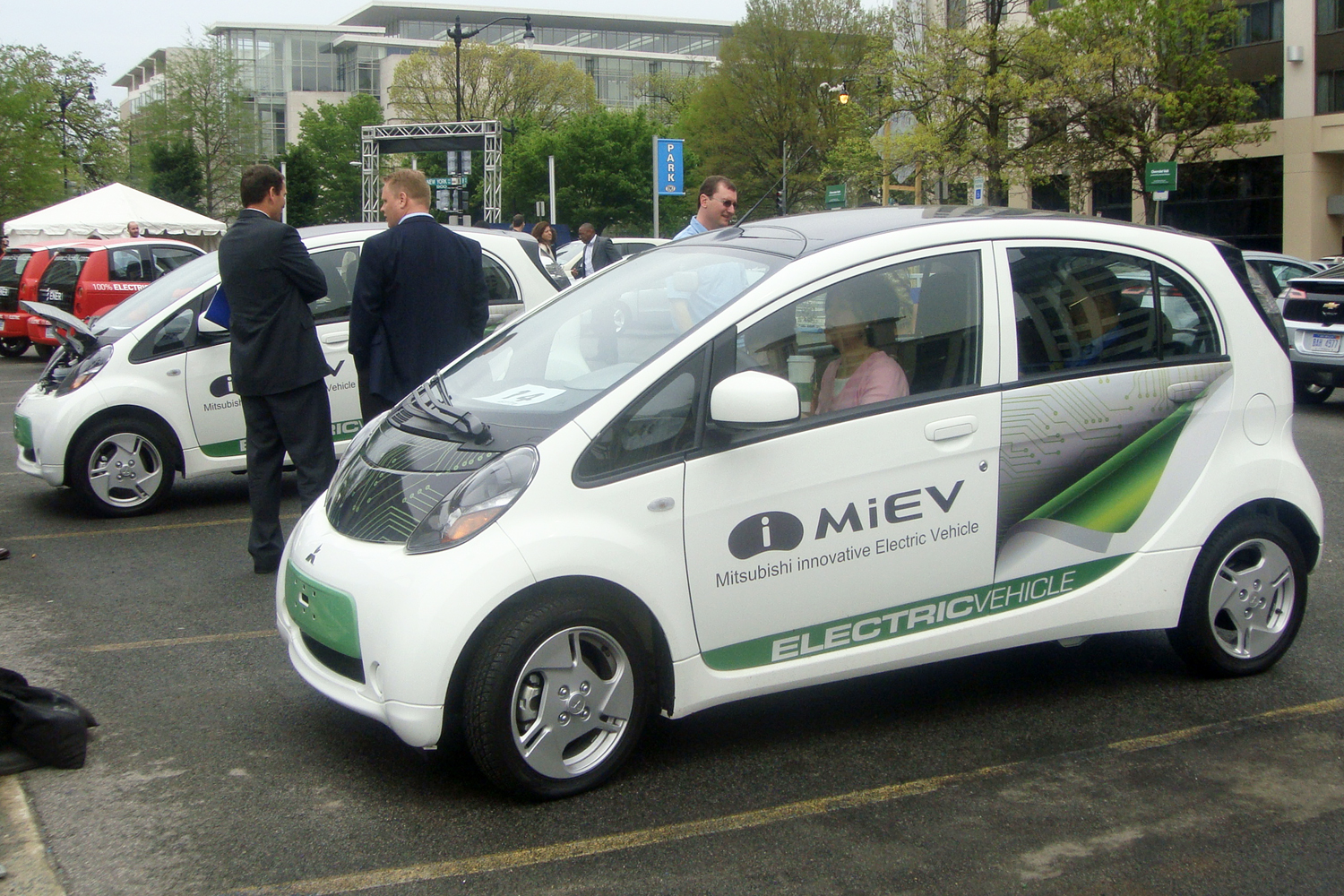
i-MiEV test drive event in Washington, D.C.

The U.S.-only version is enlarged, has redesigned front and rear bumpers, and includes more features than the Japanese and European versions in order to meet crash standards, government mandates, and the preferences of the U.S. consumers. The American version is 285 millimetres (11.2 in) longer than the Japanese version, 110 millimetres (4.3 in) wider, and slightly taller. It also has advanced airbags and the mandated tire-pressure monitoring system (TPMS), has an upgraded interior and features more accessories.

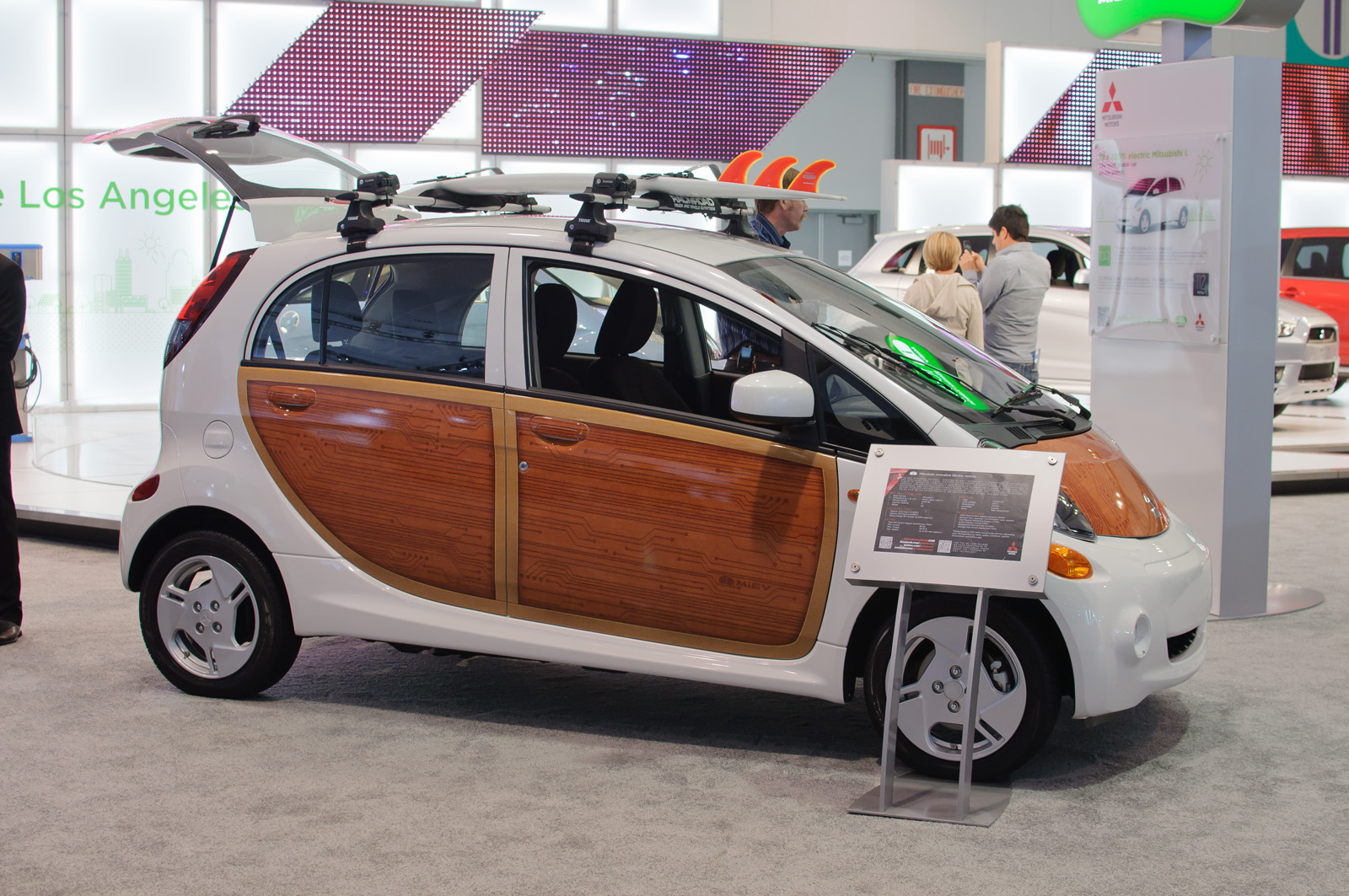
Woody version of the American-spec Mitsubishi i exhibited at the 2011 LA Auto Show

The entry-level ES trim started at US$29,125, the SE trim at US$31,125, and the SE Premium version was priced at US$33,915 including an HDD navigation system and better entertainment and audio options. These prices did not include a US$850 destination charge. For either of the models, available options include a factory-installed CHAdeMO fast-charging port for US$750 and the Cold Zone package, which includes a battery warming system and heated outside mirrors for US$150. The reservation process for the U.S. began on April 22, 2011, and customers were required to pay two deposits: US$299 for the car and US$99.99 for a required home inspection. The carmaker decided to waive the US$100 fee for the first 2,000 people who placed an order and then buy the car. Mitsubishi only accepted PayPal as the method of payment for those online transactions. Mitsubishi began sending order confirmation emails and offering optional accessories by early September 2011. In November 2010, Mitsubishi announced partnerships with Eaton and Best Buy for sales and home installation of recharging units.

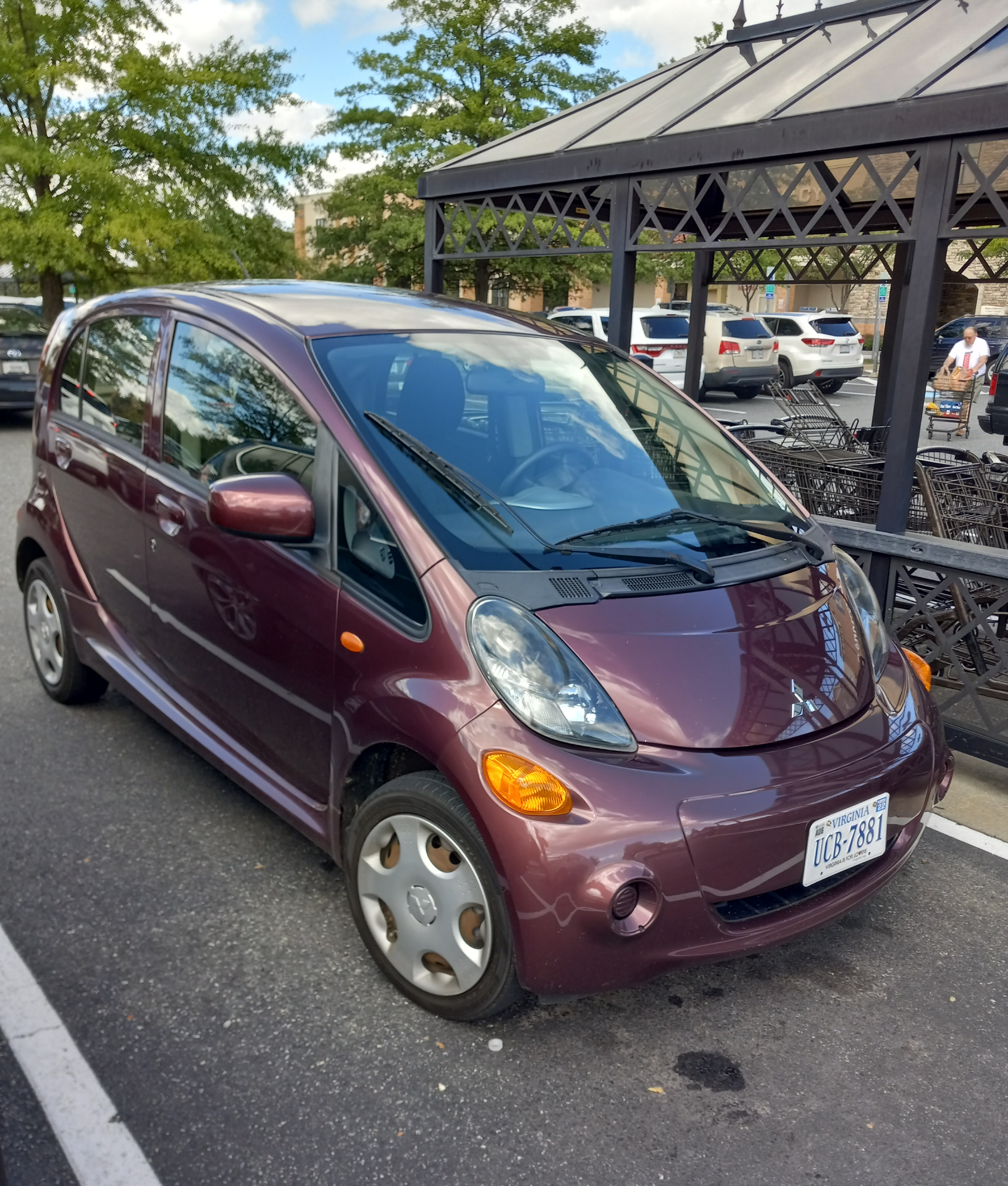
Mitsubishi i-MiEV in Woodbridge, Virginia (front)

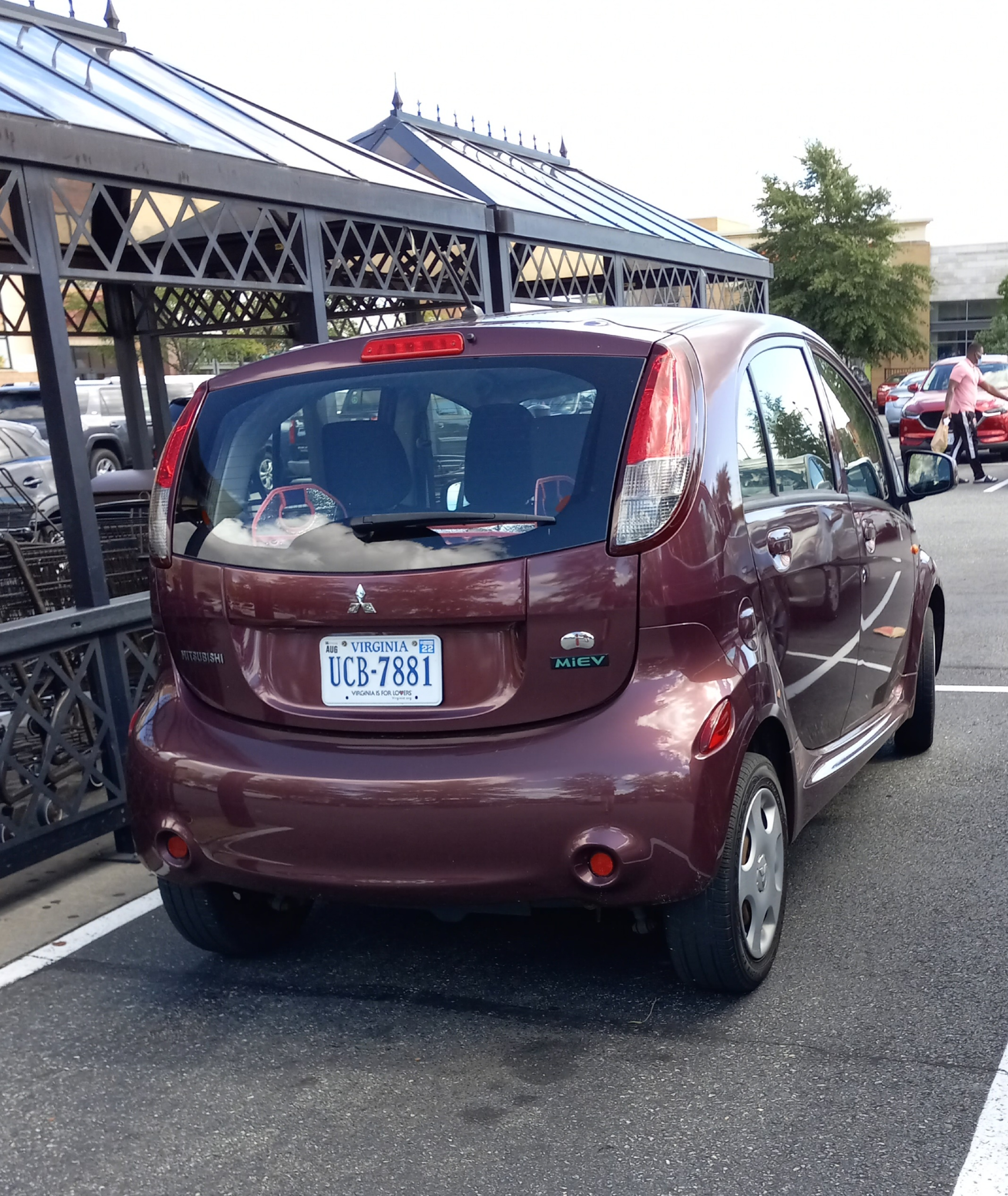
Mitsubishi i-MiEV in Woodbridge, Virginia (rear)

Initial availability was limited and the initial roll-out markets included California, Hawaii, Oregon, and Washington, followed by the Northeastern states. Nationwide availability was expected by mid-2012. The first delivery to a fleet customer took place on December 8, 2011, in San Francisco. The first delivery went to City CarShare, a non-profit carsharing service that operates in San Francisco, Oakland, and Berkeley. The first individual customer delivery took place on Honolulu, Hawaii, on December 12, 2011. Sales increased from 80 units in 2011 to 588 in 2012, and rose to 1,029 during 2013. Sales fell to only 196 in 2014. A total of 1,893 i cars had been sold in the U.S. through December 2014.

Changes to 2014 model year vehicles included driver and front passenger heated seats, CHAdeMO DC quick charge port, battery warming system, heated side view mirrors, rear door speakers, 8A/12A switchable Level 1 charging cable (approximate charge time from near empty to fully charged – 22 hours for 8 amp/14 hours for 12 amp), charge port lamp, leather-covered steering wheel and shift knob, passenger-side vanity mirror with lid, numerous decorative color/trim upgrades, aluminum wheels, front fog lights, new daytime running lights (DRL), black-out door sash trim, and a US$6,130 lower price before incentives.

In August 2017, a Mitsubishi representative confirmed that the i-MiEV had been discontinued in the United States.

=== Other countries ===
Mitsubishi i-MiEV sales price by market (without any government tax credits or grants)
| Country | Sales price | Equivalent US$^{(1)} | Launched/ scheduled |
|---|---|---|---|
| Japan | ¥4.0 million | US$51,570 | Apr 2010 |
| Hong Kong | HK$395,000 | US$50,840 | May 2010 |
| Australia^{(2)} | A$62,240 (2011) | US$63,175 | Jul 2010 |
| Australia^{(2)} | A$48,800 (2012) | US$49,530 | Aug 2011 |
| Germany | €34,990 | US$45,280 | Dec 2010 |
| Spain | €29,153 | US$37,730 | Dec 2010 |
| United Kingdom | £28,990 | US$44,750 | Jan 2011 |
| Costa Rica | ¢30.5 million | US$60,795 | Feb 2011 |
| Chile | CLP27.7 million | US$53,270 | May 2011 |
| Russia | 1,799,000 ₽ | US$55,990 | June 2011 |
| New Zealand | NZ$59,990 | US$46,345 | Jul 2011 |
| United States | US$29,125 | | Dec 2011 |
| Canada | CA$32,998 | US$32,340 | Dec 2011 |
| Sweden | 281,000 kr | US$40,758 | 2011 |
Notes (1): Exchange rates as of December 31, 2011. (2) The 2011 i-MiEV is available for leasing only, at a price of A$1,740/month during 36 months totaling A$62,240. Retail sales only for the 2012 i-MiEV

Chile

The i-MiEV was launched in May 2011 at a price of CLP27,7 million (US$60,000). Initial availability is limited to 25 units. The first public quick charging station in the country was opened in April 2011 in preparation for the arrival of the first i-MiEV electric cars. As of August 2012, only 10 units have been sold. As of 2015 the dealer is no longer selling the i-MiEV, it has been replaced by the Outlander plug-in hybrid.

Costa Rica

The i-MiEV was launched in February 2011 at a price of US$61,500. Costa Rica does not have any government incentives for electric cars. According to Mitsubishi, Costa Rica was selected at the first market launch in the Americas due to its environmental record. Initial availability will be limited to 25 to 50 units. Sales are oriented to supply mainly fleet customers including government agencies and electric companies.

Hong Kong

In December 2009, the Hong Kong Government and other corporation began testing the i-MiEV, totaling 30 vehicles tested until May 2010. Sales to the public in Hong Kong began in May 2010 at a price of HK$395,000 (~US$50,631).

Malaysia

The i-MiEV was released in Malaysia in March 2013 at a price starting at RM136,118 (approx US$43,995), becoming the first electric car sold in the country. Mitsubishi expects to sell more than 50 units during its first year in the market. The Penang Second Bridge highway patrol unit, JKSB Ronda using i-MIEV for patrolling and to provide assistance to commuters on the bridge. Seven charging stations were also set up at the toll plaza on the mainland, two of them being rapid chargers which are able to give an 80 per cent charge in 30 minutes.

New Zealand

Between January and March 2009 the i-MiEV was brought to New Zealand as part of an electric vehicle trial, during which the i-MiEV travelled the entire country, testing infrastructure and demonstrating the vehicle to the public. As of March 2011 there were 8 i-MiEV in use in Wellington, as a field trial sponsored by the Wellington City Council, New Zealand Post, Meridian Energy, The Wellington Company and Mitsubishi Motors. Sales to the public were scheduled for July 2011 at a price of NZ$59,990 (~US$51,325), and the number of units were to be limited.

Russian Federation

The i-MiEV was launched in June 2011 at a price of 1,799,000 ₽ (~US$64,946). The price would be sat at 999,000 ₽ (~US$28,948) on 1 February 2014. There were 211 cars sold in 2013, many of them bought by government organizations. As of 2013–2014 i-MieV was the only electric car sold in Russia.

Singapore

In November 2010 Mitsubishi signed an agreement with the Singaporean government to introduce electric vehicles in the country. Mitsubishi will supply 25 i-MiEVs in 2011 to the Economic Development Board, the Energy Market Authority and the Land Transport Authority, which are part of a multi-agency EV task force. This agreement is part of a three-year US$20 million test program that will deploy charging infrastructure for electric vehicles and evaluate the cost benefits of EVs for future adoption. The delivery of the first batch of 10 i-MiEV electric cars was scheduled for May 2011.

Thailand

In December 2010, Mitsubishi Motors and the government of Thailand agreed to start fleet testing electric vehicles for a possible launch of i-MiEV. In July 2011, a new agreement was signed to begin the trials with the participation of the Metropolitan Electricity Authority (MEA) and PEA ENCOM International (PEA), two of Thailand's electricity distribution companies.

United Arab Emirates

A test fleet of 10 i-MiEVs was deployed in Masdar City in Abu Dhabi in 2011 as part of a one-year pilot to test a point-to-point transportation solution for the city as complement of its sustainable public transportation systems, the Personal Rapid Transit (PRT) and the Freight Rapid Transit (FRT), both of which consist of automated electric-powered vehicles.

Additionally the Dubai Mall owns a small fleet of Peugeot iOns, intended to be delivery vehicles.

=== Global sales ===
By the end of April 2019, the combined sales of the i-MiEV and Minicab MiEV had reached over 31,000 units. Including the rebadged Peugeot iOn and Citroën C-Zero sold in Europe, by the end of February 2018 a total of 46,827 i-MiEV family passenger cars had been sold worldwide since 2009.

The following table presents total retail sales by year since deliveries of the i-MiEV began in July 2009 for the top selling national markets by variant (Mitsubishi i-MiEV/i, Peugeot iOn and Citroën C-Zero) through June 2014.

Mitsubishi i-MiEV family sales by top national markets between 2009 and June 2014
| Country/Region | | Total | 2014 CYTD^{(1)} | 2013 | 2012 | 2011 | 2010 | 2009 |
|---|---|---|---|---|---|---|---|---|
| European Union | C-Zero | 6,127 | 464 | 651 | 3,147 | 1,830 | 35 | |
| European Union | i-On | 5,774 | 269 | 455 | 3,091 | 1,926 | 33 | |
| European Union | i-MiEV | 5,583 | 341 | 901 | 1,636 | 2,608 | 97 | |
| European Union | All variants | 17,484 | 1,074 | 2,007 | 7,874 | 6,364 | 165 | |
| Japan | i-MiEV^{(1)} | 9,909 | 507 | 1,491 | 2,295 | 2,290 | 2,340 | 986 |
| United States | i | 1,794 | 97 | 1,029 | 588 | 80 | | |
| Canada | i-MiEV | 441 | 54 | 168 | 196 | 23 | | |
| Australia | i-MiEV | 252 | 0^{(2)} | 15 | 95 | 30 | 112 | |
| Total top markets | | 29,880 | 1,732 | 4,710 | 11,048 | 8,787 | 2,617 | 986 |
Notes: (1) CYTD: current year-to-date sales through June 2014. (2) No longer available in Australia due to low sales.

== Awards and recognition ==
- "2009 Japan Automotive Hall of Fame Car Technology of the Year" award in October 2009.
- "Japanese Car of the Year Most Advanced Technology" awarded during the 41st Tokyo Motor Show in October 2009.
- "Ecobest 2009" by AUTOBEST in January 2010.
- "Environment Special Grand Prize" awarded during the 25th International Automobile Festival, Paris, France in February 2010.
- The i-MiEV was one of the five finalists to the 2011 Green Car Vision Award.
- The 2012 model year American-spec i-MiEV was one of the five finalists for the 2012 Green Car of the Year.
- The American-spec i-MiEV was rated first in the "2012 Greenest Vehicles of the Year" list elaborated by the American Council for an Energy-Efficient Economy.
- The 2012 model year American-spec i-MiEV ranked first in United States Environmental Protection Agency’s (EPA) 2012 Annual Fuel Economy Guide, and between November 2011 and June 2012 ranked as the most efficient EPA certified vehicle in the U.S. for all fuels ever, until it was surpassed by the Honda Fit EV.

== See also ==
- Government incentives for plug-in electric vehicles
- List of electric cars currently available
- List of battery electric vehicles
- List of modern production plug-in electric vehicles
- MIEV – Mitsubishi in-wheel motor electric vehicle
- Mitsubishi Concept PX-MiEV (plug-in hybrid)
- Mitsuoka Like
