= Removal Units =

Tradable allowance to emit greenhouse gases

A Removal Unit (RMU) was a tradable carbon credit or 'Kyoto unit' representing an allowance to emit one tonne of greenhouse gases absorbed by a removal or carbon sink activity in an Annex I country.

Removal Units were generated and issued by Kyoto Protocol Annex I Parties for carbon absorption by land use, land-use change, and forestry (LULUCF) activities such as reforestation.

== Application ==
Under Article 3.3 of the Kyoto Protocol, Annex I Parties could recognise the biosequestration, the removal of carbon dioxide from the atmosphere by carbon sinks, created by direct human-induced afforestation, reforestation and deforestation since 1990, in determining whether they met their emission reduction commitments under the Protocol. When sinks resulted in the net removal of greenhouse gases from the atmosphere, Annex I Parties could issue removal units (RMUs).

== See also ==
- Emissions trading
- Flexible mechanisms
- Assigned amount units
- Certified Emission Reduction
- Emission Reduction Unit
