= Assigned amount unit =

An assigned amount unit was a tradable "Kyoto unit" or "carbon credit" representing an allowance to emit greenhouse gases comprising "one metric tonne of carbon dioxide equivalent, calculated using global warming potentials". Assigned amount units were issued up to the level of initial "assigned amount" of an Annex 1 Party to the Kyoto Protocol.

The "assigned amounts" were the Kyoto Protocol Annex B emission targets (or "quantified emission limitation and reduction objectives") expressed as levels of allowed emissions over the 2008–2012 commitment period.

== Application ==
Article 17 of the Kyoto Protocol allowed emissions trading between Annex B Parties (countries). Parties that had "assigned amount units" to spare because of reductions in emissions below their Kyoto commitment set out in Article 3 and Annex B could sell those units to countries that had emissions exceeding their targets. Article 17 also required that any such emissions trading must be supplemental to domestic action for the purpose of meeting quantified emission limitation and reduction commitments.

== See also ==
- Certified Emission Reduction
- Emission Reduction Unit
- Removal Units
- Voluntary Emissions Reduction
- Flexible mechanisms
- List of Kyoto Protocol signatories
