= Certified emission reduction =

Type of carbon emission credit

Certified emission reduction units (CERs) by country of origin October 2012

Certified emission reduction units (CERs) monthly spot prices 2012

Certified emission reductions (CERs) are a type of emission unit (or carbon credits) issued by the Clean Development Mechanism (CDM) Executive Board for emission reductions achieved by CDM projects and verified by a DOE (Designated Operational Entity) under the rules of the Kyoto Protocol.

CERs can be used by Annex 1 countries in order to comply with their emission limitation targets order to comply with their obligations to surrender CERs or emission reduction units (ERUs) for the CO_{2} emissions of their installations. CERs can be held by governmental and private entities on electronic accounts with the UN.

CERs can be purchased from the primary market (purchased from an original party that makes the reduction) or secondary market (resold from a marketplace).

At present, most of the approved CERs are recorded in CDM Registry accounts only. It is only when the CER is actually sitting in an operator's trading account that its value can be monetized through being traded. The UNFCCC's International Transaction Log has already validated and transferred CERs into the accounts of some national climate registries, although European operators are waiting for the European Commission to facilitate the transfer of their units into the registries of their Member States.

Temporary CERs and Long CERs are special types of CERs issued for forestry projects. They are two ways of accounting for non-permanence in forestry CDM project activities. Temporary CER or tCER is a CER issued for an afforestation or reforestation project activity under the CDM which expires at the end of the commitment period following the one during which it was issued. Long-term CER or lCER is a CER issued for an afforestation or reforestation project activity which expires at the end of its crediting period.

In August 2008, prices for CERS were $20 a tonne. By September 2012, prices for CERS had collapsed to below $5. This was in response to the Eurozone debt crisis reducing industrial activity and the over-allocation of emission allowances under the European Union Emissions Trading Scheme. The Economist described the Clean Development Mechanism as a "complete disaster in the making" and "in need of a radical overhaul". The Guardian also reported the prolonged downward trend in the price of CERs, which had been traded for as much as $20 (£12.50) a tonne before the 2008 financial crisis to less than $3. In October 2012, CER prices fell to a new low of 1.36 euros a tonne on the London ICE Futures Europe exchange. In October 2012 Thomson Reuters Point Carbon calculated that the oversupply of units from the Clean Development Mechanism and Joint Implementation would be 1,400 million units for the period up to 2020. Point Carbon predicted that CER prices would to drop from €2 to 50 cents. On 12 December 2012 CER prices reached another record low of 31 cents.

In recent times and in an attempt to highlight the drawbacks of carbon offsetting schemes, the term "emission reduction" or "certified emission reduction" is used to design common carbon offsets that may be certified by organizations such as Gold Standard or Verra.
