= Emission reduction unit =

Unit of measurement for greenhouse gases

The emission reduction unit (ERU) was an emissions unit issued under a Joint Implementation project in terms of the Kyoto Protocol. An ERU represented a reduction of greenhouse gases under the Joint Implementation mechanism, where it represented one tonne of CO_{2} equivalent reduced.

== Description ==
To allow comparison between the different effects of gases on the environment, scientists have defined multipliers for gases that compare their greenhouse potency (global warming potential) relative to that of carbon dioxide.

One example of a Joint Implementation project resulting in an emission reduction unit, was the production of biogases by landfill sites. These gases consist of mainly methane which escapes to the atmosphere if it is not collected. The main reason for dealing with methane is that it has a 100-year global warming potential multiplier of 25 compared to carbon dioxide (i.e. has 25 times the greenhouse potency). Collection of methane is usually accompanied by its combustion. Burning one tonne of methane produces nearly 3 tonnes of CO_{2}, thus reducing its greenhouse effect by (25−3=22) ERU.

In December 2012, ERU prices crashed to a low of 15 euro cents before recovering to 23c after news that EU’s Climate Change Committee was to vote on a ban of ERUs from countries that have not signed up to a second commitment period under the Kyoto Protocol.

In January 2013, Bloomberg reported that emission reduction unit prices declined 89 percent in 2012.

== See also ==
- Assigned amount unit
