= Homaio =

French company

- Type: SAS
- Industry: Carbon markets
- Founded: 2023; 3 years ago
- Founder: Valentin Lautier
- Headquarters: Paris, France
- Key people: Valentin Lautier (CEO)
- Website: www.homaio.com

Homaio is a French company headquartered in Paris. It operates an investment platform providing access to carbon emissions allowance markets.

== Background ==
The company offers financial products backed by carbon emissions allowances issued under the European Union Emissions Trading System (EU ETS), enabling retail investors to gain exposure to this market.

== History ==
Homaio was founded in Paris in 2023 by Valentin Lautier. The company was established to provide retail investors with access to the carbon emissions allowance market, which had historically been reserved for institutional and industrial participants.

In September 2024, Homaio launched its investment platform dedicated to European carbon emissions allowances.

In March 2026, Homaio raised €3.6 million in a funding round led by RAISE Ventures and the Eren Group. Existing investors XAnge and Redstone also participated in the round, increasing their stakes in the company. Following the transaction, the total amount raised by Homaio exceeded €5 million.

In July 2026, Homaio expanded its activities to the United Kingdom carbon allowance market (UKA).

== See also ==
- Carbon emission trading
- European Union Emissions Trading System
