= Greenhouse gas emissions by China =

China has the most total annual emissions (area of rectangle) of any nation, and has higher than average per capita emissions.

Cumulatively over time, China is the second-largest contributor nation to global economic damage from emissions, following the U.S.

The total greenhouse gas emissions of the People's Republic of China are the world's highest, accounting for 35% of the world's total, in 2023, according to the International Energy Agency. The country's emissions may have peaked in 2024 or 2025.

When measuring production-based emissions, China emitted over 12.6 gigatonnes (Gt) CO_{2}eq of greenhouse gases in 2023, 35% of the world's total. When measuring in consumption-based terms, which adds emissions associated with imported goods and extracts those associated with exported goods, China accounted for 13 gigatonnes (Gt) or 25% of global emissions in 2019.

Greenhouse gas emissions stem mainly from coal burning, including coal power, coal mining, and blast furnaces producing iron and steel. 79% of CO2 emissions are from the burning of coal. According to the Carbon Majors Database, Chinese state coal production alone accounts for 14% of historical global emissions. In 2024, China's total historical greenhouse gas emissions surpassed those of the European Union (EU), but trailed those of the United States.

As of 2019, the country's greenhouse gas emissions exceeded the combined emissions of the developed world. China's per capita emissions correspond to over 10.1 tonnes CO_{2eq} emitted per person each year, over the world average and the EU average but lower than the second largest emitter of greenhouse gases, the United States, with its 17.6 tonnes per person, according to a 2021 analysis by the Rhodium Group. Analysis by Our World in Data also puts China's per capita emissions at over the world and EU averages but less than averages in Australia, Canada, and the U.S. Accounting for historic emissions, all OECD countries together produced four times more CO2 in cumulative emissions than China, due to developed countries' earlier start in industrialization. Overall, China is a net exporter of greenhouse emissions.

China's first nationally determined contribution target was laid out at the Paris Agreement in 2016. It was revised in 2021 and 2025. China has committed to peak emissions by 2030 and net zero by 2060. According to various analyses, China is estimated to overachieve its renewable energy capacity and emission reduction goals early, though long-term plans are still required to combat global climate change and meeting the Nationally Determined Contribution (NDC) targets.

== Overall data ==
Since 1850, China trailed only the United States in cumulative contributions of greenhouse gases.

Since 2000, rising CO_{2} emissions in China and the rest of world have eclipsed the output of the United States and Europe.

The per person CO_{2} emissions in China are rising but still much lower than in the United States.

Since 2006, China has been the world's largest emitter of CO_{2} annually. As of 2023, it had the 34th highest greenhouse gas emissions per capita. In 2023, China produced 35% of global CO_{2} emissions, according to the International Energy Agency. According to estimates provided by the Netherlands Environmental Assessment Agency, China's carbon dioxide emissions in 2006 amounted to 6.2 billion tons, and the United States' co-production in the same year was 5.8 billion tons. In 2006, China's carbon dioxide emissions were 8 percent higher than America's, the agency said. In 2019, China is estimated to have emitted 27% of the world's greenhouse gases, followed by the US with 11%, then India with 6.6%. By 2020, China produced 64% to 66% of global emissions for the two potent greenhouse gases of tetrafluoromethane and hexafluoroethane, according to a study by the Massachusetts Institute of Technology.

=== Impact of 2019–20 coronavirus outbreak ===
A temporary slowdown in manufacturing, construction, transportation, and overall economic activity during the beginning of the 2019–20 coronavirus outbreak reduced China's greenhouse gas emissions by "about a quarter," as reported in February 2020. Nonetheless, for the year April 1, 2020 – March 31, 2021, China's CO_{2} emissions reached a record high: nearly 12 billion metric tons. Additionally, China's carbon emissions during the first quarter of 2021 were higher than in the first quarters of both 2019 and 2020. Temporary reductions in carbon emissions due to lockdowns and initial economic relief efforts have limited long-term consequences, while the future direction of fiscal stimulus plays a more significant role in influencing long-term carbon emissions.

=== Recent trends ===
China experienced the largest increase in emissions at approximately 565 million tonnes in 2023, exacerbated by a historic decrease in hydropower, pushing its per capita emissions 15% higher than those in advanced economies, according to the International Energy Agency.

In 2024, China recorded a 3% decrease in greenhouse gas emissions compared to the previous year. This development suggests that emissions might have peaked sooner than the 2030 target initially set. The reduction was largely attributed to an expansion in wind and solar power capacities, which largely covered the increased demand for electricity, coupled with a downturn in the property sector that resulted in lower emissions from industries like steel and cement manufacturing. However, several challenges remain, including the technical difficulties of integrating solar energy into the existing power grid and a continued dependence on coal, which experienced a 2% increase in use in 2023. S&P Global also reported that China approved record-breaking coal capacity in 2022, leading to environmental concerns. Meanwhile, they noted China's capacity factor for coal plants was continuously decreasing, while retirements of old coal plants were accelerating, with data indicating China's greenhouse emissions would peak as early as 2024, due to incremental power demand being met by new renewables installations.

In the first quarter of 2025, China recorded greenhouse gas emissions in reverse due to newly operational clean energy sources. Analysts believed that, if the trend continues, it would signify a structural decline in Chinese emissions, which is driven by clean power generation, instead of a financial crisis or economic slowdown.

In August 2025, Carbon Brief suggested that adding coal capacity did not translate into higher coal usage or emissions, as coal was used for residual load. It also noted that China planned to use coal as a flexible supporting energy backup and aimed to improve system flexibility, though technical limitations still presented. Foreign Policy reported that China's decarbonization efforts continued to accelerate despite ongoing coal use. This progress was attributed to a systematic reduction in greenhouse gas emissions across sectors such as transportation and petrochemicals, alongside a surge in non-fossil energy capacity in 2022, including advancements in energy generation, storage, and grid utilization. The article noted that local energy security needs drove China's construction of new coal power plants and did not reflect the broader national trend in energy development, nor did it significantly hinder the country's decarbonization pace. CarbonBrief said in February 2026 that China's CO2 emissions have been falling for two straight years. It notes that emissions from fossil fuels rose 0.1 percent but they declined from cement by 7 percent. Its carbon intensity (fossil emissions per unit of GDP) levels fell by 4.7 percent in 2025.

== Emissions by sources ==
Most CO_{2} emissions in China is from coal

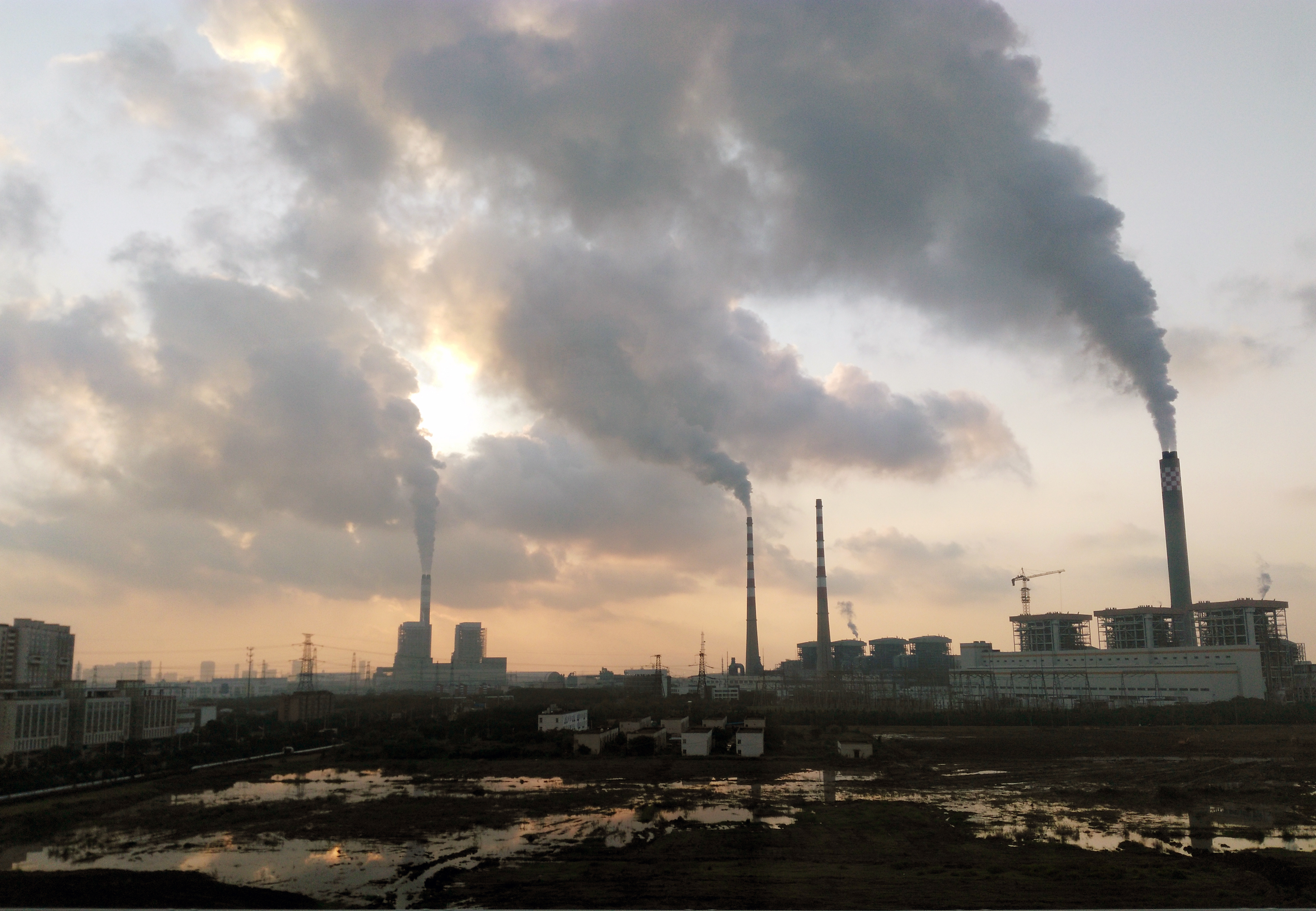
Jiangsu Nantong coal-fired power station

=== Energy production ===
According to the Carbon Majors Database, Chinese state coal production accounts for 14% of historic global emissions, more than double the proportion of the former Soviet Union.

Power is estimated as the largest emitter, with 27% of greenhouse gases produced in 2020 generated by the power sector. Most electricity in China comes from coal, which accounted for 65% of the electricity generation mix in 2019. Electricity generation by renewables has been increasing, with the construction of wind and solar plants doubling from 2019 to 2020.

According to Natural Resources Defense Council, the Chinese power sector is estimated to hit the carbon emission peak around 2029.

In 2020, China continued to build coal power plants but promised to "phase down" coal use from 2026. In 2025, China brought 78 gigawatts of new coal-fired power capacity online. In 2025, Carbon Brief reported that added coal capacity did not translate into higher coal usage or emissions, due to coal were being used as energy backups, as the country deployed large amounts of renewable energy.

Evolution of CO_{2} emissions by sector in China, 2000 - 2021
	Electricity and heat producers	Industry	Transport	Residential	Commercial and public services	Agriculture	Unspecified Final Consumption	Other energy industries
2000	1426.85	904.045	248.48	216.849	57.268	47.992	47.512	148.356
2001	1506.574	958.838	254.25	216.959	60.767	51.397	50.102	154.574
2002	1686.007	996.753	276.444	220.345	63.26	56.62	55.03	154.476
2003	1996.101	1136.149	313.144	237.802	70.678	64.753	64.277	182.587
2004	2203.919	1497.944	371.136	265.471	87.1	73.844	67.972	172.197
2005	2373.239	1935.745	397.312	273.592	91.868	83.689	72.48	179.468
2006	2686.187	2083.31	434.811	285.571	98.547	87.65	73.249	212.467
2007	2930.614	2274.395	468.576	291.352	106.923	84.966	75.95	240.48
2008	2961.79	2409.719	507.067	278.806	104.442	81.955	78.504	246.683
2009	3143.741	2601.242	517.074	281.312	110.345	84.198	81.099	311.912
2010	3477.506	2844.073	568.779	297.63	118.769	88.047	81.307	354.473
2011	3954.71	3004.769	621.89	309.302	131.414	92.084	85.456	369.403
2012	4076.159	3042.033	686.126	316.37	140.844	95.651	90.286	374.573
2013	4347.397	3068.123	741.094	329.858	146.711	103.245	95.234	395.549
2014	4389.763	3094.686	770.35	344.191	142.556	104.955	92.268	299.69
2015	4266.271	2995.88	828.462	364.732	150.115	108.81	93.217	327.493
2016	4410.465	2859.402	845.356	374.069	149.073	111.932	89.865	287.538
2017	4705.733	2696.33	877.815	384.552	145.497	114.409	78.904	329.597
2018	5071.184	2790.824	950.956	360.327	133.548	105.085	66.921	309.918
2019	5238.13	2795.073	944.372	332.787	127.773	101.416	57.667	352.331
2020	5376.577	2852.616	901.961	338.289	116.773	102.119	56.31	308.675
2021	5943.08	2832.322	969.447	332.81	112.121	99.358	46.885	312.513

=== Energy consumption ===
According to the 2016 Chinese Statistical Yearbook published by China's National Bureau of Statistics, China's energy consumption was 430,000 (10,000 tons of Standard Coal Equivalent), including 64% coal, 18.1% crude oil, 5.9% natural gas, 12.0% primary electricity, and other energy. Since 2011, the percentage of coal has decreased, and the percentage of crude oil, natural gas, primary electricity, and other energy have increased.

China experienced an increase in electricity demand and usage in 2017 as the economy accelerated. According to the Climate Data Explorer published by World Resources Institute, China, the European Union, and the U.S. contributed to more than 50% of global greenhouse gas emissions. In 2016, China's greenhouse gas emissions accounted for 26% of total global emissions. The energy industry has been the biggest contributor to greenhouse gas emissions since the last decade.

=== Industry ===
In terms of industrial production, China created 1.26 Gt of greenhouse gases in 2020. Industrial production accounts for 22.76% of all China's GHG emissions in the latest Climate TRACE data for 2022.

==== Construction ====
Urbanization in China increased energy consumption and emissions related to the construction industry.

Cement is estimated to be 15% of emissions but only a tenth of companies are reporting data as of 2021.

==== Iron and steel ====
Steel is estimated at 15% to 20% of emissions and consolidation of the industry may help.

=== Transportation ===
Transport was estimated in 2021 to be less than 10% of the country's emissions but growing.

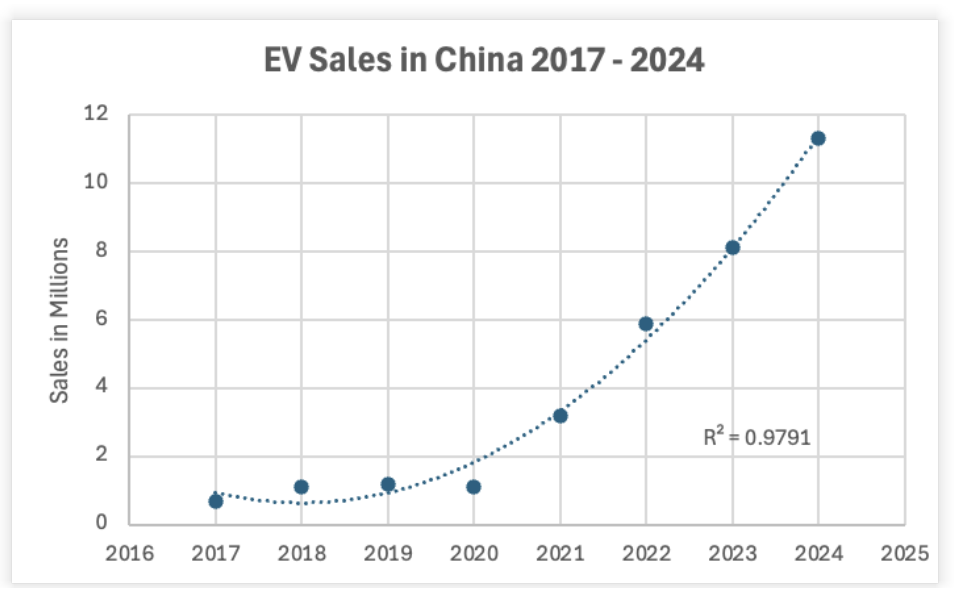

=== Agriculture ===
Agriculture accounts for 7.65% of China's greenhouse gas emissions in 2022.

=== Waste ===
China also produces large amounts of greenhouse gases such as methane (CH_{4}), carbon dioxide (CO_{2}) and nitrous oxide (N_{2}O) in the process of treating waste. In the 2022 Climate Trace statistics, waste treatment accounts for 7.06% of China's total greenhouse gas emissions. Waste disposal is the fourth largest source of GHG emissions in China, and landfills and incineration still dominate municipal waste disposal in China. As a result of the Chinese government's policy of mandatory waste separation in 11 prefectural-level cities, the GHG emissions from waste disposal are decreasing at an efficiency of 0.1% per year, which is effective, but the implementation of waste separation needs to be strengthened. Most municipal solid waste is sent to landfill.

=== Coal mine methane ===
China is by far the largest emitter of methane from coal mines. China produces over 14% of global methane emissions.

== Mitigation ==
The annual amount of coal plant capacity being retired increased into the mid-2010s. However, the rate of retirement has since stalled, and global coal phase-out is not yet compatible with the goals of the Paris Climate Agreement.

In parallel with retirement of some coal plant capacity, other coal plants are still being added, though the annual amount of added capacity has been declining since the 2010s.

China is implementing some policies to mitigate climate change, most of which aim to constrain coal consumption. The Nationally Determined Contribution (NDC) of China set goals and committed to peak CO_{2} emissions by 2030 at the latest, and increase the use of non-fossil fuel energy carriers, taking up 20% of the total primary energy supply. If China successfully reached NDC's targets, the GHG emissions level would be 12.8–14.3 GtCO_{2}e in 2030, reducing 64% to 70% of emission intensity below 2005 levels. China has surpassed its solar deployment and wind energy deployment targets for 2020.

A 2011 Lawrence Berkeley National Laboratory report predicted that Chinese CO_{2} emissions would peak around 2030. This is because in many areas, such as infrastructure, housing, commercial buildings, appliances per household, fertilizers, and cement production, a maximum intensity will be reached and replacement will take the place of new demand. The 2030 emissions peak also became China's pledge at the Paris COP21 summit. Carbon emission intensity may decrease as policies become strengthened and more effectively implemented, including by more effective financial incentives, and as less carbon-intensive energy supplies are deployed. In a "baseline" computer model CO_{2} emissions were predicted to peak in 2033; in an "Accelerated Improvement Scenario", they were predicted to peak in 2027. China also established 10 binding environmental targets in its Thirteenth Five-Year Plan (2016–2020). These include an aim to reduce carbon intensity by 18% by 2020, as well as a binding target for renewable energy at 15% of total energy, raised from under 12% in the Twelfth Five-Year Plan. According to BloombergNEF the levelized cost of electricity from new large-scale solar power has been below existing coal-fired power stations since 2021.

=== Policy ===
China ratified the Kyoto Protocol as a non-Annex B party without binding targets, and ratified the Paris Agreement to fight climate change. In 2020, China's fourteenth five-year plan contained key climate- and energy-related ideas for energy transition and global efforts to tackle climate change.

==== NDC Targets ====
As of 2025, China laid out three pledges of the Intended Nationally Determined Contribution (INDC), in 2016, 2021, and 2025.

The first NDC target was laid in 2016, with China establishing 10 binding environmental targets in its Thirteenth Five-Year Plan (2016–2020). These include an aim to reduce carbon intensity by 18% by 2020, as well as a binding target for renewable energy at 15% of total energy, raised from under 12% in the Twelfth Five-Year Plan. The Thirteenth Five-Year Plan also sets, for the first time, a cap on total energy use from all sources: no more than 5 billion tons of coal through 2020.

In 2025, China announced a plan to reduce ten percent of the country's total greenhouse gas emissions by 2030.

==== Commentary ====
China's target was described as being too conservative by media outlets and other countries. Many climate analysts noted criticisms would be expected but unwarranted, given China had a track record of "underpromise but overdeliver" its climate goals for cultural and political reasons. Li Shuo of the Asia Society Policy Institute indicated that China's target "should be seen as a floor rather than a ceiling." He also argued that ambitious numbers provided by Western countries were more prone to political backsliding, leading to an illusion of progress.

China's pledge contradicts the United States, which was retreating from climate change-related mitigation development and leadership. The New York Times noted that China achieved its previous climate goals about half a decade early. The Times argued that China remained committed to addressing climate change, but held grievances against the developed world for polluting heavily in the past, and urged them to shoulder greater responsibility.

Jonathan Watts, writing for The Guardian, argued that China's expansion in clean-energy capacity alongside locally driven coal development requires nuanced narratives about its climate responsibility and highlighted the need to assess China's progress and choices within context.

British think tank Chatham House noted that, if China continues to outperform its NDC targets, the country could reshape the 'green technology' international order, replacing the United States in leadership positions. China was already leading in the global investment, research, development, manufacturing, and implementation of green technologies, which would be beneficial for climate change mitigation, but also trigger anxieties in Europe and other parts of the world due to political, economic, and security distrust.

==== Domestic policy and laws ====
===== Forest Law of the People's Republic of China (1998) =====
The aim of this law was to conserve and rationally exploit forest resources. It accelerated territorial afforestation and cultivation while also ensuring forest product management, production, and supply in order to meet socialist construction requirements.

===== Energy Conservation Law (2007) =====
The aim of this law was to strengthen energy conservation, especially for key energy-using institutions, as well as to encourage energy efficiency and energy-saving technology. The legislation allowed the government to promote and facilitate the use of renewable energy in a variety of applications.

==== Policy measures in advance of 2008 Beijing Olympics ====
Domestic and international pressure prompted policy responses to reduce China's emissions in advance of the 2008 Beijing Olympics. Policy measures enacted by China's central government included closing more than 1,100 factories in the metropolitan area, banning trucks in Beijing, and restricting passenger vehicle usage to alternate days.

===== Renewable Energy Act (2009) =====
This Act outlines the responsibilities of the government, businesses, and other users in the production and use of renewable energy. It includes policies and targets relating to mandatory grid connectivity, market control legislation, differentiated pricing, special funds, and tax reliefs, as well as a target of 15 percent renewable energy by 2020.

===== 12th Five-Year Plan (2011-2015) =====
The 12th Five-Year Plan sought to make domestic consumption and development more economically equitable and environmentally friendly. It also shifted the economy's focus away from heavy industry and resource-intensive manufacturing and into a more consumer-driven, resource-efficient economy.

===== The National Strategy for Climate Change Adaptation (2013) =====
The strategy established clear guidelines and principles for adapting to and mitigating climate change. It includes interventions such as early-warning identification and information-sharing systems at the national and regional levels, an ocean disaster monitoring system, and coastal restoration to protect water supplies, reduce soil erosion, and improve disaster prevention.

===== National Plan For Tackling Climate Change (2014-2020) =====
The National Plan For Tackling Climate Change is a national law that includes prevention, adaptation, scientific study, and public awareness. By 2020, China plans to reduce carbon emissions per unit of GDP by 40-45 percent compared to 2005 levels, raise the share of non-fossil fuels in primary energy consumption to 15%, and increase forest area and stock volume by 40 million hectares and 1.3 million m3, respectively, compared to 2005 levels.

===== Energy Development Strategy Action Plan (2014-2020) =====
This plan aimed to reduce China's high energy consumption per unit of GDP through a series of steps and mandatory goals, encouraging more productive, self-sufficient, renewable, and creative energy production and consumption.

===== Law on the Prevention and Control of Atmospheric Pollution (2016) =====
The aim of this law is to preserve and improve the environment, prevent and regulate air pollution, protect public health, advance ecological civilization, and promote economic and social growth that is sustainable. It demands that robust emission control initiatives be implemented against the pollution caused by the burning of coal, industrial production, motor vehicles and vessels, dust as well as agricultural activities.

===== 13th Five-Year Plan (2016-2020) =====
The 13th Five Year Plan published the strategy and pathway for China's development during 2016-2020 and set specific environmental and productivity goals. Peak goals for carbon emissions, energy use, and water use were established in the 13th Five Year Plan. It also stated objectives for increasing industry productivity, removing obsolete or overcapacity production facilities, increasing renewable energy production, and improving green infrastructure.

=== Emissions trading ===
The Chinese national carbon trading scheme is an intensity-based trading system for carbon dioxide emissions by China, which started operating in 2021. The Chinese Ministry of Finance originally proposed a carbon tax in 2010, to come into effect in 2012 or 2013. The tax was never passed; in February 2021 the government instead set up an emission trading scheme (ETS) where emitters can buy and sell emission credits.

China is the largest emitter of greenhouse gases (GHG) and many major Chinese cities had severe air pollution through the 2010s, with the situation improving in the 2020s. The scheme is run by the Ministry of Ecology and Environment, which eventually plans to limit emissions from six of China's top carbon dioxide emitting industries. In 2021, it started with its power plants, and covers 40% of China's emissions, which is 15% of world emissions. China was able to gain experience in drafting and implementation of an ETS plan from the United Nations Framework Convention on Climate Change (UNFCCC), where China was part of the Clean Development Mechanism (CDM).

China's national ETS is the largest of its kind, and helps China achieve its Nationally Determined Contribution (NDC) to the Paris Agreement. In July 2021, permits were being handed out for free rather than auctioned, and the market price per tonne of CO_{2}e was around RMB 50, roughly half of the EU ETS and the UK ETS but better compared to the US, which has no formal cap-and-trade program.

The ETS reduced carbon emissions by up to 18.2%. It reduced inequality and improve welfare. Around a third of all health benefits from air pollution reduction, were achieved by the ETS. In some circumstances it reduced GDP and innovation. The system reduced emissions from the power sector by 13% during the years 2013-2020. By 2027, it is expected to expand to all major industrial emmiters and began to establish an absolute cap.

China also has a policy of forestry carbon credits. Forestry carbon credits are based on the measurement of forest growth, which is converted into carbon emission reduction measurements by government ecological and forestry offices. Owners of forests (who are typically rural families or rural villages) receive carbon tickets (碳票; tan piao) which are tradeable securities.

=== Vehicles ===
Vehicles account for around 8% of the heat-trapping gases released annually in China.

=== Eco-cities ===
The Chinese government has strategically promoted eco-cities in China as a policy measure for addressing rising greenhouse gas emissions resulting from China's rapid urbanization and industrialization. These projects seek to blend green technologies and sustainable infrastructure to build large, environmentally friendly cities nationwide. The government has launched three programs to incentivize cities to undertake eco-city construction, encouraging hundreds of cities to announce plans for eco-city developments.

=== Energy efficiency ===
Energy efficiency improvements have somewhat offset increases in energy output as China continues to develop. Since 2006, the Chinese government has increased export taxes on energy-inefficient industries, reduced import tariffs on certain non-renewable energy resources, and closed down a number of inefficient power and industrial plants. In 2009, for example, for every two new plants (in terms of energy generation capacity) built, one inefficient plant was closed. China is unique in its closing of so many inefficient plants.

=== Renewable energy ===
2025 saw China's first 12-month decline in carbon dioxide emissions attributable to growth in renewable energy. The 2016 decline is attributable to a slump after stimulus measures, and 2022's decline is attributable to zero-Covid controls.

China is the world's leading investor in wind turbines and other renewable energy technologies and produces more wind turbines and solar panels each year than any other country.

China is the world leader in renewable energy deployment, with more than twice the ability of any other nation. China accounted for 43% of global renewable energy capacity additions in 2018. For decades, hydropower has been a major source of energy in China. In the last ten years, wind and solar power have risen significantly. Renewables accounted for approximately a quarter of China's electricity generation in 2018, with 18% coming from hydropower, 5% from wind, and 3% from solar.

Nuclear power is planned to be rapidly expanded.

China has also dictated energy standards for lighting and gas kilometrage for cars.

China's vast investment in the energy sector has caused falling costs of renewable energy globally, leading to reduced reliance on fossil fuels around the world.

== See also ==
- List of countries by greenhouse gas emissions
