= EU Allowance =

Climate credits used in the EU ETS

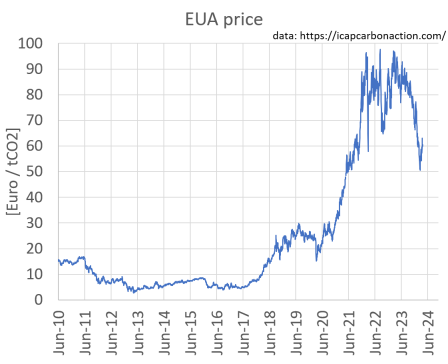
Price of CO_{2} in the EU Emissions Trading System

EU Allowances (EUA) are emission rights (or carbon allowances) used in the European Union Emissions Trading Scheme (EU ETS). EU Allowances are issued by the EU Member States into Member State Registry accounts. By April 30 of each year, operators of installations covered by the EU ETS must surrender an EU Allowance for each tonne (1,000 kg) of CO_{2} emitted in the previous year. The emission allowance is defined in Article 3(a) of the EU ETS Directive as being "an allowance to emit one tonne of carbon dioxide equivalent during a specified period, which shall be valid only for the purposes of meeting the requirements of this Directive and shall be transferable in accordance with the provisions of this Directive".

The EU Allowances are connected to the EUs goal of achieving climate neutrality in the EU by 2050 and a 55% reduction in greenhouse gas emissions by 2030. They are not to be confused with carbon credits issued from voluntary systems.

== Cap and trade system ==
Introduced in 2005, the EU ETS is the first and largest greenhouse gas emissions trading scheme worldwide. It covers approximately 10,000 installations including power generation, various industries, and intra-European aviation, which collectively account for about 40% of the EU's greenhouse gas emissions. This cap-and-trade system sets emission limits to control and reduce greenhouse gases across the EU.

In the EU ETS cap-and trade system, companies receive or buy emission allowances within the cap and they are allowed to trade them with one another. The total number of allowances is limited, which ensures that they have a value. If a company emits more in a year than its allowances, then heavy fines can be imposed. The fine is 100 euros per excess tonne, but the company still needs to surrender EUAs for the uncovered emissions in the subsequent year - so the 100 EUR fine does not present a ceiling price for EUAs. Companies that do not use their allowances can "bank" them to cover future needs or sell them to other companies.

== Free allocation of allowances ==
Free allocation of allowances decreases each year. Over the 2013 to 2020 trading period 43% of allowances were available for free allocation; and the manufacturing industry received 80% of its allowances for free at the beginning of that trading period which decreased gradually to 30% in 2020. On the other hand, power generators in principle do not receive any free allowance but have to buy them (except in some member states like Poland, Bulgaria, Hungary, Lithuania, etc.).

== Auctioning of allowances ==
The default method of allocating allowances, which were not allocated for free within the EU emissions trading system (EU ETS) is auctioning. This is the most transparent allocation method, as it shows that polluters should pay and how much. The auctioning is governed by the EU ETS Auctioning Regulation, which ensures that it is conducted in an open, transparent, harmonized, and non-discriminatory manner. Currently, there are two auctioning platforms:

1. European Energy Exchange (EEX), in Leipzig, is the common auction platform for the large majority of countries participating in the EU ETS and also conducts emissions auctions for Poland during the transitional period. EEX also published the volumes that will be auctioned in 2020.
2. ICE Futures Europe (ICE), which acts as the United Kingdom's platform and is located in London. The first EUAA auction on ICE took place in September 2014.

Auctioning share is increasing from 2013 to 2020. In 2013, over 40% of allowances were auctioned and it is estimated that 57% of the allowances will be auctioned during 2013–2020. The volume of free allowances decreases faster than the cap. what causes more allowances being auctioned. EU ETS Directive foresees that the share of allowances to be auctioned will remain the same after 2020. EU leaders decided in October 2014 that free allocation shall not expire, but the share of allowances being auctioned will not reduce during the next decade.

== Allocation of allowances in phases ==
Allocation of allowances in phases
Phase	Period	Description	Allocation procedure
Phase 1	2005-2007	National allocation plans	auctioning or benchmark-based allocation
Phase 2	2008-2012	~90% of allowances allocated for free	benchmark-based free allocation or auctioning (Germany, UK, Netherlands, Austria, Ireland, Hungary, Czech Republic, Lithuania)
Phase 3	2013-2020	43% allowances allocated for free over whole period	auctioning (57%) or benchmark approach (43%)
Phase 4	2021-2030		benchmark values will be updated twice and adjusted year-on-year due to technological progress, the free allocation may be updated annually, free allocation buffer of over 450 million allowances

In the current fourth phase (2021–2030) of the EU ETS, the emissions cap is being reduced at an accelerated annual rate of 2.2%. Approximately 57% of the allowances are auctioned, with the remainder being distributed for free. Notably, the 'Fit for 55' package proposes further modifications, including plans to increase the reduction rate to 4.2% starting in 2024 and to expedite the decrease in freely allocated allowances.

== Auctioned allowances in 2013-2020 ==
Auctioned allowances in 2013-2020
Year	Estimated amount	Estimated amount after deducting the maximum transitional free allocation for electricity generators	Amount published in the auction calendars or foreseen to be auctioned
2013	1,066,444,135	914,878,081	808,146,500
2014	1,055,457,778	925,952,714	528,399,500
2015	1,043,568,216	929,045,589	632,725,500
2016	1,030,777,152	932,392,360	715,289,500
2017	1,017,062,324	935,935,359	951,195,500
2018	1,002,630,749	939,881,596	937,557,000
2019	987,734,136	945,663,715	945,669,641
2020	972,518,667	972,518,667	972,518,667

== Price volatility ==
The price of carbon is a result of supply and demand and can sometimes be volatile. The demand is linked to emissions in the EU countries, and can vary depending on factors such as temperature (increased heating demand), economic activity, and the amount of renewable energy produced from wind and solar. New investments in lowering emissions is also a factor. In 2020, the EUA prices may be also influenced by Brexit.

The Market Stability Reserve (MSR), which began operating in January 2019, adjusts the supply of allowances available at auction according to the number of allowances in circulation. Allowances are placed in the reserve by reducing auction volumes and released by increasing them. In May 2019, the European Commission announced that the mechanism would reduce auction volumes by approximately 397 million allowances before September 2019 and August 2020.

A scientific study analyzing the effect of the reform found that the substantial price increase could not be explained by the changes to the ETS/MSR alone, but that there also needed to be a change in foresight of market actors: Through the reform, policy makers increased commitment to the EU ETS, making a long-term survival of the EU-ETS more credible. Thus, firms started acting with more foresight, taking expected future certificate scarcity into account. If trust in the long-term stability of the EU-ETS is lost, EUA prices could again strongly decrease.

EUA prices exhibited significant volatility due to geopolitical tensions in early 2022. On 23 February 2022, just before the Russian invasion of Ukraine, EUAs were priced at €95.07 per tonne of CO_{2} equivalent. By 7 March 2022, they had sharply fallen to €58.30, representing a decline of nearly 40%. This marked decrease was primarily attributed to investor reactions, including risk-off sentiments—a strategy in which investors move to safer assets during periods of uncertainty—and the liquidation of positions to meet margin calls in other volatile energy markets. Additionally, speculative activities, anticipating sanctions on Russian entities, contributed to the fluctuations in prices.

== Criticism ==
In November 2021, Czech Prime Minister Andrej Babiš said at the COP26 climate summit in Glasgow that "due to improper legislature and speculation, the price of emission allowances has gone out of control, resulting in the surging costs of electricity."

In August 2022, Polish Prime Minister Mateusz Morawiecki called for a temporary suspension of the EU Emissions Trading System (ETS) to stabilize electricity prices, saying the "price increase [on the ETS] is out of control and hitting the household budgets of EU citizens."

== See also ==
- European Green Deal
- Global energy crisis (2021–2023)
