= ETR =

ETR may refer to:

== Transportation ==
- ElettroTreno, a series of Italian high-speed trains
- Echigo Tokimeki Railway, a railway operating company in Japan
- Santa Rosa International Airport, serving Machala, Ecuador
- Essex Terminal Railway, a short line railroad in Canada

== Other ==
- First East Turkestan Republic
- Second East Turkestan Republic
- Edolo language; ISO language code
- Emissions Trading Registry
- Entergy Corporation; NYSE stock symbol
- Etravirine, a drug used to suppress HIV replication
- Existential theory of the reals, formal language in computer science
- Express Toll Route, in Canada; Ontario Highway 407

== See also ==
- Xetra (trading system); XETR
- Eastern Test Range, a rocket testing area off of Cape Canaveral; ER or AFETR
