= Fuel homogenizer =

Homogenizer for fuel treatment

A fuel homogenizer is a mechanical device used to improve the quality and combustion efficiency of various fuels by reducing particle size and ensuring a uniform mixture. By applying mechanical shear forces, fuel homogenizers break down larger fuel droplets into smaller, more uniform sizes, promoting better atomization during combustion. This process can lead to optimized combustion, reduced sludge formation, lower emissions, and enhanced overall fuel efficiency. Fuel homogenizers are commonly utilized in industries such as maritime shipping, power generation, and petrochemical processing, particularly with heavy fuels like heavy fuel oil (HFO) and marine diesel oil (MDO). They are also increasingly applied to biofuels and fuel blends to prevent degradation and improve stability.

== History ==
Fuel homogenizers were developed in the mid-20th century to address challenges associated with poor fuel quality, particularly in industries that relied on heavy fuel oil (HFO). Early models used mechanical seals to prevent leaks in high-pressure fuel systems and were primarily aimed at breaking down fuel particles and emulsifying water to improve combustion efficiency. Over time, technological advancements led to the introduction of magnetic couplings, which offered reduced wear, lower maintenance, and increased reliability compared to mechanical seals. The adoption of fuel homogenizers became more widespread as environmental regulations, such as MARPOL Annex VI, required industries to reduce emissions. Modern fuel homogenizers are now widely used to improve fuel quality and stability across a range of fuels, including biofuels and fuel blends, in industries such as maritime shipping and power generation.

== Overview ==
Fuel homogenizers operate by applying mechanical shear forces to fuel, typically through a rotor-stator mechanism. This process reduces the size of larger fuel droplets, enhancing fuel atomization during injection in combustion engines. Improved atomization leads to more efficient combustion, less unburnt residue, and reduced emissions of nitrogen oxides (NO_{x}), particulate matter (PM), and carbon dioxide (CO_{2}).

== Installation and benefits ==
The benefits of fuel homogenizers vary depending on their placement within the fuel system:

- Sludge reduction: When installed before fuel separators, fuel homogenizers can reduce sludge production by breaking down larger asphaltene clusters. This allows separators to remove impurities more efficiently. Studies have indicated that sludge reduction of up to 50–80% can be achieved with the use of homogenizers.
- Combustion improvement: Installing homogenizers within the booster module, just before the automatic filter, enhances fuel atomization and combustion efficiency. This placement can lead to lower particulate emissions, reduced fuel consumption, and decreased CO_{2} emissions.

Fuel homogenizers are also utilized to prevent fuel degradation when installed over fuel tanks. This application is particularly beneficial for biofuels, blends, and low-quality fuels, as the homogenizer helps maintain fuel stability by preventing stratification and ensuring consistent fuel flow.

== Technology and functionality ==
The core technology of fuel homogenizers involves the application of mechanical shear forces to reduce fuel particle sizes to between 3 and 5 micron. This is typically achieved using a rotor-stator mechanism that subjects the fuel to intense shear forces, breaking down larger particles and clusters.

This process not only improves fuel atomization during combustion but also reduces the formation of sludge and carbon deposits within the engine. Additionally, homogenization can enhance water-in-fuel emulsions, where small amounts of water are mixed with fuel to lower combustion temperatures, thereby reducing NO_{x} emissions.

== Water-fuel emulsions ==
Water-fuel emulsions (WFE) are created by mixing water into the fuel to form a stable emulsion. This method is beneficial for reducing harmful emissions and improving combustion efficiency. The evaporation of water during combustion causes micro-explosions that further break down fuel droplets, resulting in finer atomization and more complete combustion.

== Applications ==
Fuel homogenizers are employed in several industries:

- Maritime shipping: In the maritime industry, homogenizers reduce sludge formation, improve engine efficiency, and assist vessels in complying with international emissions regulations such as MARPOL Annex VI. The reduction of CO_{2} emissions through fuel savings is increasingly important due to regulations like the EU Emissions Trading System (EU ETS) and the FuelEU Maritime initiative, which aim to reduce greenhouse gas emissions from the maritime sector.
- Power generation: Power plants that utilize heavy fuels benefit from improved fuel atomization and sludge reduction when using homogenizers, leading to enhanced combustion efficiency and reduced emissions.
- Biofuels and blends: Homogenizers are critical in stabilizing biofuels and fuel blends, ensuring smooth engine operation and consistent fuel quality.

== Environmental and economic benefits ==
The use of fuel homogenizers offers both environmental and economic advantages:

- Reduction in emissions: By improving fuel atomization and combustion efficiency, homogenizers contribute to lower emissions of NO_{x}, particulate matter, and carbon dioxide (CO_{2}). Improved combustion efficiency results in reduced fuel consumption, leading to lower CO_{2} emissions per unit of energy produced.
- Compliance with emission regulations: The reduction in CO_{2} emissions is significant in the context of emission trading systems such as the European Union Emissions Trading System (EU ETS). Under the EU ETS and the upcoming FuelEU Maritime regulation, maritime operators are required to monitor, report, and reduce their greenhouse gas emissions. Fuel homogenizers can assist in achieving compliance by lowering CO_{2} emissions through improved fuel efficiency.
- Cost savings: Reduced sludge formation and improved combustion efficiency can lower fuel consumption and decrease costs associated with sludge disposal and emission allowances.
- Extended equipment lifespan: Decreased sludge and carbon deposits allow for longer intervals between engine maintenance, reducing operational costs and extending the lifespan of equipment.
