= Chinese national carbon trading scheme =

Intensity based trading system for carbon dioxide emissions by China

The Chinese national carbon trading scheme is an intensity-based trading system for carbon dioxide emissions by China, which started operating in 2021. The Chinese Ministry of Finance originally proposed a carbon tax in 2010, to come into effect in 2012 or 2013. The tax was never passed; in February 2021 the government instead set up an emission trading scheme (ETS) where emitters can buy and sell emission credits.

China is the largest emitter of greenhouse gases (GHG) and many major Chinese cities had severe air pollution through the 2010s, with the situation improving in the 2020s. The scheme is run by the Ministry of Ecology and Environment, which eventually plans to limit emissions from six of China's top carbon dioxide emitting industries. In 2021, it started with its power plants, and covers 40% of China's emissions, which is 15% of world emissions. China was able to gain experience in drafting and implementation of an ETS plan from the United Nations Framework Convention on Climate Change (UNFCCC), where China was part of the Clean Development Mechanism (CDM).

China's national ETS is the largest of its kind, and helps China achieve its Nationally Determined Contribution (NDC) to the Paris Agreement. In July 2021, permits were being handed out for free rather than auctioned, and the market price per tonne of CO_{2}e was around RMB 50, roughly half of the EU ETS and the UK ETS but better compared to the US, which has no formal cap-and-trade program.

The ETS reduced carbon emissions by up to 18.2%. It reduced inequality and improve welfare. Around a third of all health benefits from air pollution reduction, were achieved by the ETS. In some circumstances it reduced GDP and innovation. The system reduced emissions from the power sector by 13% during the years 2013-2020. By 2027, it is expected to expand to all major industrial emmiters and began to establish an absolute cap.

== Plan specifics ==
China promised in the Conference of Parties to reduce their carbon intensity per unit of GDP by 60–65% by 2030. To achieve this, they decided to use market-based mechanisms. They developed the Clean Development Mechanism, which consists of a "bottom up" architecture. China has learned from the European Union, whose carbon trading market is currently twice as big, along with California in the United States, to implement mechanisms such as cap and trade. The goal is to create an international market through exchanges where allowances are traded and carbon emissions are monitored and reported.

In the 2010s, China implemented seven pilot carbon markets in various zones that thrive on production of cement, electricity, heat, petroleum and oil extraction. These zones are: Beijing, Chongqing, Guangdong, Hubei, Shanghai, Shenzhen and Tianjin, which represent 25% of China's total GDP. These stationary activities are known to be the most polluting and largest emitters of GHG. In 2016, it was estimated that 40.24 million metric tons of carbon dioxide have been traded.

These pilot zones proved the cap and trade model's efficiency. Cap refers to a permitted amount of emissions. If an industry exceeds the cap, it requires an allowance. Allowances can be traded, auctioned, or even given away for free. Through cap and trade, it is believed that both competitiveness and possibly carbon leakage will be reduced. Each cap and allowance was assigned to the cities according to their purpose, production rates, or ability to pass along the costs of carbon along the consumer chain. The caps of greenhouse gas emissions vary from 30 to 350 metric tons of carbon dioxide equivalent per year when the price for carbon varies from US$1.4 to US$13.00 per ton of carbon dioxide. There also are two types of allowances: new entry vs. governmental. The new entry allowances are for those who are in need for growth and are freely distributed, whereas the governmental allowance is a fixed, stable fraction that must be sold or auctioned.

There are also conditions that each zone must uphold, mainly regarding monitoring, reporting and verification. Each zone has their own mechanism of doing so, but they all face the same kind of penalties if failing to do so. These penalties include: a reduction of free allowances, a threat to publicizing said status in order to create social pressure, a two-year restricted access to special funds for energy research and if an excess of emission were to take place, the zone's government or company would have to pay three times the original allowance price.

Chinese leader Xi Jinping publicly announced China's intention to develop a national carbon emissions trading system during a 2015 visit to the United States White House. China's Thirteenth Five-Year Plan (covering 2016–2020) required that the government develop regulations for the national system. In December 2017, China's National Development and Reform Commission (NDRC) announced the creation of the system.

== Difficulties ==
There are challenges to China achieving these goals. The country will have to ensure that there will not be any overlap with already existing policies on prevention, reduction and consumption of pollutants. The country will also have to strictly monitor and enforce the scheme, and make sure that there is end to end transparency. There will also need to be special attention to carbon leakage and on price volatility. Since the pilot cities began this project, the price of carbon and caps has fluctuated. The government will also need to make sure that there is an efficient trade and exchange of allowances on the spot market. There will also need to be an plan to reduce greenhouse gas emissions to achieve their Paris Agreement.

On the other hand, policy makers face a struggle to allocate allowances. For the free allowance, they need to think about whom to give them to. for the auctioned ones, they need to think about the type of auction that is most convenient, and for the combined ones, all of the above.

== Influences ==
An overview of studies related to the impacts of the ETS found that it "generates clear environmental and social benefits but exhibits mixed economic and innovation effects." From the environmental perspective, the system reduce carbon emissions by up to 18.2%, reducing pollution also. Considering social effects, the system reduce inequality and improve welfare. 33% of all health benefits from air pollution control policies in China are the benefits from the ETS, if adding the impact on carbon emission the health benefits are even bigger. Some researchers found it can reduce GDP or inhibit innovation. The system reduced emissions from the power sector in China by 13% during the years 2013-2020, mainly through reduced generation of electricity. Allowance shortages and high carbon prices had the biggest impact.

Prior to the conception and design of China's national carbon trading scheme, carbon emission trading (CET) had never been done in China. With no CET experience to draw from, in late 2011 the National Development and Reform Commission (NDRC) approved two provinces and five cities of varying degrees of economic development as pilots. In the Notice on Launching Pilots for Emissions Trading System (ETS), the NDRC approved Beijing, Tianjin, Shanghai, Chongqing, Hubei, Guangdong, and Shenzhen as ETS pilots. Shenzhen was the first pilot to launch, on June 18, 2013, and was soon followed by the other designated pilots, which all completed their first compliance period by June 2015. All of the pilots with compliance data had compliance rates of over 96%, with Shanghai having the highest compliance rate at 100% and Tianjin having the lowest compliance rate at 96.5%. In order to aid the design of implementation details in China's national carbon trading scheme, each of the pilots was given the freedom to decide values for trading scheme parameters such as allowance allocation, coverage of sectors, and punishment mechanisms. They also vary in their approach to transactions, issues with price uncertainty, and managing risk. To assess the success of one pilot's trading scheme versus another, market performance was considered.

The pilots' approach to allowance allocation were largely based on historical emissions for most sectors except the power sector, which was allocated an allowance based on benchmarks and production. Guangdong was the only pilot to implement auctioning allowances for its power sector. Additionally, all pilots except Hubei allowed allowance rollover into the next compliance period. To standardize monitoring, reporting, and verification of carbon data, the NDRC issued monitoring and reporting regulations. Enterprises were required to monitor and report their emissions, which was compared to a report from a third-party verification agency. Discrepancies in the reports above a threshold would require a re-verification. For most pilots, this threshold was set at a difference of 10% or 100 thousand tons. Funding required for verification was supplied by the local government rather than the enterprise, in order to reduce the compliance burden.

Five of the pilot programs allowed individuals to participate in carbon trading while two only allowed enterprises to do so. Transaction formats varied slightly but were all in spot markets with no carbon futures. In all pilots, enterprises needed to pay the cost of trading, which was a two-way charging scheme. In order to ensure stability in the carbon market, each pilot set a price limit based on the closing price of carbon in the previous compliance period, as well as limits on maximum allowance holdings for enterprises. Each pilot implemented varying degrees of fines for faking carbon data or withholding data. Shenzhen was the only pilot to implement a variable fine, setting it as three times the market clearing price times the excess emissions. Other pilot programs charged a flat fee. All pilots deducted the excess emissions from the next period's allowance for the enterprise in question.

From the pilot program's inception to May 2015, 20.27 MtCO_{2}e had been traded for a total value of 720 million CNY. The carbon price for Shenzhen and Guangdong were the greatest, ranging from 60 to 80 CNY. The price fluctuated more in Shenzhen and Tianjin when compared to other pilots, especially near the compliance period deadline and near the beginning of new periods. The transitive behavior of the carbon market is a result more so of trading entities' understanding of policy and the timing of carbon data acquisition rather than market demand. From the pilot program data, China should improve on the designs of the pilot programs in order to achieve a stable and stimulated national carbon market.

China also has a policy of forestry carbon credits. Forestry carbon credits are based on the measurement of forest growth, which is converted into carbon emission reduction measurements by government ecological and forestry offices. Owners of forests (who are typically rural families or rural villages) receive carbon tickets (碳票; tan piao) which are tradeable securities.

== Economic analysis ==
The scheme set the initial carbon allowances to 3–5 billion tonnes per year. Comparing this to the EU-ETS scheme, it is almost twice as much as the EU allowance. By the time of July 2016, EU-ETS is the world's largest carbon trading system, with a carbon market of two billion tonnes per year. The National Development and Reform Commission (NDRC) announced that eight sectors would be included in this market, these eight sectors are petrochemicals, chemicals, building materials, steel, ferrous metals, paper-making, power-generation and aviation. The companies that participate in this market are compulsory to use more designated amount of energy. The current number is 10,000 tonnes of standard coal equivalent of energy per year. According to seven pilot cities (7 trial carbon market in China) average price, the launch price would be set to be around 5 dollars per ton, which would generate a revenue of $0.17 to $1.16 billion in the first trading year. The expected carbon trading volume would increase to $7–58 billion per year after 2020 since more market would be introduced to the carbon trading system.

The first auction for vintage 2016 allowances happened in Guangdong on September 21. This was held by the China Emission Exchange of Guangdong. The settlement price was $1.48 per ton, exceeding the set floor price (reserve) of $1.40 per ton for the 500,000 tonnes auctioned. In the future, China's carbon trading allowance would expect to be increase to 3–5 billion tonnes of CO_{2}, which would bring a revenue of around 60–400 billion CNY.

== Expansion and transition to absolute cap ==
By 2027, the ETS is expected to cover all major industrial emmiters and for the sectors with stable emissions it will establish an absolute cap - instead of capping carbon intensity the system will cap emissions.

== See also ==
- Clean Development Mechanism (CDM), United Nations
- Personal carbon trading
- Politics of global warming
