= Emissions Trading Registry =

An Emissions Trading Registry (ETR) is a web-based application that records:

- CO_{2} allowances and units allocated to and held in operator, person and Government accounts
- The movement of allowances and units between accounts (including allocations, transfers, surrender and cancellations)
- Annual verified emissions of installations
- Annual compliance status of installations.

An account holder can therefore hold, transfer, cancel or acquire EU Allowances (EUAs) and Kyoto units (e.g. CERs, ERUs, AAUs, RMUs, tCERs and lCERs). Further details regarding each of these unit types can be found in A Guide to Using Kyoto Units in the European Union Emissions Trading Scheme, available on the Environment Agency's website. In addition, regulators and nominated competent authorities can manage regulated industries (those with legal emissions reduction targets), and monitor national compliance and performance against international emissions reductions obligations.

Computerised registries are key components of the EU Emissions Trading System (EU ETS) and wider international emissions trading under the United Nations Framework Convention on Climate Change's (UNFCCC's) Kyoto Protocol. Under Directive 2003/87/EC, EU Member States were required to put in place a standardised, electronic national registry from 2005, whilst Parties to the Kyoto Protocol were required to put in place a national registry to allow international emissions trading from 2008. The functional requirements of the Registry are determined by the European Commission (through the Registry Regulations) and the UNFCCC secretariat (through various COP / MOP decisions).

All national registries are connected directly to the UNFCCC’s International Transaction Log (ITL). This transaction log is responsible for checking all transactions to ensure they adhere to the rules of international emissions trading under the Kyoto Protocol. The ITL also has a link to the EC's Community Independent Transaction Log (CITL). This transaction log is responsible for checking all transactions to ensure that they adhere to the rules of the EU ETS.
