= Carbon emission trading =

Approach to limit climate change

Allowance prices for carbon emission trade in all major emission trading schemes in Euro per ton of CO_{2} emitted (from 2008 until August 2024).

Carbon emission trading (also called carbon market, emission trading scheme (ETS) or cap and trade) is a type of emissions trading scheme designed for carbon dioxide (CO_{2}) and other greenhouse gases (GHGs). A form of carbon pricing, its purpose is to limit climate change by creating a market with limited allowances for emissions. Carbon emissions trading is a common method that countries use to attempt to meet their pledges under the Paris Agreement, with schemes operational in China, the European Union, and other countries.

Emissions trading sets a quantitative total limit on the emissions produced by all participating emitters, which correspondingly determines the prices of emissions. Under emission trading, a polluter having more emissions than their quota has to purchase the right to emit more from emitters with fewer emissions. This can reduce the competitiveness of fossil fuels, which are the main driver of climate change. Instead, carbon emissions trading may accelerate investments into renewable energy, such as wind power and solar power.

However, such schemes are usually not harmonized with defined carbon budgets that are required to maintain global warming below the critical thresholds of 1.5 °C or "well below" 2 °C, with oversupply leading to low prices of allowances with almost no effect on fossil fuel combustion. Emission trade allowances currently cover a wide price range from €7 per tonne of CO_{2} in China's national carbon trading scheme to €63 per tonne of CO_{2} in the EU-ETS (as of September 2021).

Other greenhouse gases can also be traded but are quoted as standard multiples of carbon dioxide with respect to their global warming potential.

An international coalition to create a global carbon market, including a global, gradually declining, cap on emissions began to form in COP30. It can speed up emissions reduction seven-fold in all participating countries, while delivering $200 billion per year for clean-energy and social programs.

== Purpose ==
The economic problem with climate change is that the emitters of greenhouse gases (GHGs) do not face the external costs of their actions, which include the present and future welfare of people, the natural environment, and the social cost of carbon. This can be addressed with the dynamic price model of emissions trading.

An emissions trading scheme for greenhouse gas emissions (GHGs) works by establishing property rights for the atmosphere. The atmosphere is a global public good, and GHG emissions are an international externality. In the cap-and-trade variant of emissions trading, a cap on access to a resource is defined and then allocated among users in the form of permits. Compliance is established by comparing actual emissions with permits surrendered. The setting of the cap affects the environmental integrity of carbon trading, and can result in both positive and negative environmental effects.

Emissions trading programmes such as the European Union Emissions Trading System (EU-ETS) complement the country-to-country trading stipulated in the Kyoto Protocol by allowing private trading of permits, coordinating with national emissions targets provided under the Kyoto Protocol. Under such programmes, a national or international authority allocates permits to individual companies based on established criteria, with a view to meeting targets at the lowest overall economic cost.

== History ==
"Economy-wide pricing of carbon is the centre piece of any policy designed to reduce emissions at the lowest possible costs".

— Ross Garnaut, lead author of the Garnaut Climate Change Review in 2011

Carbon emission trading began in Rio de Janeiro in 1992, when 160 countries agreed the UN Framework Convention on Climate Change (UNFCCC). The necessary detail was left to be settled by the UN Conference of Parties (COP).

In 1997, the Kyoto Protocol was the first major agreement to reduce greenhouse gases. 38 developed countries committed themselves to targets and timetables. The resulting inflexible limitations on GHG growth could entail substantial costs if countries have to solely rely on their own domestic measures.

Carbon emissions trading increased rapidly in 2021 with the start of the Chinese national carbon trading scheme. The increasing costs of permits on the EU ETS have had the effect of increasing costs of coal power.

A 2019 study by the American Council for an Energy Efficient Economy finds that efforts to put a price on greenhouse gas emissions are growing in North America. In 2021, shipowners said they were against being included in the EU ETS.

=== Global Carbon Market Statistics ===
The global carbon market has experienced significant growth in recent years. In 2023, the value of the global carbon market reached a record high of 881 billion euros (approximately $949 billion), representing a 2% increase from the previous year. The European Union Emissions Trading System (EU ETS) remains the largest carbon market based on value, accounting for approximately 87% of the global market size in 2023.

In terms of trading volume, approximately 12.5 billion metric tons of carbon dioxide (GtCO_{2}) were traded in global carbon markets in 2022, which represented a decline of over 20% from the previous year but still an 18.2% increase compared to 2019 levels. Europe dominated the carbon trading volume, accounting for roughly 74% of the traded volume of CO_{2} worldwide in 2022.

== Economic aspects and tools ==
Economists generally agree that to regulate emissions efficiently, all polluters need to face the full marginal social costs of their actions. Regulation of emissions applied only to one economic sector or region drastically reduces the efficiency of efforts to reduce global emissions. There is, however, no scientific consensus over how to share the costs and benefits of reducing future climate change, or the costs and benefits of adapting to any future climate change.

=== Carbon offsets and credits ===
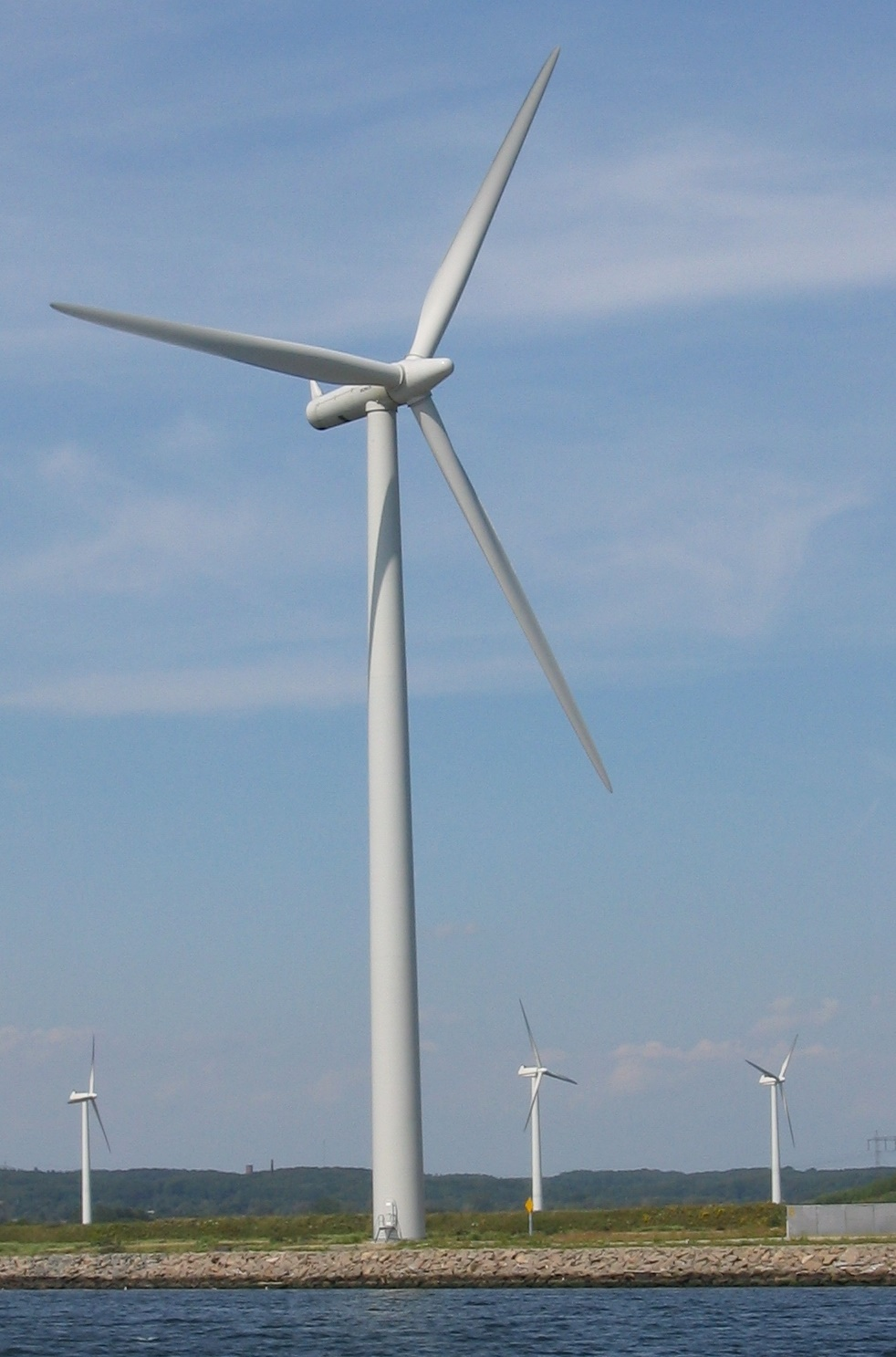
Renewable energy projects, such as these wind turbines near Aalborg, Denmark, constitute one common type of carbon offset project.

A carbon credit is a tradable instrument (typically a virtual certificate) that conveys a claim to have avoided greenhouse gas (GHG) emissions or to have enhanced removal of GHG from the atmosphere. One carbon credit represents the avoided or enhanced removal of one metric ton of carbon dioxide or its carbon dioxide-equivalent (CO_{2}e).

Carbon offsetting is the practice of using carbon credits to offset or counter an entity's greenhouse gas inventory emissions in line with reporting programs or institutional emissions targets/goals. Carbon credit trading mechanisms (i.e., crediting programs), enable project developers to implement projects that mitigate GHGs and receive carbon credits which can be sold to interested buyers who may use the credits to claim they have offset their inventory GHG emissions. Similar to "offsetting", carbon credits that are permitted as compliance instruments within regulatory compliance markets (e.g., The European Union Emission Trading Scheme or the California Cap-n-Trade program) can be used by regulated entities to report lower emissions and achieve compliance status (with limitations around their use that vary by compliance program). Aside from "offsetting", carbon credits can also be used to make contributions toward global net zero GHG-level targets. It is an individual buyer's choice how to use, or "retire", the carbon credit.

Projects entail mitigation actions that avoid or enhance the removal of GHG emissions. Projects are implemented in line with the standards of crediting programs, including their methodologies, rules, and requirements. Methodologies are approved for each specific project type (e.g., tree planting, mangrove restoration, early retirement of coal powerplants). Provided a project fulfills all of the requirements and provisions of a crediting program, it will be issued credits that can be sold to buyers. Each crediting program typically has its own carbon credit 'label' such as CDM's Certified Emission Reductions (CERs), Article 6.4 Mechanism Emission Reductions (A6.4ERs), VCS' Verified Emission Reductions (VERs), ACR's Emission Reduction Tonnes, Climate Action Reserves' Climate Reserve Tonnes (CRTs), etc.

Hundreds of GHG mitigation project types exist and have approved methodologies with established crediting programs. But each crediting program has its own list of approved methodologies, for example unless explicitly stated, an ACR approved methodology could not be used by someone trying to work through Verra's Verified Carbon Standard. Carbon credits are a form of carbon pricing, along with carbon taxes, and Carbon Border Adjustment Mechanisms (CBAM). Carbon credits are intended to be fungible across different markets, but some compliance markets and reporting programs limit eligibility to specified carbon credit types or characteristics (e.g., vintage, project origin, project type).

=== Carbon leakage ===
A domestic carbon emissions trading scheme is constrained in its regulatory jurisdiction. GHG emissions may thus leak to another region or sector with less regulation. Generally, leakages reduce the effectiveness of domestic emission abatement efforts. Notwithstanding, leakages may also be negative in nature, increasing the effectiveness of domestic abatement efforts. For example, a carbon tax applied only to developed countries might lead to a positive leakage to developing countries. However, a negative leakage might also occur due to technological developments driven by domestic regulation of GHGs, helping to reduce emissions even in less regulated regions.

The current state of carbon emissions trading shows that roughly 22% of global greenhouse emissions are covered by 64 carbon taxes and emission trading systems as of 2021. Energy intensive industries that are covered by such instruments may view the regulatory disparity between jurisdictions as a loss of competitiveness. They may therefore make strategic production decisions that involve carbon leakage. To mitigate carbon leakage and its effects on the environment, policymakers need to harmonize international climate policies and provide incentives to prevent companies from relocating production to regions with more lenient environmental regulations.

Free emission permits, given to sectors vulnerable to international competition, are one way of addressing carbon leakage by acting as a subsidy for the sector in question. The Garnaut Climate Change Review considered the free allocation of permits unjustified in any circumstances, arguing that governments could deal with market failure or claims for compensation more transparently with the revenue from full auctioning of permits.

=== Border Adjustment ===
Another economically efficient solution to carbon leakage is border adjustment, where tariffs are set on imported goods from less regulated countries. A problem with border adjustments is that they might be used as a disguise for trade protectionism. Some types of border adjustment may also not prevent emissions leakage. The EU Carbon Border Adjustment Mechanism takes in effect for 6 sectors in 2026.

A study examining the potential effects of the European Union's Carbon Border Adjustment Mechanism (CBAM) suggests that the regulation may impose additional costs on EU companies. The analysis focused on publicly listed firms operating in CBAM-covered sectors across 75 countries and assessed stock market reactions at three key stages of the EU legislative process. The findings indicate that, around the relevant announcement dates, EU-based firms experienced larger declines in share prices than non-EU firms in the same sectors, with differences in returns ranging between 2 and 3 percentage points.

The study finds heterogeneity among EU firms. Companies with a greater reliance on suppliers located outside the EU showed more pronounced negative market reactions than those with fewer non-EU suppliers. In addition, the adverse response was concentrated among firms with relatively low profit margins, often used as an indicator of limited market power. The results suggest that some EU firms may face higher import costs either because of their dependence on non-EU suppliers or because limited pricing power constrains their ability to pass on carbon-related costs to foreign exporters subject to the CBAM.

=== Relevance to climate justice ===
Carbon trading can be helpful to achieve climate justice. It can transfer money from rich countries, which tend to have higher emissions, to countries with lower incomes and lower emissions for improved climate action.

Cap-and-trade systems have also been linked to causing environmental injustice as low-income communities receive less benefits from reduced emissions and are often located near the emitters. Companies under emission trading systems will often emit more pollutants not covered by the system and disproportionately affect low-income communities. . In the United States for example, low-income and black residents are 15.3% and 23.5% more likely to live near power lines compared to high-income and white residents. Since carbon trading regimes only limit greenhouse gases, factories can buy emissions permits to meet climate goals without needing to limit their actual air pollutant emittance. As a result, nearby low-income and minority communities continue to face an exposure gap.

=== Potential global carbon market ===
The Paris Agreement provided a legal base for the creation of a global carbon market, which has a potentially significant role in stopping climate change. In the beginning of 2024, the idea made some progress with the Bonn meeting where new tools and supervisory bodies were created.

The rules of the European Union Emissions Trading System include the possibility of connecting it with other trading systems. This has already happened with the Switzerland emissions trading system. China expressed a support for a global carbon market, saying it is better than the EU Carbon Border Adjustment Mechanism.

In 2023 the global value of carbon markets was $948.75 billion. It is expected to reach 2.68 trillion dollars by 2028 and 22 trillion by 2050.

Merging the ETC of China and the EU can be something that sends "a powerful signal to the rest of the world and catalyzes international buy-in" while strongly increasing the efficiency of the system and allowing both countries to attain higher results with less spending.

A global carbon market can speed up emissions reduction seven-fold in all participating countries, while delivering $200 billion per year for clean-energy and social programs. An international coalition for creating it called Open Coalition on Compliance Carbon Markets began to form in COP 30. The plan is to create a global emissions cap beginning with a level close to current emissions rate, and then reducing it until reaching net-zero by 2050. For any activity which causes emissions, people would buy allowances. As the cap decreases, the cost of the allowances will increase, creating an incentive for decarbonization. There will be a border adjustment mechanism governed by all participants. Poorer countries can not pay or pay less and part of the revenue will be spent on helping them address the climate crisis. The formal launch of the Coalition is expected during 2026.

In voluntary carbon markets, the Integrity Council for the Voluntary Carbon Market publishes the Core Carbon Principles (CCPs) and related guidance intended to define high-level integrity criteria for carbon credits.

== Allocation of permits ==
Tradable emissions permits can be issued to firms within an ETS by two main ways: by free allocation of permits to existing emitters or by auction. In the first case, the government receives no carbon revenue. In the second it receives the full value of the permits, on average. In either case, permits will be equally scarce and just as valuable to market participants, such that the price at sale will be the same in either case.

Generally, emitters will profit from permits allocated to them for free. But if they must pay, their profits will be reduced. If the carbon price equals the true social cost of carbon, then long-run profit reduction will reflect the consequences of paying this new cost. If having to pay this cost is unexpected, then there will likely be a one-time loss due to the change in regulations and not simply due to paying the real cost of carbon. However, if there is advanced notice of this change, or if the carbon price is introduced gradually, this one-time regulatory cost will be minimized. There has now been enough advance notice of carbon pricing that this effect should be negligible on average.

=== Grandfathering ===
Allocating permits based on past emissions is called "grandfathering". Grandfathering permits can lead to perverse incentives, such as a firm being given fewer permits in the future for aiming to cut emissions drastically. Another method of grandfathering is to base allocations on current production of economic goods rather than historical emissions. Under this method of allocation, the government will set a benchmark level of emissions for each good deemed to be sufficiently trade exposed and allocate firms units based on their production of this good. However, allocating permits in proportion to output implicitly subsidises production.

The Garnaut Climate Change Review noted that grandfathered permits are not free of cost. As the permits are scarce, they have value, and the benefit of that value is acquired in full by the emitter. The cost is imposed elsewhere in the economy, typically on consumers who cannot pass on the costs: The cost of a grandfathered permit may be regarded as the opportunity cost of not selling the permit at full value. As a result, profit-maximising firms receiving free permits will raise prices to customers because of the new, non-zero cost of emissions. This gives permit-liable polluters an incentive to reduce their emissions. However, if a firm sells the same amount of output as before that cap, with no change in production technology, the full value of permits received for free becomes windfall profits. However, since the cap reduces output and often causes the company to incur costs to increase efficiency, windfall profits will be less than the full value of its free permits.

Grandfathering may also slow down technological development towards less polluting technologies. The Garnaut Report noted that any method for free permit allocation will have the disadvantages of high complexity, high transaction costs, value-based judgements, and the use of arbitrary emissions baselines. Garnaut also noted that the complexity of free allocation and the large amounts of money involved encourage non-productive rent-seeking behaviour and lobbying of governments — activities that dissipate economic value.

At the same time, allocating permits can be used as a measure to protect domestic firms who are internationally exposed to competition. This happens when domestic firms compete against other firms that are not subject to the same regulation. This argument in favor of allocation of permits has been used in the EU ETS, where industries that have been judged to be internationally exposed have been given permits for free.

The International Air Transport Association, whose 230 member airlines comprise 93% of all international traffic, argue that emissions levels should be based on industry averages rather than using individual companies' previous emissions levels to set their future permit allowances, stating that "would penalise airlines that took early action to modernise their fleets, while a benchmarking approach, if designed properly, would reward more efficient operations".

=== Auctioning ===
Hepburn et al. state that, empirically, businesses tend to oppose auctioning of emissions permits, while economists almost uniformly recommend auctioning permits. Auctioning permits provides the government with revenues, which can be used to fund low-carbon investment and cuts in distortionary taxes. Auctioning permits can therefore be more efficient and equitable than allocating permits. Garnaut stated that full auctioning will provide greater transparency and accountability and lower implementation and transaction costs as governments retain control over the permit revenue. Auctions of units are more flexible in distributing costs, provide more incentives for innovation, lessen the political arguments over the allocation of economic rents, and reduce tax distortions. Recycling of revenue from permit auctions could also offset a significant proportion of the economy-wide social costs of a cap and trade scheme.

The perverse incentive of grandfathering can be alleviated through auctioning.

=== Permit supply level ===
Regulatory agencies run the risk of issuing too many emission credits, which can result in a very low price on emission permits. This reduces the incentive that permit-liable firms have to cut back their emissions. On the other hand, issuing too few permits can result in an excessively high permit price. An argument has been made for a hybrid instrument having a price floor and a price ceiling. However, a price-ceiling safety value removes the certainty of a particular quantity limit of emissions.

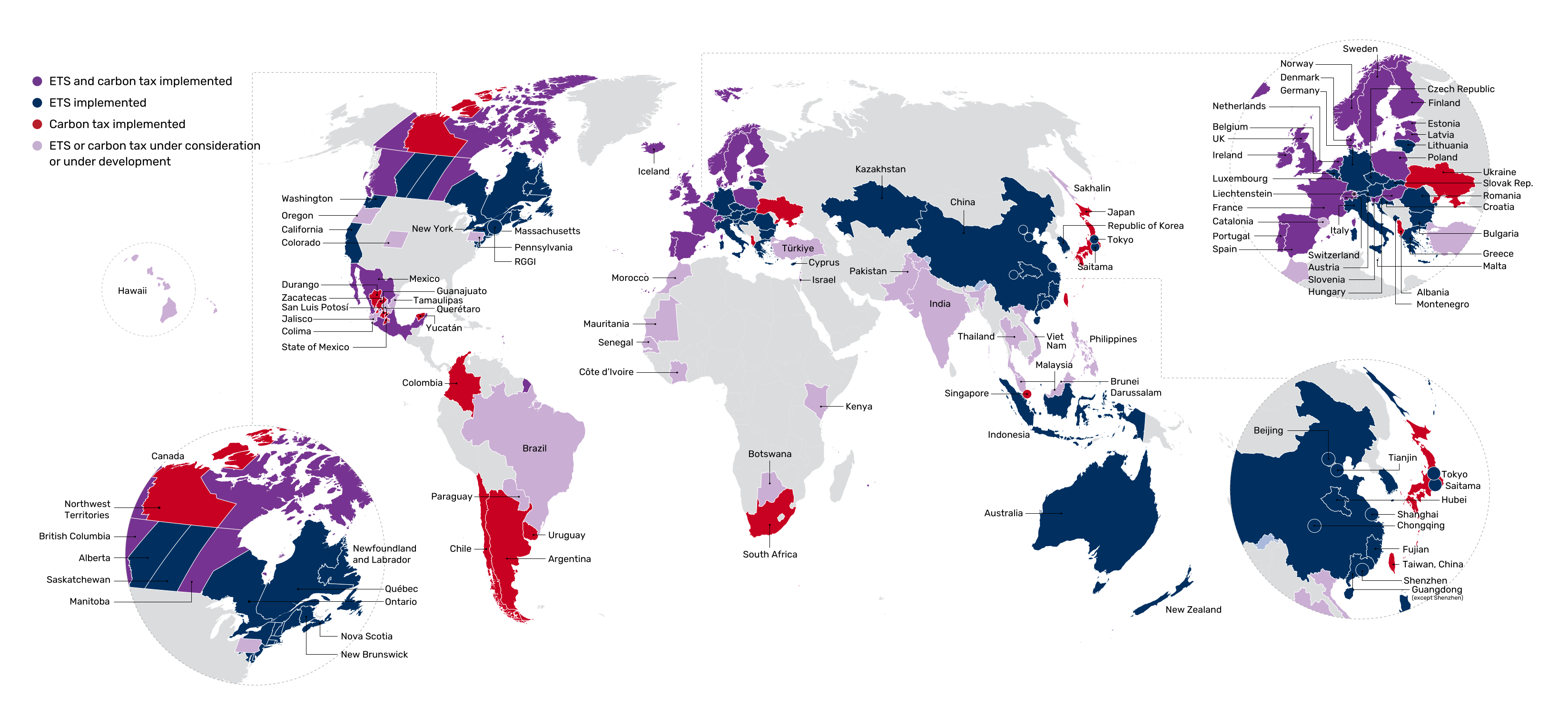
Emissions trading and carbon taxes around the world (2024) ETS and carbon tax implemented ETS implemented Carbon tax implemented ETS or carbon tax under consideration or under development

== Criticisms ==
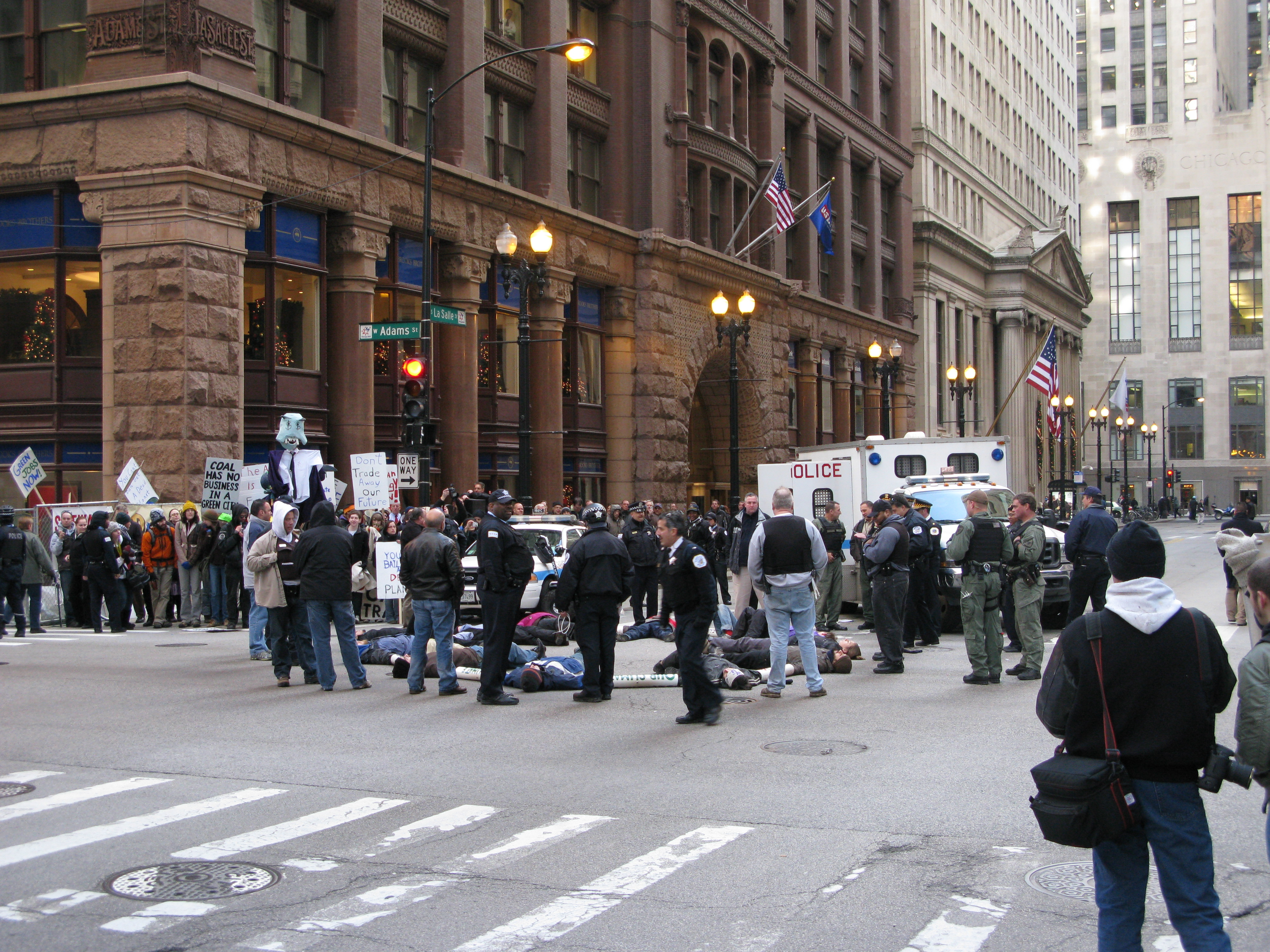
Chicago Climate Justice activists protesting cap and trade legislation in front of Chicago Climate Exchange building in Chicago Loop

Emissions trading has been criticized for a variety of reasons. For one, it has been argued that climate change requires more radical solutions than pollution trading schemes, and that systemic changes must be made to reduce fossil fuel usage. At the same time, carbon credits have been seen as enabling large companies to pollute the environment at the expense of local communities. Carbon trading has also been criticised as a form of colonialism, in which rich countries maintain their levels of consumption while getting credit for carbon savings in inefficient industrial projects.

Groups such as the Corner House have argued that the market will choose the easiest means to save a given quantity of carbon in the short term, which may be different from the means to reduce climate change. In September 2010, campaigning group FERN released "Trading Carbon: How it works and why it is controversial" which compiles many of the arguments against carbon trading. According to Carbon Trade Watch, carbon trading has had a "disastrous track record". The effectiveness of the EU ETS was criticized, and it was argued that the CDM had routinely favoured "environmentally ineffective and socially unjust projects".

Some groups have claimed that non-existent emission reductions can be recorded under the Kyoto Protocol due to the surplus of allowances that some countries possess. For example, Russia had a surplus of allowances due to its economic collapse following the end of the Soviet Union. Other countries could have bought these allowances from Russia, but this would not have reduced emissions. In practice, as of 2010, Kyoto Parties had not yet chosen not to buy these surplus allowances.

The complexity of cap and trade schemes around the world has resulted in the uncertainties around such schemes in Australia, Canada, China, the EU, India, Japan, New Zealand, and the US. As a result, some organizations have had little incentive to innovate and comply, resulting in an ongoing battle of stakeholder contestation for the past two decades.

Proposals for alternative schemes to avoid the problems of cap-and-trade schemes include Cap and Share, which was considered by the Irish Parliament in 2008, and the Sky Trust schemes.

Carbon emission trading without border adjustments for exports leads to reduced global competitiveness for carbon-intensive products.

Some critics in the EU blamed the EU ETS for contributing to the 2021 global energy crisis. In August 2022, Polish Prime Minister Mateusz Morawiecki called for a temporary suspension of the EU ETS to stabilize electricity prices, saying the "price increase [on the ETS] is out of control and hitting the household budgets of EU citizens."

=== Abuses ===
The Financial Times published an article about cap-and-trade systems, which argued that "Carbon markets create a muddle" and "...leave much room for unverifiable manipulation". Emissions trading schemes have also been criticised for the potential of creating a new speculative market through the commodification of environmental risks through financial derivatives.

Annie Leonard's 2009 documentary The Story of Cap and Trade criticized carbon emissions trading for the free permits to major polluters giving them unjust advantages, cheating in connection with carbon offsets, and as a distraction from the search for other solutions.

In China, some companies started artificial production of greenhouse gases with sole purpose of recycling and gaining carbon credits. Similar practices happened in India. Earned credit were then sold to companies in US and Europe.

Corporate and governmental carbon emission trading schemes have been modified in ways that have been attributed to permitting money laundering to take place.

== Examples by country ==
=== Australia ===
In 2003 the New South Wales (NSW) state government unilaterally established the New South Wales Greenhouse Gas Abatement Scheme to reduce emissions by requiring electricity generators and large consumers to purchase NSW Greenhouse Abatement Certificates (NGACs). This has prompted the rollout of free energy-efficient compact fluorescent lightbulbs and other energy-efficiency measures, funded by the credits. This scheme has been criticised by the Centre for Energy and Environmental Markets (CEEM) of the University of New South Wales (UNSW) because of its lack of effectiveness in reducing emissions, its lack of transparency and its lack of verification of the additionality of emission reductions.

Prior to the 2007 federal election, both the incumbent Howard Coalition government and the Rudd Labor opposition promised to implement an emissions trading scheme (ETS). Labor won the election, and the new government proceeded to implement an ETS. The new Rudd government introduced the Carbon Pollution Reduction Scheme, which the Liberal Party of Australia (now led by Malcolm Turnbull) supported. Tony Abbott questioned an ETS, advocating a "simple tax" as the best way to reduce emissions. Shortly before the carbon vote, Abbott defeated Turnbull in a leadership challenge (December 1, 2009), and from there on the Liberals opposed the ETS. This left the Rudd Labor government unable to secure passage of the bill, and it was subsequently withdrawn.

Julia Gillard defeated Rudd in a leadership challenge, becoming Federal Prime Minister in June 2010. She promised that she would not introduce a carbon tax, but would look to legislate a price on carbon when taking the government to the 2010 election. In the first Australian hung-parliament result in 70 years, the Gillard Labor government required the support of crossbenchers - including the Greens. One requirement for Greens' support was a carbon price, which Gillard proceeded with in forming a minority government. A fixed carbon-price would proceed to a floating-price ETS within a few years under the plan. The fixed price lent itself to characterisation as a "carbon tax", and when the government proposed the Clean Energy Bill in February 2011, the opposition denounced it as a broken election promise.

The Lower House passed the bill in October 2011 and the Upper House in November 2011. The Liberal Party vowed to repeal the bill if elected. The bill thus resulted in passage of the Clean Energy Act, which possessed a great deal of flexibility in its design and uncertainty over its future.

The Liberal/National coalition government elected in September 2013 promised to reverse the climate legislation of the previous government. In July 2014, the carbon tax was repealed - as well as the Emissions Trading Scheme (ETS) that was to start in 2015.

=== Canada ===
The Canadian provinces of Quebec and Nova Scotia operate an emissions trading scheme. Quebec links its program with the US state of California through the Western Climate Initiative.

=== China ===
The Chinese national carbon trading scheme is an intensity-based trading system for carbon dioxide emissions by China, which started operating in 2021. The Chinese Ministry of Finance originally proposed a carbon tax in 2010, to come into effect in 2012 or 2013. The tax was never passed; in February 2021 the government instead set up an emission trading scheme (ETS) where emitters can buy and sell emission credits.

China is the largest emitter of greenhouse gases (GHG) and many major Chinese cities had severe air pollution through the 2010s, with the situation improving in the 2020s. The scheme is run by the Ministry of Ecology and Environment, which eventually plans to limit emissions from six of China's top carbon dioxide emitting industries. In 2021, it started with its power plants, and covers 40% of China's emissions, which is 15% of world emissions. China was able to gain experience in drafting and implementation of an ETS plan from the United Nations Framework Convention on Climate Change (UNFCCC), where China was part of the Clean Development Mechanism (CDM).

China's national ETS is the largest of its kind, and helps China achieve its Nationally Determined Contribution (NDC) to the Paris Agreement. In July 2021, permits were being handed out for free rather than auctioned, and the market price per tonne of CO_{2}e was around RMB 50, roughly half of the EU ETS and the UK ETS but better compared to the US, which has no formal cap-and-trade program.

The ETS reduced carbon emissions by up to 18.2%. It reduced inequality and improve welfare. Around a third of all health benefits from air pollution reduction, were achieved by the ETS. In some circumstances it reduced GDP and innovation. The system reduced emissions from the power sector by 13% during the years 2013-2020. By 2027, it is expected to expand to all major industrial emmiters and began to establish an absolute cap.

=== European Union ===
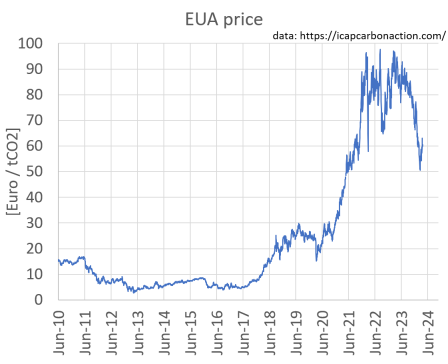
Price of CO_{2} in the EU Emissions Trading System

The European Union Emissions Trading System (EU ETS) is a carbon emission trading scheme (or cap and trade scheme) that began in 2005 and is intended to lower greenhouse gas emissions in the EU. Cap and trade schemes limit emissions of specified pollutants over an area and make polluters pay for their pollution, requiring them to buy allowances to emit enough to cover their emissions, from the EU or from other companies. The money is channeled to environmental and social goals. As of 2026 the ETS covers around 40% of the EU's greenhouse gas emissions. The cap decline gradually and should reach zero by 2039. After this year no more allowances will be distributed and when the unused allowances will end, no more emissions will be permitted.

As from 2027 road transport, buildings and industrial installation that fell out of EU ETS will be covered by a new EU ETS2. The "old" ETS and the new EU ETS2 allowances will be traded independently. A major difference to the ETS is that ETS2 will cover the CO_{2} emissions upstream - fuel suppliers rather than consumers will be obliged to cover emissions with ETS2 emission allowances. The 2 systems will cover 75% of the GHG emissions of the European Union.

Compared to 2005, when the EU ETS was first implemented, the proposed caps for 2020 represent a 21% reduction in greenhouse gases. This target was achieved six years early as emissions in the ETS fell to 1.812 billion (10^{9}) tonnes in 2014.

During the years 2005–2025, GHG emissions in the sectors covered by the ETS declined by around 50%, declining only by 20% in the not covered sectors. A 2020 study showed that between 2008 and 2016 the ETS reduced CO_{2} emissions by 11.5% in covered sectors despite low carbon price. A 2024 study estimate the emission reduction effect at 7%. According to a 2023 study the ETS, reduced emissions by 10% between 2005 and 2012 with no impacts on profits or employment for regulated firms. A 2024 study demonstrated that the ETS has contributed to reduce atmospheric levels of air pollutants in the EU including sulfur dioxide, fine particulate matter, and nitrogen oxide. This reduction has translated in local health co-benefits, alongside the system's primary goal of mitigating climate change. EU countries view the emissions trading scheme as necessary for meeting climate goals. A strong carbon market guides investors and industry in their transition from fossil fuels.

=== India ===
Trading is set to begin in 2014 after a three-year rollout period. It is a mandatory energy efficiency trading scheme covering eight sectors responsible for 54 per cent of India's industrial energy consumption. India has pledged a 20 to 25 per cent reduction in emission intensity from 2005 levels by 2020. Under the scheme, annual efficiency targets will be allocated to firms. Tradable energy-saving permits will be issued depending on the amount of energy saved during a target year.

=== Japan ===
Japan as a country does not have a compulsory emissions trading scheme. The government in 2010 (the Hatoyama cabinet) had planned to introduce one, but the plan lost momentum after Hatoyama resigned as prime minister, due partly from industrial opposition, and was eventually shelved. Japan has a voluntary scheme. Furthermore, the Kyoto Prefecture has a voluntary emissions trading scheme.

Two regional mandatory schemes exist however, in Tokyo and Saitama Prefecture. The city of Tokyo consumes as much energy as "entire countries in Northern Europe, and its production matches the GNP of the world's 16th largest country". A cap-and-trade carbon trading scheme launched in April 2010 covers the top 1,400 emitters in Tokyo, and is enforced and overseen by the Tokyo Metropolitan Government. Phase 1, which was similar to Japan's voluntary scheme, ran until 2015. Emitters had to cut their emissions by 6% or 8% depending on the type of organization; from 2011, those who exceed their limits were required to buy matching allowances, or invest in renewable-energy certificates, or offset credits issued by smaller businesses or branch offices. Polluters that failed to comply were liable up to 500,000 yen in fines plus credits for 1.3 times excess emissions. In its fourth year, emissions were reduced by 23% compared to base-year emissions. In phase 2 (FY2015–FY2019), the target was expected to increase to 15–17%. The aim was to cut Tokyo's carbon emissions by 25% from 2000 levels by 2020.

One year after Tokyo launched its cap-and-trade scheme, the neighbouring Saitama Prefecture launched a highly similar scheme. The two schemes are connected.

=== New Zealand ===
New Zealand Unit Prices

The New Zealand Emissions Trading Scheme (NZ ETS) is an all-gases partial-coverage uncapped domestic emissions trading scheme for emissions of greenhouse gases. It features price floors, forestry offsetting, free allocation and auctioning of emissions units.

The NZ ETS was first legislated in the Climate Change Response (Emissions Trading) Amendment Act 2008 in September 2008 under the Fifth Labour Government of New Zealand and then amended in November 2009 and in November 2012 by the Fifth National Government of New Zealand.

The NZ ETS was until 2015 highly linked to international carbon markets as it allowed unlimited importing of most of the Kyoto Protocol emission units. There is a domestic emission unit; the 'New Zealand Unit' (NZU), which was initially issued by free allocation to emitters until auctions of units commenced in 2020. The NZU is equivalent to 1 tonne of carbon dioxide. Free allocation of units varies between sectors. The commercial fishery sector (who are not participants) received a one-off free allocation of units on a historic basis. Owners of pre-1990 forests received a fixed free allocation of units. Free allocation to emissions-intensive industry, is provided on an output-intensity basis. For this sector, there is no set limit on the number of units that may be allocated. The number of units allocated to eligible emitters is based on the average emissions per unit of output within a defined 'activity'. Bertram and Terry (2010, p 16) state that as the NZ ETS does not 'cap' emissions, the NZ ETS is not a cap and trade scheme as understood in the economics literature.

Some stakeholders have criticised the New Zealand Emissions Trading Scheme for its generous free allocations of emission units and the lack of a carbon price signal (the Parliamentary Commissioner for the Environment), and for being ineffective in reducing emissions (Greenpeace Aotearoa New Zealand).

=== South Korea ===
South Korea's national emissions trading scheme officially launched on January 1, 2015, covering 525 entities from 23 sectors. With a three-year cap of 1.8687 billion tCO_{2}e, it now forms the second-largest carbon market in the world, following the EU ETS. This amounts to roughly two-thirds of the country's emissions. The Korean emissions trading scheme is part of the Republic of Korea's efforts to reduce greenhouse gas emissions by 30% compared to the business-as-usual scenario by 2020.

=== United Kingdom ===
The UK Emissions Trading Scheme (UK ETS) is the carbon emission trading scheme of the United Kingdom. It is cap and trade and came into operation on 1 January 2021 following the UK's departure from the European Union. The cap is reduced in line with the UK's 2050 net zero commitment.

Carbon Price Support (CPS) is an additional tax, paid by electricity generation companies that use fossil fuels, introduced in 2013 in response to the low prices then on the European Union Emissions Trading System.

=== United States ===
The American Clean Energy and Security Act (H.R. 2454), a greenhouse gas cap-and-trade bill, was passed on June 26, 2009, in the House of Representatives by a vote of 219–212. The bill originated in the House Energy and Commerce Committee. It was introduced by Representatives Henry A. Waxman and Edward J. Markey. The political advocacy organizations FreedomWorks and Americans for Prosperity, funded by brothers David and Charles Koch of Koch Industries, encouraged the Tea Party movement to focus on defeating the legislation. Although cap and trade also gained a significant foothold in the Senate via the efforts of Republican Lindsey Graham, Independent and former Democrat Joe Lieberman, and Democrat John Kerry, the legislation died in the Senate.

President Barack Obama's proposed 2010 United States federal budget wanted to support clean energy development with a 10-year investment of US$15 billion per year, generated from the sale of greenhouse gas emissions credits. Under the proposed cap-and-trade program, all GHG emissions credits would have been auctioned off, generating an estimated $78.7 billion in additional revenue in FY 2012, steadily increasing to $83 billion by FY 2019. The proposal was never made law. Failing to get congressional approval for such a scheme, President Barack Obama instead acted through the United States Environmental Protection Agency to attempt to adopt the Clean Power Plan, which does not feature emissions trading. The plan was subsequently challenged by the administration of President Donald Trump.

In 2006, the California State Legislature adopted the California Assembly Bill 32 (AB32), the Global Warming Solutions Act that let to a statewide cap-and-trade program that began in 2012. California and Quebec linked their cap-and-trade programs in 2014, sharing one carbon market.

In 2021, Washington state instituted its own emissions trading system, which it called "Cap-and-Invest." Revenue from the auctioning of carbon allowances is directly invested in programs intended to address climate change.

In the United States, most polling shows large support for emissions trading.

== See also ==
- Business action on climate change
- Carbon tax
- Low-carbon electricity
- Personal carbon trading
