= European Union Emissions Trading System =

First large greenhouse gas emissions trading scheme in the world

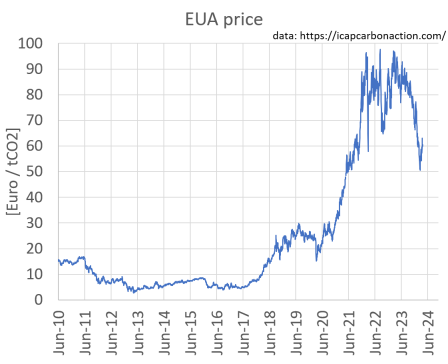
Price of CO_{2} in the EU Emissions Trading System

The European Union Emissions Trading System (EU ETS) is a carbon emission trading scheme (or cap and trade scheme) that began in 2005 and is intended to lower greenhouse gas emissions in the EU. Cap and trade schemes limit emissions of specified pollutants over an area and make polluters pay for their pollution, requiring them to buy allowances to emit enough to cover their emissions, from the EU or from other companies. The money is channeled to environmental and social goals. As of 2026 the ETS covers around 40% of the EU's greenhouse gas emissions. The cap decline gradually and should reach zero by 2039. After this year no more allowances will be distributed and when the unused allowances will end, no more emissions will be permitted.

As from 2027 road transport, buildings and industrial installation that fell out of EU ETS will be covered by a new EU ETS2. The "old" ETS and the new EU ETS2 allowances will be traded independently. A major difference to the ETS is that ETS2 will cover the CO_{2} emissions upstream - fuel suppliers rather than consumers will be obliged to cover emissions with ETS2 emission allowances. The 2 systems will cover 75% of the GHG emissions of the European Union.

Compared to 2005, when the EU ETS was first implemented, the proposed caps for 2020 represent a 21% reduction in greenhouse gases. This target was achieved six years early as emissions in the ETS fell to 1.812 billion (10^{9}) tonnes in 2014.

During the years 2005–2025, GHG emissions in the sectors covered by the ETS declined by around 50%, declining only by 20% in the not covered sectors. A 2020 study showed that between 2008 and 2016 the ETS reduced CO_{2} emissions by 11.5% in covered sectors despite low carbon price. A 2024 study estimate the emission reduction effect at 7%. According to a 2023 study the ETS, reduced emissions by 10% between 2005 and 2012 with no impacts on profits or employment for regulated firms. A 2024 study demonstrated that the ETS has contributed to reduce atmospheric levels of air pollutants in the EU including sulfur dioxide, fine particulate matter, and nitrogen oxide. This reduction has translated in local health co-benefits, alongside the system's primary goal of mitigating climate change. EU countries view the emissions trading scheme as necessary for meeting climate goals. A strong carbon market guides investors and industry in their transition from fossil fuels.

== Setup ==
European allowance prices from 2009

The EU Emission Trading System follows the cap and trade model where one allowance permits the holder to emit 1 ton of CO_{2} (tCO_{2}). Under this scheme, a maximum (cap) is set on the total amount of greenhouse gases that can be emitted by all participating installations. EU Allowances for emissions are then auctioned off or allocated for free, and can subsequently be traded. Installations must monitor and report their CO_{2} emissions, ensuring they hand in enough allowances to the authorities to cover their emissions. To exceed its emissions allowance, an installation must purchase allowances from others. Conversely, if an installation emits less than its allowance, it can sell its leftover credits. This allows the system to find the most cost-effective ways of reducing emissions without significant government intervention.

The scheme was said to cover energy and heat generation industries and around 11,186 plants participated in the first stage. These plants only accounted for 45% of all European emissions at the time. More than 90% of all these allowances were free of cost in both periods to build a strong base of reductions for the future phases. This free allocation resulted in the volume and value of allowances growing three-fold over 2006 with the price moving from €19/tCO_{2} in 2005 to its peak of €30/tCO_{2} which revealed a new problem. The overallocation of allowances caused the price to drop to €1/tCO_{2} in the first few months of 2007 which created market price instabilities for businesses to reinvest in low carbon-technologies.

The European Union Emission Trading Scheme (or EU-ETS) is the largest multi-national, greenhouse gas emissions trading scheme in the world. After voluntary trials in the UK and Denmark, Phase I began operation in January 2005 with all 15 member states of the European Union participating. The program caps the amount of carbon dioxide that can be emitted from large installations with a net heat supply over 20 MW, such as power plants and carbon intensive factories, and covers almost half (46%) of the EU's Carbon Dioxide emissions. Phase I permits participants to trade among themselves and in validated credits from the developing world through Kyoto's Clean Development Mechanism. Credits are gained by investing in clean technologies and low-carbon solutions, and by certain types of emission-saving projects around the world to cover a proportion of their emissions.

== History ==
The EU-ETS was the first large greenhouse gas emissions trading scheme in the world. It was launched in 2005 to fight global warming and is a major pillar of EU energy policy. As of 2013, the EU ETS covers more than 11,000 factories, power stations, and other installations with a net heat excess of 20 MW in 31 countries—all 27 EU member states plus Iceland, Norway, Liechtenstein and United Kingdom. In 2008, the installations regulated by the EU ETS were collectively responsible for close to half of the EU's anthropogenic emissions of CO_{2} and 40% of its total greenhouse gas emissions. The EU had set a target for 2020 to cut greenhouse gas emissions by 20% compared with 1990, to reduce energy consumption by 20% compared to the 2007 baseline scenario, and to achieve a 20% share of gross final energy consumption from renewable energy sources—all of which was achieved. A 2020 study estimated that the EU ETS had reduced CO_{2} emissions by more than 1 billion tons between 2008 and 2016 or 3.8% of total EU-wide emissions.

Price of CO_{2} in the EU Emissions Trading System

The EU ETS has seen a number of significant changes, with the first trading period described as a "learning by doing" phase. Phase III saw a turn to auctioning more permits rather than allocating freely (in 2013, over 40% of the allowances were auctioned); harmonisation of rules for the remaining allocations; and the inclusion of other greenhouse gases, such as nitrous oxide and perfluorocarbons. In 2012, the EU ETS was also extended to the airline industry, though this only applies within the EEA. The price of EU ETS carbon credits has been lower than intended, with a large surplus of allowances, in part because of the impact of the recent economic crisis on demand. In 2012, the Commission said it would delay the auctioning of some allowances. In 2015, Decision (EU) 2015/1814 was approved to establish a Market Stability Reserve that adjusts the annual supply of CO_{2} permits based on the CO_{2} permits in circulation in the previous year. In 2018, the Market Stability Reserve was amended by Directive (EU) 2018/410 so that a certain amount of permits inside the reserve would be cancelled from 2023 onwards.

In January 2008, Norway, Iceland, and Liechtenstein joined the European Union Emissions Trading System (EU-ETS). The Norwegian Ministry of the Environment has also released its draft National Allocation Plan which provides a carbon cap-and-trade of 15 million tonnes of CO_{2}, 8 million of which are set to be auctioned. According to the OECD Economic Survey of Norway 2010, the nation "has announced a target for 2008–12 10% below its commitment under the Kyoto Protocol and a 30% cut compared with 1990 by 2020." In 2012, EU-15 emissions was 15.1% below their base year level. Based on figures for 2012 by the European Environment Agency, EU-15 emissions averaged 11.8% below base-year levels during the 2008–2012 period. This means the EU-15 over-achieved its first Kyoto target by a wide margin.

== Mechanisms ==
The first phase of EU ETS was created to operate apart from international climate change treaties such as the pre-existing United Nations Framework Convention on Climate Change (UNFCCC, 1992) or the Kyoto Protocol that was subsequently (1997) established under it. When the Kyoto Protocol came into force on 16 February 2005, Phase I of the EU ETS had already become operational. The EU later agreed to incorporate Kyoto flexible mechanism certificates as compliance tools within the EU ETS. The "Linking Directive" allows operators to use a certain amount of Kyoto certificates from flexible mechanism projects to cover their emissions.

The Kyoto flexible mechanisms are:

- Joint Implementation projects (JI) defined by Article 6 of the Kyoto Protocol, which produce Emission Reduction Units (ERUs). One ERU represents the successful emissions reduction equivalent to one tonne of carbon dioxide equivalent (tCO_{2}e).
- The Clean Development Mechanism (CDM) defined by Article 12, which produces Certified Emission Reductions (CERs). One CER represents the successful emissions reduction equivalent to one tonne of carbon dioxide equivalent (tCO_{2}e).
- International Emissions Trading (IET) is defined by Article 17.

IET is relevant as the reductions achieved through CDM projects are a compliance tool for EU ETS operators. These Certified Emission Reductions (CERs) can be obtained by implementing emission reduction projects in developing countries, outside the EU, that have ratified (or acceded to) the Kyoto Protocol. The implementation of Clean Development Projects is largely specified by the Marrakech Accords, a follow-on set of agreements by the Conference of the Parties to the Kyoto Protocol. The legislators of the EU ETS drew up the scheme independently but called on the experiences gained during the running of the voluntary UK Emissions Trading Scheme in the previous years, and collaborated with other parties to ensure its units and mechanisms were compatible with the design agreed through the UNFCCC.

Under the EU ETS, the governments of the EU Member States agree on national emission caps which have to be approved by the EU Commission. Those countries then allocate allowances to their industrial operators and track and validate the actual emissions per the relevant assigned amount. They require the allowances to be retired after the end of each year.

The operators within the ETS may reassign or trade their allowances by several means:

- privately, moving allowances between operators within a company and across national borders
- over the counter, using a broker to privately match buyers and sellers
- trading on the spot market of one of Europe's climate exchanges

Like any other financial instrument, trading consists of matching buyers and sellers between members of the exchange and then settling by depositing a valid allowance in exchange for the agreed financial consideration. Much like a stock market, companies and private individuals can trade through brokers who are listed on the exchange, and need not be regulated operators.

When each change of ownership of an allowance is proposed, the National Emissions Trading Registry and the European Commission are informed so they can validate the transaction. During Phase II of the EU ETS, the UNFCCC also validates the allowance and any change that alters the distribution within each National allocation plan.

Like the Kyoto trading scheme, EU ETS allows a regulated operator to use carbon credits in the form of Emission Reduction Units (ERU) to comply with its obligations. A Kyoto Certified Emission Reduction unit (CER), produced by a carbon project that has been certified by the UNFCCC Clean Development Mechanism Executive Board, or Emission Reduction Unit (ERU) certified by the Joint Implementation project's host country or by the Joint Implementation Supervisory Committee, are accepted by the EU as equivalent.

Thus one EU Allowance Unit of one tonne of CO_{2}, or "EUA", was designed to be identical ("fungible") with the equivalent "assigned amount units" (AAU) of CO_{2} defined under Kyoto. Hence, because the EU decided to accept Kyoto-CERs as equivalent to EU-EUAs, it is possible to trade EUAs and UNFCCC-validated CERs on a one-to-one basis within the same system. (However, the EU was not able to link trades from all its countries until 2008-9 because of its technical problems connecting to the UN systems).

During Phase II of the EU ETS, the operators within each Member State must surrender their allowances for inspection by the EU before they can be "retired" by the UNFCCC.

=== Allocation ===
The total number of permits issued (either auctioned or allocated) determines the supply of the allowances. The actual price is determined by the market. Too many allowances compared to demand will result in a low carbon price, and reduced emission abatement efforts. Too few allowances will result in a high carbon price.

For each EU ETS Phase, the total quantity to be allocated by each Member State is defined in the National Allocation Plan (equivalent to its UNFCCC-defined carbon account). The European Commission has oversight of the NAP process and decides if the NAP satisfies the twelve criteria set out in Annex III of the Emission Trading Directive (EU Directive 2003/87/EC). The first and foremost criterion is that the proposed total quantity is in line with a Member State's Kyoto target.

Of course, the Member State's plan can, and should, also take account of emission levels in other sectors not covered by the EU ETS, and address these within its domestic policies. For instance, transport is responsible for 21% of EU greenhouse gas emissions, households, and small businesses for 17% and agriculture for 10%.

During Phase I, most allowances in all countries were given freely (known as grandfathering). This approach has been criticized as giving rise to windfall profits, being less efficient than auctioning, and providing too little incentive for innovative new competition to provide clean, renewable energy. On the other hand, allocation rather than auctioning may be justified for a few sectors that face international competition like the aluminium and steel industries.

To address these problems, the European Commission proposed various changes in a January 2008 package, including the abolishment of NAPs in 2013 and auctioning a far greater share (ca. 60% in 2013, growing afterwards) of emission permits.

From the start of Phase III (January 2013) there will be a centralized allocation of permits, not National Allocation Plans, with a greater share of auctioning of permits.

=== Allocation of EU ETS II credits ===
Unlike ETS there is no free allocation for the ETS II emission permits. Instead, all ETS II permits will be sold by the EU through auction.

=== Competitiveness ===
Allocation can act as a means of addressing concerns over loss of competitiveness, and possible "leakage" (carbon leakage) of emissions outside the EU. Leakage is the effect of emissions increasing in countries or sectors that have weaker regulation of emissions than the regulation in another country or sector. Such concerns affect the following sectors: cement, steel, aluminium, pulp and paper, basic inorganic chemicals and fertilisers/ammonia. Leakage from these sectors was thought to be under 1% of total EU emissions. Correcting for leakage by allocating permits acts as a temporary subsidy for affected industries, but does not fix the underlying problem. Border adjustments would be the economically efficient choice, where imports are taxed according to their carbon content. One problem with border adjustments is that they might be used as a disguise for trade protectionism. Some adjustments may also not prevent emissions leakage.

=== Banking and borrowing ===
Within a certain trading period, banking and borrowing are allowed. For example, a 2006 EUA can be used in 2007 (banking) or in 2005 (borrowing). Interperiod borrowing is not allowed. Member states had the discretion to decide whether banking EUAs from Phase I to Phase II was allowed.

=== Use of the revenue from the auctions ===
In 2013 - 2025, the revenue from EU ETS auctions was more than €245 billion. Most of it went directly to EU Member States. The remainder has been divided between the Innovation Fund, the Modernisation Fund, the Resilience and Recovery Facility and the Social Climate Fund. Member States and the funds are required to use the revenues for environmental and social goals. Member States report on how they used their part and the reports are publicly available on the website of the European Environment Agency (Reportnet 3).

For example, in 2023 the revenue was €43.6 billion. From them €33 billion went directly to Member States. Of this 33 billion, €30.9 billion was used to advance climate action and energy transformation, while the remaining €2.1 billion was used to cover indirect carbon costs.

Member States do not have to spend all the money in one year. From these €30.9 billion, Member States spent €22.2 billion in 2023 in the next way: €9.7 billion has been spent on energy supply, grid and storage projects, €2.3 billion went to energy efficiency, heating and cooling in buildings, €5.1 billion was used for public transport and mobility, €0.7 billion was used to support decarbonisation, and energy efficiency in the industrial sector, €2.7 billion has been spent on social support and just transition.

Examples of projects which got funding: improving energy efficiency for low-income households in France, expansion of metro in Portugal, support in reaching net-zero given to businesses in Belgium. Improving railway networks got the biggest amount - €1,400.2 million.

Member States must ensure transparency when using ETS revenues and ensure that the EU's contribution is visible, including displaying of the EU label and the label ‘(co-)Funded by the European Union Emissions Trading System’ on funded projects.

=== Members ===
The EU ETS operates in 30 countries: the 27 EU member states plus Iceland, Liechtenstein and Norway.

The United Kingdom left the EU on 31 January 2020 but remained subject to EU rules until 31 December 2020. The UK Emissions Trading Scheme (UK ETS) replaced the UK's participation in the EU ETS on 1 January 2021, but the UK government required organisations to continue to comply with their existing obligations under the 2020 scheme year, which ended on 30 April 2021.

=== Linking ===
The EU ETS is linked to the Swiss Emissions Trading System since 1 January 2020. Linking systems creates a larger carbon market, which can reduce overall compliance costs, increase market liquidity and generate a more stable carbon market. Linking systems can also be politically symbolic as it shows willingness to undertake a common effort to reduce GHG emissions. Some scholars have argued that linking may provide a starting point for developing a new, bottom-up international climate policy architecture whereby multiple unique systems successively link their various systems.

== Phase I 2005–2007 ==
In the first phase (2005–2007), the EU ETS included some 12,000 installations, representing approximately 40% of EU CO_{2} emissions, covering energy activities (combustion installations with a rated thermal input exceeding 20 MW, mineral oil refineries, coke ovens), production and processing of ferrous metals, mineral industry (cement clinker, glass and ceramic bricks) and pulp, paper and board activities.

=== Launch and operation ===
The ETS, in which all 15 Member States that were then members of the European Union participated, nominally commenced operation on 1 January 2005, although national registries were unable to settle transactions for the first few months. However, the prior existence of the UK Emissions Trading Scheme meant that market participants were already in place and ready. In its first year, 362 million tonnes of CO_{2} were traded on the market for a sum of €7.2 billion, and a large number of futures and options.

=== Prices ===
The price of allowances increased more or less steadily to a peak level in April 2006 of about €30 per tonne CO_{2}. In late April 2006, several EU countries (the Netherlands, the Czech Republic, Belgium, France, and Spain) announced that their verified (or actual) emissions were less than the number of allowances allocated to installations. The spot price for EU allowances dropped 54% from €29.20 to €13.35 in the last week of April 2006. In May 2006, the European Commission confirmed that verified CO_{2} emissions were about 80 million tonnes or 4% lower than the number of allowances distributed to installations for 2005 emissions. In May 2006, prices fell to under €10/tonne. Lack of scarcity under the first phase of the system continued through 2006 resulting in a trading price of €1.2 per tonne in March 2007, declining to €0.10 in September 2007. In 2007, carbon prices for the trial phase dropped to near zero for most of the year. Meanwhile, prices for Phase II remained significantly higher throughout, reflecting the fact that allowances for the trial phase were set to expire by 31 December 2007.

=== Verified emissions ===
Verified emissions showed a net increase over the first phase of the scheme. For the countries for which data was available, emissions increased by 1.9% between 2005 and 2007 (at the time all 27 member states minus Romania, Bulgaria, and Malta).

Country	Verified emissions			Change
Country	2005	2006	2007	2005–2007
Austria	33,372,826	32,382,804	31,751,165	−4.9%
Belgium	55,363,223	54,775,314	52,795,318	−4.6%
Cyprus	5,078,877	5,259,273	5,396,164	6.2%
Czech Republic	82,454,618	83,624,953	87,834,758	6.5%
Germany	474,990,760	478,016,581	487,004,055	2.5%
Denmark	26,475,718	34,199,588	29,407,355	11.1%
Estonia	12,621,817	12,109,278	15,329,931	21.5%
Spain	183,626,981	179,711,225	186,495,894	1.6%
Finland	33,099,625	44,621,411	42,541,327	28.5%
France	131,263,787	126,979,048	126,634,806	−3.5%
Greece	71,267,736	69,965,145	72,717,006	2.0%
Hungary	26,161,627	25,845,891	26,835,478	2.6%
Ireland	22,441,000	21,705,328	21,246,117	−5.3%
Italy	225,989,357	227,439,408	226,368,773	0.2%
Lithuania	6,603,869	6,516,911	5,998,744	−9.2%
Luxembourg	2,603,349	2,712,972	2,567,231	−1.4%
Latvia	2,854,481	2,940,680	2,849,203	−0.2%
Netherlands	80,351,288	76,701,184	79,874,658	−0.6%
Poland	203,149,562	209,616,285	209,601,993	3.2%
Portugal	36,425,915	33,083,871	31,183,076	−14.4%
Sweden	19,381,623	19,884,147	15,348,209	−20.8%
Slovenia	8,720,548	8,842,181	9,048,633	3.8%
Slovakia	25,231,767	25,543,239	24,516,830	−2.8%
United Kingdom	242,513,099	251,159,840	256,581,160	5.8%
Total	2,012,043,453	2,033,636,557	2,049,927,884	1.9%

- Figures are in tonnes of CO_{2}
- Source: European Commission Press Release 23 May 2008

Consequently, observers accused national governments of abusing the system under industry pressure, and urged far stricter caps in the second phase (2008–2012). This led to a stricter regime in the second phase.

== Phase II 2008–12 ==
=== Scope ===
The second phase (2008–12) expanded the scope of the scheme significantly. In 2007, three non-EU members, Norway, Iceland, and Liechtenstein joined the scheme. The EU's "Linking Directive" introduced the CDM and JI credits. Although this was a theoretical possibility in phase I, the over-allocation of permits combined with the inability to bank them for use in the second phase meant it was not taken up.

During Phases I and II, allowances for emissions have typically been given free to firms, which has resulted in them getting windfall profits. Ellerman and Buchner (2008) suggested that during its first two years in operation, the EU-ETS turned an expected increase in emissions of 1–2% per year into a small absolute decline. Grubb et al. (2009) suggested that a reasonable estimate for the emissions cut achieved during its first two years of operation was 50–100 MtCO_{2} per year, or 2.5–5%.

On 27 April 2012, the European Commission announced the full activation of the EU Emissions Trading System single registry. The full activation process included the migration of over 30,000 EU ETS accounts from national registries. The European Commission further stated that the single registry to be activated in June will not contain all the required functionalities for phase III of the EU ETS.

Phase II saw some tightening, but the use of JI and CDM offsets was allowed, with the result that no reductions in the EU will be required to meet the Phase II cap. For Phase II, the cap is expected to result in an emissions reduction in 2010 of about 2.4% compared to expected emissions without the cap (business-as-usual emissions).

=== Aviation emissions ===
Aviation emissions were to be included from 2012. The inclusion of aviation was considered important by the EU. The inclusion of aviation was estimated to increase in demand for allowances by about 10–12 million tonnes of CO_{2} per year in phase two. According to DEFRA, increased use of JI credits from projects in Russia and Ukraine would offset any increase in prices so there would be no discernible impact on average annual CO_{2} prices.

The airline industry and other countries including China, India, Russia, and the United States reacted adversely to the inclusion of the aviation sector. The United States and other countries argued that the EU did not have jurisdiction to regulate flights when they were not in European skies; China and the United States threatened to ban their national carriers from complying with the scheme. On 27 November 2012, the United States enacted the European Union Emissions Trading Scheme Prohibition Act of 2011 which prohibits U.S. carriers from participating in the European Union Emission Trading Scheme. China threatened to withhold $60 billion in outstanding orders from Airbus, which in turn led to France pressuring the EU to freeze the scheme.

The EU insisted that the regulation should be applied equally to all carriers and that it did not contravene international regulations. In the absence of a global agreement on airline emissions, the EU argued that it was forced to go ahead with its scheme. But only flights within the EEA are covered; international flights are not.

=== Other ===
Ultimately, the Commission intended that the third trading period should cover all greenhouse gases and all sectors, including aviation, maritime transport, and forestry. For the transport sector, the large number of individual users adds complexities but might be implemented either as a cap-and-trade system for fuel suppliers or a baseline-and-credit system for car manufacturers.

The National Allocation Plans for Phase II, the first of which were announced on 29 November 2006, provided for an average reduction of nearly 7% below the 2005 emission levels. However, the use of offsets such as Emission Reduction Units from JI and Certified Emission Reductions from CDM projects was allowed, with the result that the EU would be able to meet the Phase II cap by importing units instead of reducing emissions (CCC, 2008, pp. 145, 149).

According to verified EU data from 2008, the ETS resulted in an emissions reduction of 3%, or 50 million tons. At least 80 million tons of "carbon offsets" were bought for compliance with the scheme.

In late 2006, the European Commission started infringement proceedings against Austria, Czech Republic, Denmark, Hungary, Italy and Spain, for failure to submit their proposed National Allocation Plans on time.

In July 2020, The Environment Committee of the European Parliament voted to include CO_{2} emissions from the maritime sector in the European Union (EU) Emissions Trading System (ETS), starting in January 2024, with ships over 5,000 GT required to pay for emissions.

The European Union has set specific decarbonization goals starting in 2024. The revised Renewable Energy Directive (RED III) aims to reduce the greenhouse gas emission intensity of transport by 14.5% or increase the share of renewable energy in final energy consumption to at least 29% (e.g., through e-mobility) by 2030. RED III also sets blending quotas for advanced biofuels, impacting the demand for sustainable liquid fuels.

The ReFuelEU Aviation initiative requires the aviation industry to blend sustainable fuels into their operations, starting at 6% by 2030 and increasing to 70% by 2050, with a notable emphasis on e-fuels, which should constitute 35% by 2050. In the maritime sector, the FuelEU Maritime regulation mandates shipping companies to decrease their greenhouse gas emission intensity by up to 6% by 2030 and by 80% by 2050.

=== State allocation plans ===
The annual Member State CO_{2} allowances in million tonnes are shown in the table:

Million tonnes of CO_{2} yearly allowances
Member State	1st period cap	2005 verified emissions	2008–2012 cap	
Member State	1st period cap	2005 verified emissions	State request	Cap allowed
Austria	33.0	33.4	32.8	30.7
Belgium	62.1	55.58 (Note: Including installations opted out in 2005)	63.33	58.5
Bulgaria	42.3	40.6	67.6	42.3
Cyprus (Note: Cyprus and Malta, as new EU accession states, but not Annex I countries, will have their own NAPs and participate in trading during Phase II.)	5.7	5.1	7.12	5.48
Czech Republic	97.6	82.5	101.9	86.8
Denmark	33.5	26.5	24.5	24.5
Estonia	19	12.62	24.38	12.72
Finland	45.5	33.1	39.6	37.6
France	156.5	131.3	132.8	132.8
Hungary	31.3	26.0	30.7	26.9
Germany	499	474	482	453.1
Greece	74.4	71.3	75.5	69.1
Ireland	22.3	22.4	22.6	21.15
Italy	223.1	222.5	209	195.8
Latvia	4.6	2.9	7.7	3.3
Lithuania	12.3	6.6	16.6	8.8
Luxembourg	3.4	2.6	3.95	2.7
Malta	2.9	1.98	2.96	2.1
Netherlands	95.3	80.35 (Note: Verified emissions for 2005 do not include installations opted out in 2005 which will be covered in 2008 and 2012 and are estimated to amount to some 6 Mt.)	90.4	85.8
Poland	239.1	203.1	284.6	208.5
Portugal	38.9	36.4	35.9	34.8
Romania	74.8	70.8	95.7	75.9
Slovakia	30.5	25.2	41.3	30.9
Slovenia	8.8	8.7	8.3	8.3
Spain	174.4	182.9	152.7	152.3
Sweden	22.9	19.3	25.2	22.8
United Kingdom	245.3	242.4 (Note: UK's verified emissions for 2005 do not include installations opted out in 2005 which will be covered in 2008 and 2012 and are estimated to amount to some 30 Mt.)	246.2	246.2
Totals	2298.5	2122.16	2325.34	2080.93

=== Carbon price ===
The carbon price within Phase II increased to over €20/tCO_{2} in the first half of 2008 (CCC, 2008, p. 149). The average price was €22/tCO_{2} in the second half of 2008, and €13/tCO_{2} in the first half of 2009. CCC (2009, p. 67) gave two reasons for this fall in prices:

- Reduced output in energy-intensive sectors as a result of the recession. This means that less abatement will be required to meet the cap, lowering the carbon price.
- The market perception of future fossil fuel prices may have been revised downwards.

Projections made in 2009 indicate that like Phase I, Phase II would see a surplus in allowances and that 2009 carbon prices were being sustained by the need to "bank" allowances to surrender them in the tougher third phase. In December 2009, carbon prices dropped to a six-month low after the Copenhagen climate summit outcome disappointed traders. Prices for EU allowances for December 2010 delivery dropped 8.7% to 12.40 euros a tonne.

In March 2012, according to the Periodical Economist, the EUA permit price under the EU ETS had "tanked" and was too low to provide incentives for firms to reduce emissions. The permit price had been persistently under €10 per tonne compared to nearly €30 per tonne in 2008. The market had been oversupplied with permits. In June 2012, EU allowances for delivery in December 2012 traded at 6.76 euros each on the Intercontinental Exchange Futures Europe exchange, a 61% decline compared with a year previously.

In July 2012, Thomson Reuters Point Carbon stated that it considered that without intervention to reduce the supply of allowances, the price of allowances would fall to four Euros. The 2012 closing price for an EU allowance with a December 2013 contract ended the year at 6.67 euros a tonne. In late January 2013, the EU allowance price fell to a new record low of 2.81 euros after the energy and industry committee of the European parliament opposed a proposal to withhold 900 million future-dated allowances from the market.

== Phase III 2013–2020 ==
For Phase III (2013–2020), the European Commission implemented many changes, including (CCC, 2008, p. 149):

- the setting of an overall EU cap, with allowances then allocated to EU members;
- tighter limits on the use of offsets;
- limiting banking of allowances between Phases II and III;
- a move from allowances to auctioning;
- and the inclusion of more sectors and gases.

Also, millions of allowances set aside in the New Entrants Reserve (NER) to fund the deployment of innovative renewable energy technologies and carbon capture and storage through the NER 300 programme, one of the world's largest funding programmes for innovative low-carbon energy demonstration projects. The programme is conceived as a catalyst for the demonstration of environmentally safe carbon capture and storage (CCS) and innovative renewable energy (RES) technologies on a commercial scale within the European Union.

Ahead of its accession to the EU, Croatia joined the ETS at the start of Phase III on 1 January 2013. This took the number of countries in the EU ETS to 31.

On 4 January 2013, European Union allowances for 2013 traded on London's ICE Futures Europe exchange for between 6.22 euros and 6.40 euros.

The number of excess allowances carried over ("banked") from Phase II to Phase III was 1.7 billion.

== Phase IV 2021–2030 ==
Phase IV commenced on 1 January 2021 and will finish on 31 December 2030. The European Commission plans a full review of the Directive by 2026. Since 2018, prices have continuously increased, reaching €57/tCO_{2} (64 $) in July 2021. This results in additional costs of about €0.04/kWh for coal and €0.02/kWh for gas combustion for electricity.

=== Reform of the EU-ETS and introduction of the Market Stability Reserve (MSR) ===
On 22 January 2014, the European Commission proposed two structural reform amendments to the ETS directive (2003/87/EC) of the 2008 Climate Package to be agreed on in the Council Conclusions on 20–21 March 2014 by the Heads of EU Member States at the meeting of the European Council:

- The linear reduction factor, at which the overall emissions cap is reduced, from 1.74% (2013–2020) to 2.2% each year from 2021 to 2030, thus reducing EU CO_{2} emissions in the ETS sector by 43% compared to 2005
- The creation of a 12% "automatic set-aside" reserve mechanism of verified annual emissions (at least a 100 million CO_{2} permit reserve) in the fourth ETS period from 2021 to 2030

Connie Hedegaard, the EU Commissioner for Climate Change, hoped "to link up the ETS with compatible systems around the world to form the backbone of a global carbon market" with Australia cited as an example. However, as the COP 19 Climate Conference again ended with no binding new international agreement in 2013, and after the election of the Liberal-National government, Australia dismantled its ETS system.

Before the European Council summit on 20 March 2014, the European Commission decided to propose a change in the functioning of the carbon market (CO_{2} permits). The submitted legislation on the Market Stability Reserve system (MSR) would change the amount of annually auctioned CO_{2} permits based on the amount of CO_{2} permits in circulation. On 24 October 2014, at the meeting of the European Council, the Heads of Governments of EU Member States provided legal certainty to the proposed Market Stability Reserve (MSR) by sanctioning the political project in the text of the Council Conclusions. This would address imbalances in supply and demand in the European carbon market by adjusting volumes for auction. The reserve would operate on predefined rules with no discretion for the commission or Member States.

The European Parliament and the European Council informally agreed on an adapted version of this proposal, which sets the starting date of the MSR to 2019 (so already in Phase III), puts the 900 million backloaded allowances in the reserve and reduces the reaction time of the MSR to one year. The adopted proposal was passed as Decision (EU) 2015/1814 by the European Parliament and the Council of Ministers in 2015.

In 2023, carbon prices fell to around 70 euros per ton, down from over 100 euros, affecting funding for the EU Innovation Fund and highlighting the MSR's critical role in stabilizing the market.

=== Reform of the Market Stability Reserve (MSR) ===
In the years 2014–2017, the back-loading of auction volumes and the legislation on introducing the MSR had neither substantially decreased the surplus of allowances nor substantially increased allowance prices in the EU-ETS, with EUA prices remaining below €10/tCO_{2}. In 2018, the MSR was reformed again with Directive (EU) 2018/410, primarily to reduce the surplus of emissions allowances and create additional scarcity:

- For the period from 2019 to 2023, the share of allowances put into the MSR was increased from 12% to 24%
- From 2023 onwards, all allowances in the MSR above the total number of allowances auctioned during the previous year will become invalid.
- Unilateral invalidation of allowances by member states that take additional policy measures leading to reduced demand for EUAs.

This reform led to a strong increase in EUA prices in 2018, with prices staying mostly in a range of €18-30/tCO_{2} from August 2018 to March 2020. A scientific study analyzing the effect of the reform found that the substantial price increase could not be explained by the changes to the ETS/MSR alone, but that there also needed to be a change in the foresight of market actors: Through the reform, policymakers increased commitment to the EU ETS, making a long-term survival of the EU-ETS more credible. Thus, firms started acting with more foresight, taking expected future certificate scarcity into account.

=== "Fit for 55" package ===
The change in the overall EU emissions target to a –55% reduction versus 1990 in the European Green Deal necessitated tightening of the EU ETS reduction target for 2030 of –43% concerning 2005. The EU Commission proposed in its "Fit for 55" package to increase the EU ETS reduction target for 2030 to –61% compared to 2005. Such a tighter EU ETS target could increase the scarcity of EUAs and thus raise EUA prices higher, with modelling studies estimating carbon prices in the range of €90-€130/tCO_{2} for 2030.

The EU Commission also proposed to include emissions from maritime transport in the EU ETS.

=== Russian invasion of Ukraine 2022 ===
The 24 February 2022 invasion sent carbon prices plunging from €97 in early February down to below €70.

=== ETS 2 ===
As part of the 2023 revisions of the ETS Directive, a new emissions trading system named ETS2 was created. It will address the CO2 emissions in buildings, road transport and more sectors not covered by the existing ETS. So far, emission reductions in those sectors have been insufficient to achieve climate neutrality by 2050.

It will cover emissions upstream - fuel suppliers, rather than end consumers will need to report, pay for and reduce emissions. The cap is planned to be set on a level sufficient for reducing emissions by 42% by 2030 compared to 2005 levels. The revenues will be used for climate action and social measures, including through the Social Climate Fund, which main purpose is to support vulnerable groups. The European Commission has published a study showing how to decarbonise sectors covered by ETS2, in a just way.

ETS2 has been designed to start in a smooth manner. Monitoring and reporting of emissions will begin in 2025 and in 2027 the system will become operational. During 2027, 30% more allowances will be provided. ETS2 will operate with a market stability reserve to address insufficient or excessive supply of allowances. During the first 3 years, if the price of allowances exceeds €45, more allowances can be released. If the prices of oil or gas will be very high in 2026, the start of the ETS2 could be delayed to 2028.

After the ETS2 will be introduced, 75% of the emissions of the European Union will be covered by a cap and trade system.

In 2025 the activation of ETS2 was delayed to 2028 under political pressure from "Member States concerned about inflation and energy affordability" significantly hurting the environmental and social targets of the EU. The decision reflect "growing tension between political feasibility and climate urgency."

== Reaching net zero ==
After 2039 no more allowances will be distributed. After the unused allowances will end also, no more emissions will be permitted.

== Costs ==
Emissions in the EU have been reduced at costs that are significantly lower than projected, though transaction costs are related to economies of scale and can be significant for smaller installations. Overall, the estimated cost was a fraction of 1% of GDP. It was suggested that if permits were auctioned, and the revenues used effectively, e.g., to reduce distortionary taxes and fund low-carbon technologies, costs could be eliminated, or even create a positive economic impact.

== Carbon Border Adjustment Mechanism (CBAM) ==
From 2026, the European Union is activating a carbon border tax called Carbon Border Adjustment Mechanism (CBAM). The aim is to stop the problem of carbon leakage: the cost imposed by the European emission trading system making the European companies less competitive in comparison to foreign companies which do not make similar efforts for decarbonisation. As a result, instead of buying European products, the consumers in the European Union are buying imported products with high emissions, so instead of declining the emissions just travel to other countries and the European industry suffer losses. Therefore, with the help of this tax the European Union will force companies from other countries to pay similar price for carbon. This will permit to stop allocating allowances for free to hard-to-decarbonize sectors of the economy, which was done until now to prevent carbon leakage.

If countries outside the European Union have or will create their own carbon pricing policies, "they will avoid the EU's carbon border tax and keep the revenues for their own decarbonization projects". A similar UK CBAM will be implemented by 2027. It has been suggested that the mechanism will help reduce emissions not only by making companies reduce emissions but also by incentivising other countries (like the United States, which lacks federal carbon pricing) to create similar mechanisms. Some authors even argue that the CBAM constitutes the beginning of a climate club, as proposed by Nobel Memorial Prize winner William Nordhaus. Japan, China and South Korea will pay high fees, and they already began to improve their emissions trading systems.

China expanded its ETS to new sectors and will put an absolute cap on emissions instead of intensity based, among other because of CBAM. The carbon market in India and Turkish Emissions Trading System aim to keep the revenues for their own budgets. Other countries installing their own carbon pricing mechanisms due to CBAM include Brazil, Indonesia, Taiwan, Vietnam, Malaysia and Serbia. Partially due to CBAM the Open Coalition on Compliance Carbon Markets was created during the 2025 United Nations Climate Change Conference with the aim of creating a global carbon market.

== Overall emission reductions ==
Development of CO_{2} emissions in the European Union

According to the European Commission, greenhouse gas emissions from big emitters covered by the EU ETS had decreased by an average of more than 17,000 tonnes per installation between 2005 and 2010, a decrease of more than 8%.

A 2020 study found that the European Union Emissions Trading System successfully reduced CO_{2} emissions even though the prices for carbon were set at low prices. A review of 13 studies on the EU ETS quantifies the emission reduction effect at about 7%.

A 2023 study on the effects of the EU ETS identified a reduction in carbon emissions in the order of a 10% decrease between 2005 and 2012. The study compared regulated and unregulated companies, concluding that the EU ETS had no significant impact on profits and employment and led to an increase in revenues and fixed assets for regulated companies.

According to the site of the European parliament "Between 2005 and 2023, emissions from power plants and factories covered by the EU emissions trading system fell by 47%".

== Inclusion of sinks ==
Currently, the EU does not allow CO_{2} credits under ETS to be obtained from sinks (e.g. reducing CO_{2} by planting trees). However, some governments and industry representatives lobby for their inclusion. The inclusion is currently opposed by NGOs as well as the EU commission itself, arguing that sinks are surrounded by too many scientific uncertainties over their permanence and that they have an inferior long-term contribution to climate change compared to reducing emissions from industrial sources.

== ETS related crime ==
=== Cybercrime ===
On 19 January 2011, the EU emissions spot market for pollution permits was closed after computer hackers stole 28 to 30 million euros ($41.12 million) worth of emissions allowances from the national registries of several European countries within a few days. The Czech Registry for Emissions Trading was especially hard hit with 7 million euros worth of allowances stolen by hackers from Austria, the Czech Republic, Greece, Estonia, and Poland. A phishing scam is suspected to have enabled hackers to log into unsuspecting companies' carbon credit accounts and transfer the allowances to themselves, allowing them to then be sold.

The European Commission said it would "proceed to determine together with national authorities what minimum security measures need to be put in place before the suspension of a registry can be lifted". Maria Kokkonen, an EC spokeswoman for climate issues, said that national registries can be reopened once sufficient security measures have been enacted and member countries submit to the EC a report of their IT security protocol.

The Czech registry said there are still legal and administrative hurdles to be overcome and Jiri Stastny, chairman of OTE AS, the Czech registry operator, said that until there is recourse for victims of such theft, and a system is in place to return allowances to their rightful owners, the Czech registry will remain closed. Registry officials in Germany and Estonia have confirmed they have located 610,000 allowances stolen from the Czech registry, according to Mr Stastny. Another 500,000 of the stolen Czech allowances are thought to be in accounts in the UK, according to the OTE.

Cyber fraudsters have also attacked the EU ETS with a "phishing" scam which cost one company €1.5 million. In response to this, the EU has revised the ETS rules to combat crime.

The security breaches raised fears among some traders that they might have unknowingly purchased stolen allowances which they might later have to forfeit. The ETS experienced a previous phishing scam in 2010 which caused 13 European markets to shut down, and criminals cleared 5 million euros in another cross-border fraud in 2008 and 2009.

=== VAT fraud ===
In 2009 Europol informed that 90% market volume of emissions trading in some countries could be the result of tax fraud, more specifically missing trader fraud, costing governments more than 5 billion euros.

German prosecutors confirmed in March 2011 that value-added-tax fraud in the trade of carbon dioxide emissions has deprived the German state of about €850 million ($1.19 billion). In December 2011 a German court sentenced six people to jail terms of between three years and seven years and 10 months in a trial involving evasion of taxes on carbon permits. A French court sentenced five people to one to five years in jail, and to pay massive fines for evading tax through carbon trading. In the UK a first trial over VAT fraud in the carbon market is put on track to start in February 2012.

== Views on the EU ETS ==
People and organizations responded differently to the EU ETS. Mr. Anne Theo Seinen, of the EC's Directorate-General for the Environment, described Phase I as a "learning phase", where, for example, the infrastructure and institutions for the ETS were set up (UK Parliament, 2009). In his view, the carbon price in Phase I had resulted in some abatement. Seinen also commented that the EU ETS needed to be supported by other policies for technology and renewable energy. According to CCC (2008, p. 155), technology policy is necessary to overcome market failures associated with delivering low-carbon technologies, e.g., by supporting research and development.

In 2009 the World Wildlife Fund commented that there was no indication that the EU ETS had influenced longer-term investment decisions. In their view, the Phase III scheme brought about significant improvements but still suffered from major weaknesses. Jones et al. (2008, p. 24) suggested that the EU ETS needed further reform to achieve its potential.

A 2016 survey of German companies participating in the EU ETS found that under current trading conditions, the EU ETS has generated weak incentives for participating firms to adopt carbon abatement measures.

=== Criticisms ===
The EU ETS has been criticized for several points including: over-allocation, windfall profits, price volatility, and in general failure to meet its goals. Proponents maintain, however, that Phase I of the EU ETS (2005–2007) was a "learning phase" designed primarily to establish baselines and create the infrastructure for a carbon market, not to achieve significant reductions.

Some design flaws have limited the effectiveness of the scheme. In the initial 2005–07 period, emission caps were not tight enough to drive a significant reduction in emissions. The total allocation of allowances turned out to exceed actual emissions. This drove the carbon price down to zero in 2007. This oversupply was caused because the allocation of allowances by the EU was based on emissions data from the European Environmental Agency in Copenhagen, which uses a horizontal activity-based emissions definition similar to the United Nations, the EU-ETS Transaction log in Brussels, but a vertical installation-based emissions measurement system. This caused an oversupply of 200 million tonnes (10% of the market) in the EU-ETS in the first phase and collapsing prices.

In addition, the EU ETS has been criticized as having caused a disruptive spike in energy prices. Defenders of the scheme say that this spike did not correlate with the price of permits, and the largest price increase occurred at a time (Mar–Dec 2007) when the cost of permits was negligible.

Researchers Preston Teeter and Jorgen Sandberg have argued that it is largely the uncertainty behind the EU's scheme that has resulted in such a tepid and informal response by regulated organizations. Their research has revealed a similar outcome in Australia, where organizations saw little incentive to innovate and even comply with cap and trade regulations.

Some critics in the EU blamed the EU ETS for contributing to the 2021 global energy crisis.

=== Over-allocation ===
There was an oversupply of emissions allowances for EU ETS Phase I. This drove the carbon price down to zero in 2007 (CCC, 2008, p. 140). This oversupply reflects the difficulty in predicting future emissions which is necessary for setting a cap. Given poor data about emissions baselines, the inherent uncertainty of emissions forecasts, and the very modest reduction goals of the Phase I cap (1–2% across the EU), it was entirely expected that the cap might be set too high.

This problem naturally diminishes as the cap tightens. The EU's Phase II cap is more than 6% below 2005 levels, much stronger than Phase I, and readily distinguishable from business-as-usual emissions levels.

Over-allocation does not imply that no abatement occurred. Even with over-allocation, there was theoretically a price on carbon (except for installations that received hundreds of thousands of free allowances). For some installations, the price had some effect on emitters' behaviour. Verified emissions in 2005 were 3–4% below projected emissions, and analysis suggests that at least part of that reduction was due to the EU ETS.

In September 2012, Thomson Reuters Point Carbon calculated that the first Kyoto Protocol commitment period had been oversupplied by about 13 billion tonnes (13.1 Gt) of CO_{2} and that the second commitment period (2013–2020) was likely to start with a surplus of Assigned Amount Units (AAUs).

=== Windfall profits ===
According to Newbery (2009), the price of EUAs was included in the final price of electricity. The free allocation of permits was cashed in at the EUA price by fossil generators, resulting in a "massive windfall gain". Newbery (2009) wrote that "[there] is no case for repeating such a willful misuse of the value of a common property resource that the country should own". In the view of 4CMR (2009), all permits in the EU ETS should be auctioned. This would avoid possible windfall profits in all sectors.

=== Price volatility ===
The price of emissions permits tripled in the first six months of Phase I, collapsed by half in a one week in 2006 and declined to zero over the next twelve months. Such movements and the implied volatility raised questions about the viability of the Phase I system to provide stable incentives to emitters.

In future phases, measures such as banking of allowances, auctioning, and price floors were considered to mitigate volatility. However, considerable volatility is expected of this type of market, and the volatility seen is quite in line with that of energy commodities generally. Nonetheless, producers and consumers in those markets respond rationally and effectively to price signals.

Newbery (2009) commented that Phase I of the EU ETS was not delivering the stable carbon price necessary for long-term, low-carbon investment decisions. He suggested that efforts should be made to stabilize carbon prices, e.g., by having a price ceiling and a price floor. This led to the reforms outlined above in Phases II and III.

== Offsetting ==
=== Project based offsetting ===
The EU ETS is "linked" to the Joint Implementation and Clean Development Mechanism projects as it allows the limited use of "offset credits" from them. Participating firms were allowed to use some Certified Emission Reduction units (CERs) from 2005 and Emission Reduction Units (ERUs) from 2008. Each Member State's National Allocation Plan must specify a percentage of the national allocation that will be the cap on the CERs and ERUs that may be used. CERs and ERUs from nuclear facilities and Land Use, Land-Use Change and Forestry may not be used.

The main theoretical advantage of allowing free trading of credits is that it allows mitigation to be done at least cost (CCC, 2008, p. 160). This is because the marginal costs (that is to say, the incremental costs of preventing the emission of one extra ton of CO_{2}e into the atmosphere) of abatement differs among countries. In terms of the UK's climate change policy, CCC (2008), noted three arguments against too great a reliance on credits:

- Rich countries need to demonstrate that a low-carbon economy is possible and compatible with economic prosperity. This is to convince developing countries to lower their emissions. Additionally, domestic action by rich countries drives investment towards a low-carbon economy.
- An ambitious long-term target to reduce emissions, e.g., an 80% cut in UK emissions by 2050, requires significant domestic progress by 2020 and 2030 to reduce emissions.
- CDM credits are inherently less robust than a cap and trade system, where reductions are required in total emissions.

Due to the economic downturn, states have pushed successfully for a more generous approach towards the use of CDM/JI credits post-2012. The 2009 EU ETS Amending Directive states that credits can be used for up to 50% of the EU-wide reductions below the 2005 levels of existing sectors over the period 2008–2020. Moreover, it has been argued that the volume of CDM/JI credits, if carried over from phase II (2008–2012 to phase III 2013–2020) in the EU ETS will undermine its environmental effectiveness, despite the requirement of supplementarity in the Kyoto Protocol.

In January 2011, the EU Climate Change Committee banned the use of CDM Certified Emission Reduction units from HFC-23 destruction in the European Union Emissions Trading Scheme from 1 May 2013. The ban includes nitrous oxide (N2O) from adipic acid production. The reasons given were the perverse incentives, the lack of additionality, the lack of environmental integrity, the undermining of the Montreal Protocol, costs and ineffectiveness and the distorting effect of a few projects in advanced developing countries getting too many CERs.

=== Buying and deleting emissions allowances ===
As an alternative to CDM and JI projects, emissions can be offset directly by buying and deleting emissions allowances inside the ETS. This is a way to avoid several problems of CDM and JI such as additionality, measurement, leakage, permanence, and verification. Buying and cancelling allowances allows you to include more emissions sources in the ETS (such as traffic). Furthermore, it reduces the available allowances in the cap-and-trade system, which means that it reduces the emissions that can be produced by covered sources.

== Criticism ==
In March 2026, ten European Union member states called on the European Commission to extend the allocation of free carbon permits to industrial sectors beyond 2034. Signatories to the letter—including Austria, Bulgaria, Croatia, the Czech Republic, Greece, Hungary, Italy, Poland, Romania, and Slovakia—requested the measure to alleviate surging energy costs and industrial burdens driven by the ongoing U.S.-Israeli war on Iran. Signed by leaders including Polish Prime Minister Donald Tusk and Italian Prime Minister Giorgia Meloni, the letter requested a "thorough review" of the EU Emissions Trading Scheme (ETS) to mitigate the impact of carbon pricing on electricity prices. The signatories argued that the phase-out of free allowances, currently scheduled to accelerate from 2028, should be smoothed to prevent "excessive burdens" on industry during the energy crisis.

== See also ==
- Carbon emission trading
- Carbon finance
- Carbon tax
- Energy policy of the European Union
- European Climate Change Programme
- ICAP (International Carbon Action Partnership)
- Mitigation of global warming
- Single European Sky
