= UK Emissions Trading Scheme =

The UK Emissions Trading Scheme (UK ETS) is the carbon emission trading scheme of the United Kingdom. It is cap and trade and came into operation on 1 January 2021 following the UK's departure from the European Union. The cap is reduced in line with the UK's 2050 net zero commitment.

Carbon Price Support (CPS) is an additional tax, paid by electricity generation companies that use fossil fuels, introduced in 2013 in response to the low prices then on the European Union Emissions Trading System.

== Phase 1: 2021 to 2025 ==
Although initially somewhat similar to the earlier UK participation in the European Union Emission Trading Scheme (EU ETS), there are differences. The initial cap is 5% lower than the UK's share under phase four of the EU ETS.

== Price stabilisation ==
The auction reserve price is £22 per tonne, which is the minimum to be paid at auction.

== Coverage ==
The UK ETS is initially limited to internal flights, electricity generation and industries which use a lot of energy: but the scheme will be expanded.

== International Offsets ==
As of 2021 international carbon offsets are not permitted.

== Enforcement ==
As of 2021 the fine for exceeding allowances is £100 per tonne.

== Former voluntary scheme ==
The former UK Emissions Trading Scheme was a voluntary emissions trading system created as a pilot prior to the mandatory EUETS. It ran from 2002 and it closed to new entrants in 2009. Management of the scheme transferred to the Department of Energy and Climate Change in 2008.

At the time, the scheme was a novel economic approach, being the first multi-industry carbon trading system in the world. (Denmark ran a pilot greenhouse gas trading scheme between 2001 and 2003 but this only involved eight electricity companies). It took note of the emerging international consensus on the benefits of carbon trading that were being proposed in the mandatory Kyoto Protocol, which had not been ratified at that time, and allowed government and corporate early movers and to gain experience in the auction process and the trading system that the later schemes have entailed. It ran in parallel with a tax on energy use, the Climate Change Levy, introduced in April 2001, but companies could get a discount on the tax if they elected to make reductions through participation in the trading scheme.

The voluntary trading scheme recruited 34 participants from UK industries and organisations who promised to make reductions in their carbon emissions, this has since expanded to 54 sectors of the UK economy. In return they received a share of a £215 million "incentive fund" from the Department for Environment, Food and Rural Affairs (DEFRA). Each agreed to hold sufficient allowances to cover its actual emissions for that year, and participate in a cap and trade system, with an annually reducing cap. Each participant could then decide to take action to manage its emissions to exactly meet its target, or reduce its actual emissions below its target (thereby releasing allowances that it could sell on, or save for use in future years), or buy allowances from other participants to cover any excess.

From March 2002, DEFRA ran an auction of emission allowances to perform allocations to participants, after the start of the mandatory EU scheme.

The UK's National Audit Office and DEFRA's consultants ran reviews of the system in order to establish its basis and drew lessons from it.

The review concluded that the scheme did achieve some emission reductions from the participants, although more could have been achieved had targets been more demanding.

- The 34 companies that participated took advantage of the incentive fund to pay for reduction measures, and in practice most were incentivised to make additional efforts to further cut emissions beyond their targets. They gained experience in pricing strategies and were prepared in advance of the start of the mandatory scheme.
- The companies that provided emissions trading brokerage and verification were able to establish their new businesses in the UK, and have since translated that first mover advantage to establish themselves on the European and wider international trading arena.
- DEFRA discovered the issues and practicalities of negotiating and setting baselines and running an auction process.
