= Vallibel Power Erathna =

Renewable energy company in Sri Lanka

Vallibel Power Erathna PLC
- Logo of Vallibel Power Erathna PLC
- Company type: Public
- Traded as: CSE: VPEL.N0000
- ISIN: LK0352N00001
- Industry: Utility industry; Renewable energy
- Founded: November 7, 2001; 24 years ago
- Headquarters: Colombo, Sri Lanka
- Key people: Harsha Amarasekera (Chairman); Russell De Zilva (Joint CEO); A. K. Dheerasinghe (Joint CEO)
- Revenue: ▼LKR1,123 million (2023)
- Operating income: ▼LKR833 million (2023)
- Net income: ▼LKR655 million (2023)
- Total assets: ▲LKR3,751 million (2023)
- Total equity: ▲LKR3,348 million (2023)
- Owners: Vallibel Power Ltd (40.08%); Dhammika Perera (19.38%); Sri Lanka Insurance Corporation Life Fund (3.88%)
- Number of employees: 93 (2023)
- Subsidiaries: Country Energy (Pvt) Ltd
- Website: vallibel-hydro.com

Vallibel Power Erathna PLC is a renewable energy company in Sri Lanka. The company operates three small hydropower projects. The company was incorporated in 2001 and in 2006, the company was listed on the Colombo Stock Exchange. Vallibel Power Erathna won the special honoree award in Forbes Asia's Best Under a Billion awards in 2015. Two projects of the company were eligible for the United Nations' Clean Development Mechanism.

== History ==
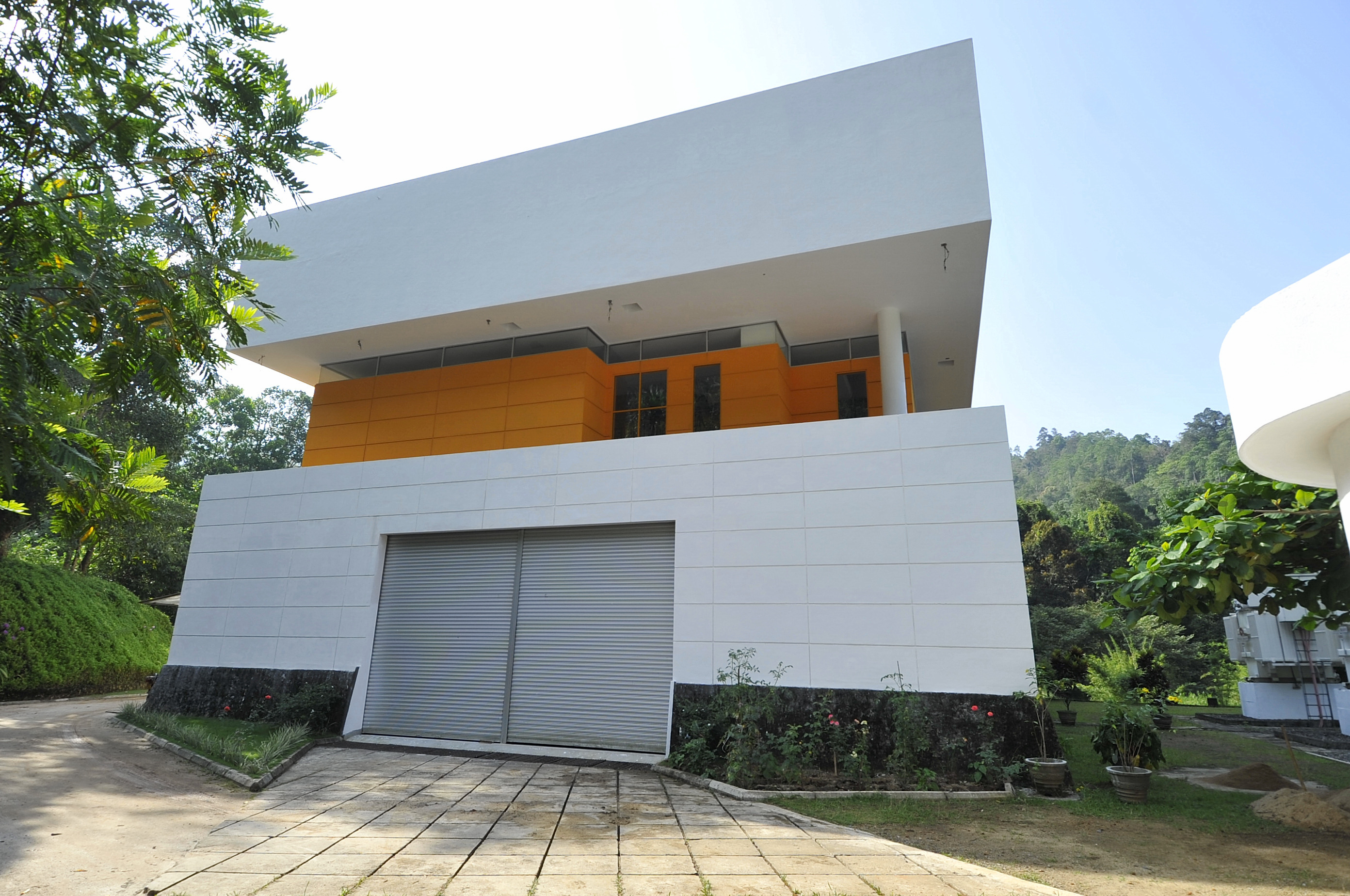
Erathna powerhouse is operational since 2004

The company was incorporated in 2001 as Zyrex Power Company Erathna Ltd and commenced the construction of the Erathna Mini Hydro Power Project. Erathna project commenced on 2004 and the company name changed to Power Company Erathna Ltd. The company adopted its current name a year later. In 2006, the company went public and was listed on the Colombo Stock Exchange. Vallibel Power acquired f Country Energy (Pvt) Ltd in 2009 and the construction of Denawaka Ganga Mini Hydro Power Project and Kiriwaneliya Mini Hydro Power Project began in the same year. These projects started off the commercial operations in 2012.

Seychelles' President James Michel paid a visit to the Erathna power station on his state visit to Sri Lanka in 2012. A delegation of senior officials headed by the president wanted to study the energy generation strategy of Sri Lanka. Under the United Nations Framework Convention on Climate Change, Denawaka Ganga and Kiriwaneliya projects were qualified for the Clean Development Mechanism. In 2015, Vallibel Power Erathna was one of the four companies to win the special honoree award in Asia's Best Under a Billion award ceremony organised by Forbes Asia.

== Operations ==
The total installed capacity of the three power stations is 21.85 MW. Vallibel Power Erathna has been declared the winner of the Association of Chartered Certified Accountants (ACCA) Sri Lanka's sustainability reporting awards in the small and medium enterprise category. The company entered into an agreement with the Ceylon Electricity Board for a power purchase agreement for the sale of electricity from the Erathna project. The agreement is valid until 2024 and extendable up to 2039. The other two hydro projects also have standardised purchase power agreements with the Ceylon Electricity Board which will expire in 2026.

Sri Lanka Insurance Corporation bought an 8 per cent stake in the company in 2020. Harsha Amarasekera was appointed as the chairman of the company in June 2022 to fill the position vacated upon Dhammika Perera's resignation. Amarasekera is a President's Counsel and was sitting on the board of directors in several quoted companies in Sri Lanka.

== Hydroelectric power stations ==
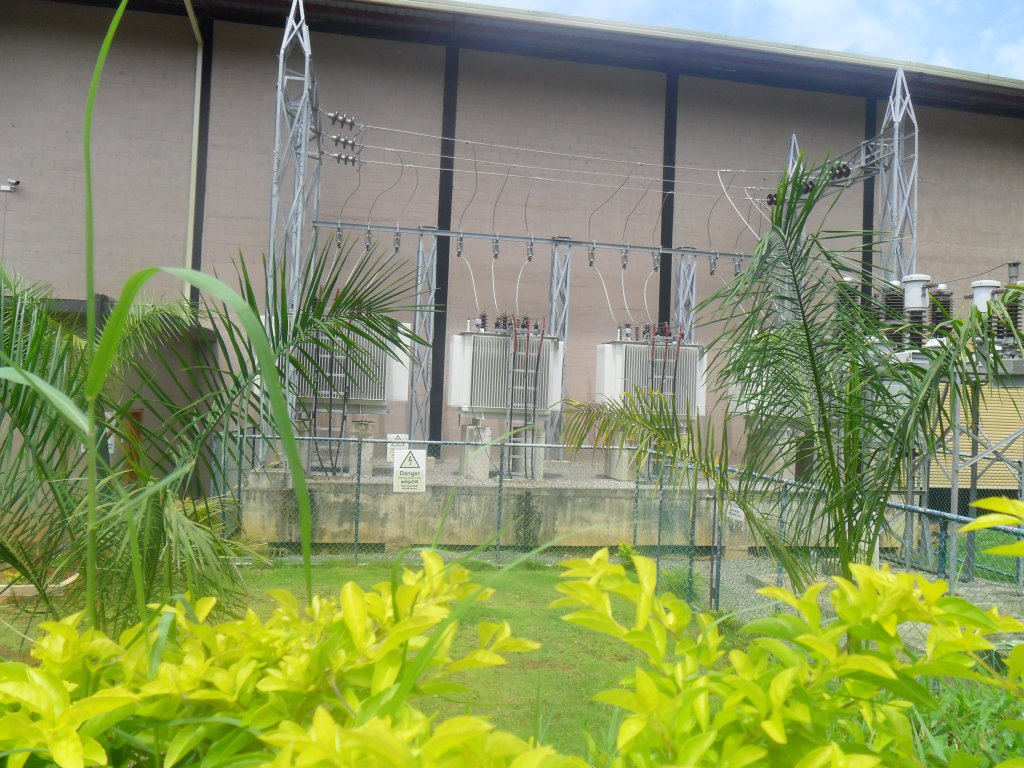
Denawaka Ganga (transformers pictured) and Kiriwaneliya projects were qualified for the Clean Development Mechanism.

| Power station | Capacity (MW) | Location |
|---|---|---|
| Erathna | 9.9 | Kuruwita, Ratnapura District |
| Denawaka Ganga | 7.2 | Malwala, Rathnapura District |
| Kiriwaneliya | 4.65 | Norton Bridge, Nuwara Eliya District |

Source: Annual Report 2022/23

== See also ==
- List of companies listed on the Colombo Stock Exchange
