= Mid-Himalayan Watershed Development Project =

The Mid-Himalayan Watershed Development Project (MHWDP) is a 222,951 ha (550,920 acres) land husbandry initiative in Himachal Pradesh, India, that aims by means of green growth and sustainable development to establish a functionally tenable watershed ecosystem. MHWDP has started to reverse several decades of degradation of the natural resource base including forests, has achieved improved agricultural yields and productivity, and has raised rural household incomes. It includes the Himachal Pradesh Reforestation Project (HPRF), the world's largest clean development mechanism (CDM) project.

== Background ==
The Mid-Himalayan Watershed Development Project (MHWDP) is an administrative unit of the Department of Forests of the Government of Himachal Pradesh. MHWDP stakeholders are the Department of Forests, local gram panchayats (GPs), and the World Bank. The project aims to reverse several decades of degradation of the natural resource base and improve the productive potential and incomes of the rural households in the project areas. Using a community-driven development approach, MHWDP aims to improve water harvesting, increase the area under irrigation to diversify agriculture and horticulture, and conserve and sustainably develop soil and water resources.

MHWDP covers 222,951 ha in the watersheds of Mid-Himalayan region in the Siwalik Hills between 600 and 1800 metres above mean sea level. It encompasses the catchment areas for three major rivers of Northern India, the Ravi, Beas and Sutlej. These rivers join the Indus, which carries water that sustains more than 200 million people. The project covers 11 watershed divisions and involves 704 gram panchayats located in 43 blocks spread over 10 districts of the state.

MHWDP manages a subproject, the Himachal Pradesh Reforestation Project (HPRP), also called the HP Bio-Carbon Reforestation Project-Improving Livelihoods and Watersheds. HPRP implements Afforestation and Reforestation Clean Development Mechanism (A/R CDM) activities, initially on 4,003.07 ha but subsequently expanded to approximately 10,000 ha of degraded lands. MHWDP will manage HPRP until 2013 or beyond. The State Forest Department will subsequently manage the project. HPRP was registered with the UNFCCC 30 Jun 2011 (or whenever...)

== Overview ==
The natural habitats of Himachal Pradesh exhibit a high degree of endemism, referring to species only found in these areas. Watershed management aims at multifaceted environmental benefits such as habitats for biodiversity, soil conservation, reduced sedimentation, and improved forest cover.

The forests of the Himachal Pradesh watersheds are an important carbon sink for greenhouse gases. Trees naturally sequester carbon dioxide, contributing about 90% of the earth's surface carbon storage. A cubic foot of merchantable wood retains approximately 15 kg of carbon. The UN recognised carbon trading as mitigating greenhouse gas emissions. The approximate international market value of one tonne of carbon is US$19.

Himachal Pradesh endeavors to become the first carbon-neutral state in India. The A/R CDM project is developed under the umbrella of the World Bank funded MHWD Project and it expected to sequester 828,016 units tCO2-e of Certified Emission Reductions (tCER) commonly known as carbon credits, each unit being equivalent to the reduction of one tonne of CO_{2}e, e.g. CO_{2} or its equivalent),

over the first crediting period of 20-years at the rate of 10.34 tCO2-e/ha/year.

- India's first clean development mechanism (CDM) project
- carbon emissions will be reduced by 40,000 tonnes per year for a 20-year crediting period from the year 2006.
- can be extended to total 60 years
- project is registered for carbon credits by the UN under which the World Bank will buy carbon credits from the new forests/ plantations being developed on degraded areas in 177 gram panchayats covering around 4,000 hectare land falling in 10 districts of the state.
- impact an area of 4,003.07 hectares
- largest project of its kind in the world,
- strong incentive to protect forest cover in the area.

expand : [Carbon dioxide equivalent] The carbon revenues were calculated at US$5 per tonne of carbon dioxide accumulated in tree biomass, above as well as under the ground. This equates to approximately Rs 2,500 per hectare, depending on growth of trees and other factors.

== Accountability ==
Emphasis was given to assuring transparency and accountability of governmental oversight and project decision making. To facilitate broad participation ownership of the program, the Himachal Pradesh government conducted consultations with key stakeholders, and also chartered the World Wildlife Fund to independently assess and report on stakeholder views. Velander analyzed the MHWDP model, which implements project goals and objectives through the pre-existent local governments, the Gram Panchayats.

== Achievements ==
MHWDP has enabled over 200 km of irrigation channels as well as over 6,000 water harvesting tanks, over 1,000 ponds, nearly 300 dams and over 260 lift or gravity irrigation schemes, and has converted about 9,000 hectares of rain-fed land into irrigated acreage, benefiting some 100,000 families. Scaling up vermicomposting and other sustainable agriculture practices increases the organic matter content of the soil, and the enhanced water retention capacity facilitates sustainable and productive agriculture.

At mid-term review in November, 2009, the project had already surpassed its end-of-project target of 50 per cent increased agricultural yield, achieving increased paddy (236 percent), maize (163 per cent), wheat (90 per cent), and milk yields (11 percent). Approximately 10,000 farmers had modified their cultivation and marketing approaches, including adopting higher value crops such as vegetables and spices. 1,500 farmers were grouped into milk federations connected to milk chilling plants. Overall household incomes had risen 13 percent, largely on account of project extension services, particularly improved agricultural production technologies and market linkages.

Other states in India are looking to replicate the Himachal carbon credit project. It has seen as a potential showcase for other countries in South Asia. "...After getting the Mid-Himalayan Watershed Development Project registered with the United Nations Framework Convention on Climate Change (UNFCCC), Himachal Pradesh has become the first state in India to implement the clean development mechanism (CDM) project. Under the project, world’s largest..." Expand based on

== Financing ==
The World Bank and Himachal Pradesh state government project is financed by a credit from the International Development Association (IDA), the World Bank's concessionary lending arm. International Bank for Reconstruction and Development (IBRD) is acting as trustee for BioCarbon Fund (BioCF) DNA Spain is the source of funding to IDA. The green development loan is for US$200 million. The loan agreement was signed between the World Bank and the state government in New Delhi on 28 July 2012. Funding consists of a 90 per cent grant and a 10 per cent loan at interest rate of 0.7 per cent (payable in 30 years).

Although only 1 of 76 projects and just US$200 million of World Bank's US$23 billion portfolio in India, HPRF is the world's largest and India's first clean development mechanism (CDM) project. The United Nations has registered MHWDP for carbon trading scheme under the United Nations Framework Convention on Climate Change. The bank will buy carbon credits from the new forests being developed. The loan program breaks new ground and has the potential for significant demonstration effects in promoting the green growth agenda.

WB project to cover 102 more villages

Externally Aided Projects in Himachal Pradesh

The project got approval on 6 September 2012 and the proposed closing date of this project is 30 September 2013.
