= Program of Activities =

Program

Program of Activities (PoA) is a modality of project development under the Clean Development Mechanism (CDM) of the United Nations Framework Convention on Climate Change (UNFCCC).

== The rationale ==
The aim of PoAs was to allow replicable projects with low and physically spread greenhouse gas reductions into the CDM. This type of project is often linked to higher sustainability benefits, but are too small to pay back the transaction cost involved in the CDM process. It was expected to allow African countries a higher participation in the CDM in particular.

== Historical background ==
The PoA idea originated from a decision made at the December 2005 Conference of the Parties/Meeting of the Parties in Bonn, Germany where it was decided that local/regional and national policies or standards cannot be considered as CDM project activities, but project activities under a PoA can be registered as a single CDM project activity. By its thirty-sixth meeting (November 2007), the CDM Executive Board approved the official templates for Project Design Documents suitable for Programme of Activities (titled PoA-DD), its constituent activities (CPA-DD), and issued procedures to register PoAs and issue CERs. It also amended small-scale CDM methodologies to make them suitable for programmatic activities. By its forty-seventh meeting (May 2009), an improved version of PoAs guidance was published. The new guidance, along with a grace period that allowed retroactive PoAs to be submitted before 31 December 2009, had allowed more submission of PoAs to the EB, which rose to around 40 by the end of 2009. As of November 2010, after the 57th meeting of the CDM Executive Board, a total of 54 PoAs were under validation and 5 were registered.

== Current structure ==
The classical structure of CDM uses a project-by-project process for registering and verifying projects. This approach involves very high transaction costs, a long time to market, and a high risk of non-registration. It is also very difficult to implement such a process in least developed countries and small island states where average project sizes and the scale of national markets tend to be smaller, so relative transaction costs are higher. In order to reduce transaction costs in CDM and expand the mechanism's applicability to micro project activities, the CDM Executive Board launched the Programme of Activities modality. Under this modality, a PoA Coordinating/Managing Entity (CME), which can be (for examples) a government agency, NGO or business, develops a PoA which defines broad parameters for project activities (referred to as CDM Programme Activities or CPAs) that are eligible for inclusion in the PoA. Whereas stand-alone CDM projects must be approved individually by the CDM Executive Board, a PoA needs to be registered only once by the CDM Executive Board. After that, it can include an unlimited and unspecified number of individual CPAs without recourse to the CDM Executive Board.

== Examples ==
Projects that distribute compact fluorescent lamps, efficient cook-stoves, Building refurbishment or solar water heaters, are some examples where PoAs, as defined by CDM, can be used. The modality is also applicable for larger scale activities such as small hydro power plants or composting.

== Advantages, criticism ==
Projects conducted using PoA offer several advantages over alternative prevailing project-based approaches:

- Individual CPAs have a drastically shorter time to market for project operators who wish to secure CER revenues since the inclusion of CPAs in a registered PoA no longer require approval from the CDM Executive Board in Bonn.
- Adding CPAs leads to substantially lower transaction costs that stand-alone CDM projects because the registration and verification processes for CPAs are streamlined.
- Full scalability: In contrast to a standard CDM project, a PoA does not need to define beforehand the scale and location of each project activity.
- Opportunities to convert future carbon revenues into upfront carbon finance by reducing the risk of nonregistration and shortening the lag before CDM income is realized. This point is particularly important, as this can improve the factual additionality of CDM projects, by making carbon-related revenues tangible at the point of financial closure.

Projects utilizing PoA may also have several disadvantages over projects utilizing the prevailing, project-based approaches:

- Higher transaction cost for the initial registration of the PoA and first CPA
- Longer time to initial registration for the initial PoA and first CPA
- Unsolved Designated Operational Entity (DOE) Liability issue on CPA level

=== DOE liability ===
In a PoA, the DOE is given the ability to decide whether or not to include a CPA within the PoA. This responsibility transfer from the CDM Executive Board to the DOE has not been conceded without any guarantees taken by the executive board. To avoid wrong inclusion of CPAs within the PoA, the Board has prepared a set of rules that allows the DNA (Designated National Authority) or the executive board itself to challenge the decisions from the DOE. Other characteristics are:

- The process of erroneous inclusion can be launched if there is a suspicion that a CPA does not meet the eligibility criteria.
- A single EB member or the DNA can request the initiation of a process for erroneous inclusion.
- The process for review of erroneous inclusion of a CPA can be initiated throughout the entire lifetime of a CPA
- If the EB determines that a CPA has been erroneously included then all issued CERs from this erroneous CPA must be transferred by the DOE.
- The process of erroneous inclusion can be extended to other CPAs

The DOE liability as currently framed is considered inoperable for the following reasons:

- A CPA can be put under review at any time, even many years after its inclusion into the PoA.
- It is also not clear what constitutes an erroneous inclusion. It can be anything, from wrong coordinates to severe DOE misconduct or fraudulent information.
- Under current rules a DOE could be liable for returning many years of issued CERs that would have to be obtained at a market price that could be vastly higher than current prices.

Many PoAs that are currently in validation have been launched in anticipation that the issue of DOE liability would be resolved, as also requested by CMP5. If the corresponding rules are not reformed then many of these PoAs will not be viable since DOEs will either be unable to include CPAs or the DOE fees charged will be too high. As a consequence, DOE liability has not contributed to make PoAs popular among DOEs. Many DOEs are unwilling to validate PoAs and reluctant to include new CPAs. To date, only one PoA has managed to perform CPA inclusion (PoA 2767).

== PoA pipeline ==
Out of 59 PoAs, 9 are located in Africa (15%), 1 in the Middle-East (2%), 38 in Asia (64%) and 9 in Latin America (19%). If at first sight the centre of gravity of PoAs activity remains in Asia, the unevenness between Asia and the rest of the world is not as strong as it is for CDM.
