= Erathna Mini Hydro Power Project =

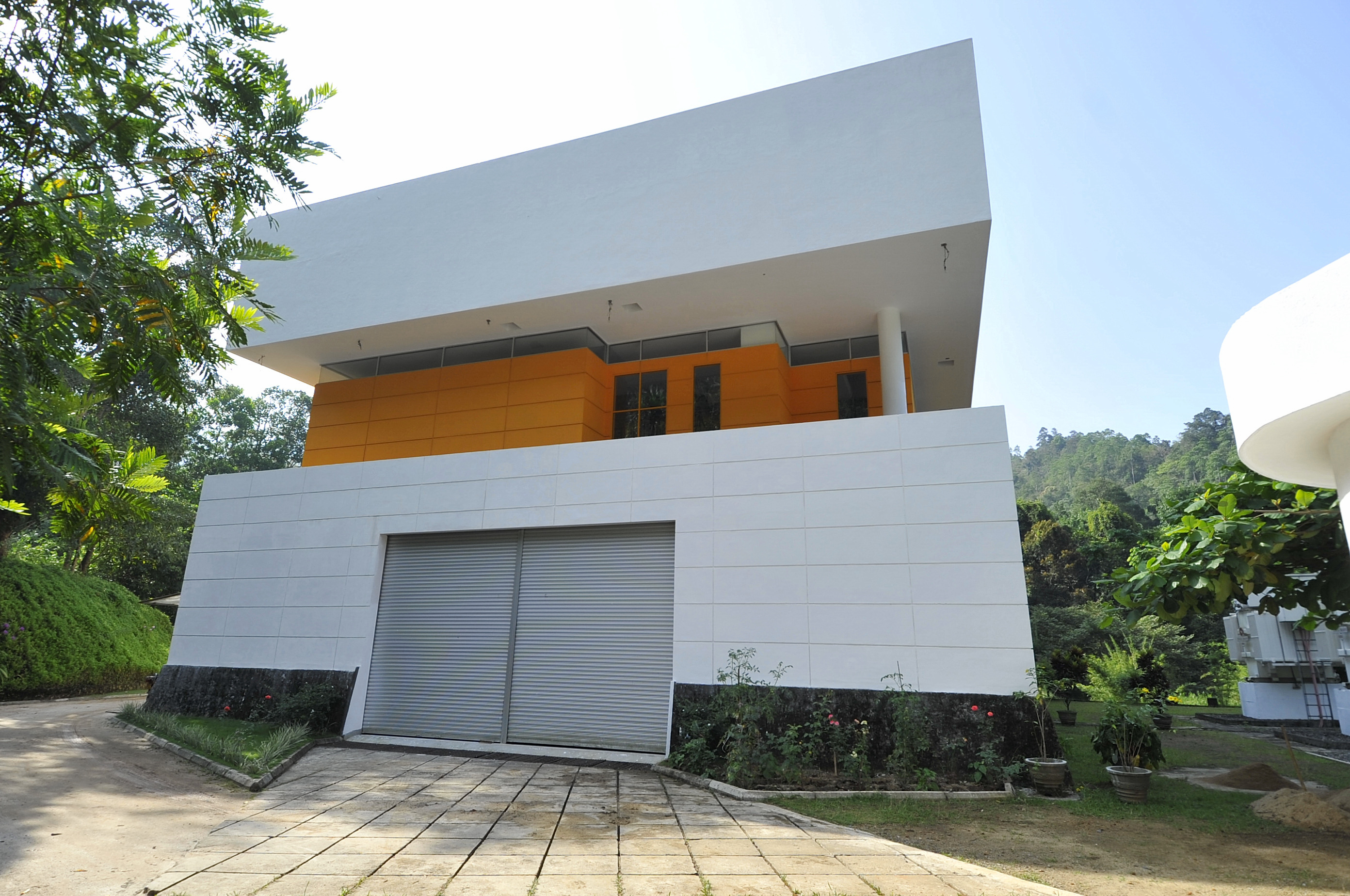
- Interactive map of Erathna Mini Hydro Power Project
- Country: Sri Lanka
- Location: Ratnapura, Sabaragamuwa Province
- Coordinates: 06°49′36″N 80°26′29″E
- Purpose: Power
- Status: Operational
- Construction began: September 2001
- Opening date: July 2004
- Owner: Vallibel Power Erathna PLC

Power Station
- Type: run of the river
- Installed capacity: 10 MW
- Annual generation: 40 GWh

The Erathna Mini Hydro Power Project is one of the run of river mini hydro power projects in Sri Lanka which has the install capacity of 10 MW. The project is located on the Kuru Ganga, a tributary of the Kalu Ganga (Black River).

== Introduction ==
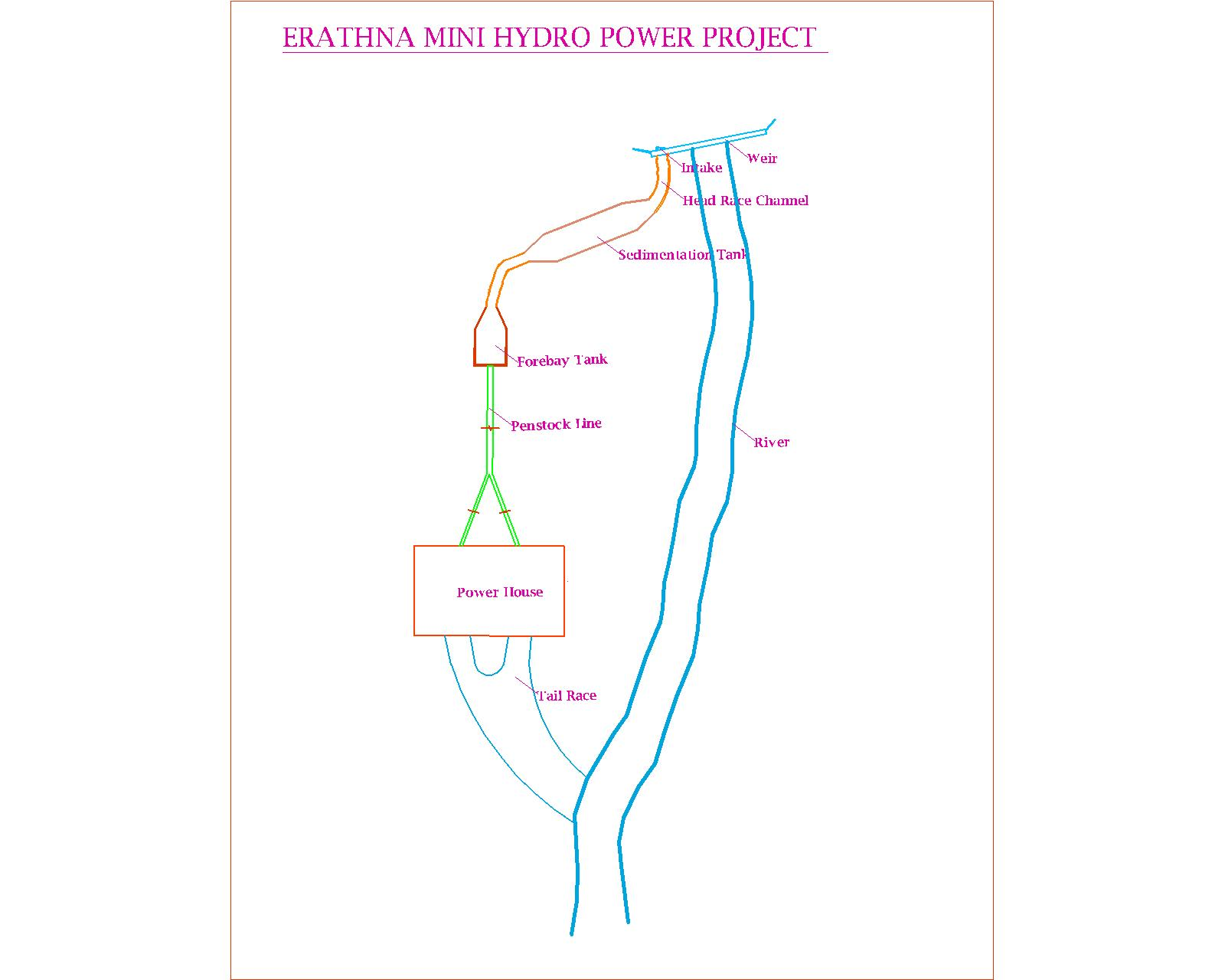
Sketch of the Power Plant

The developer of the project is Vallibel Power Erathna PLC and the project is developed on a build, own and operate basis. The intention of the company is to generate 40 GWh of green energy annually and to export it to the national electricity grid of the Ceylon Electricity Board which is the only authorised Institute for electricity transmission in Sri Lanka, controlling the all major functions of electricity generation, transmission, distribution and retailing in the country.

The project consists of weir, intake, headrace channel, sedimentation tank, forebay, penstock, powerhouse and transmission system.

== Location ==
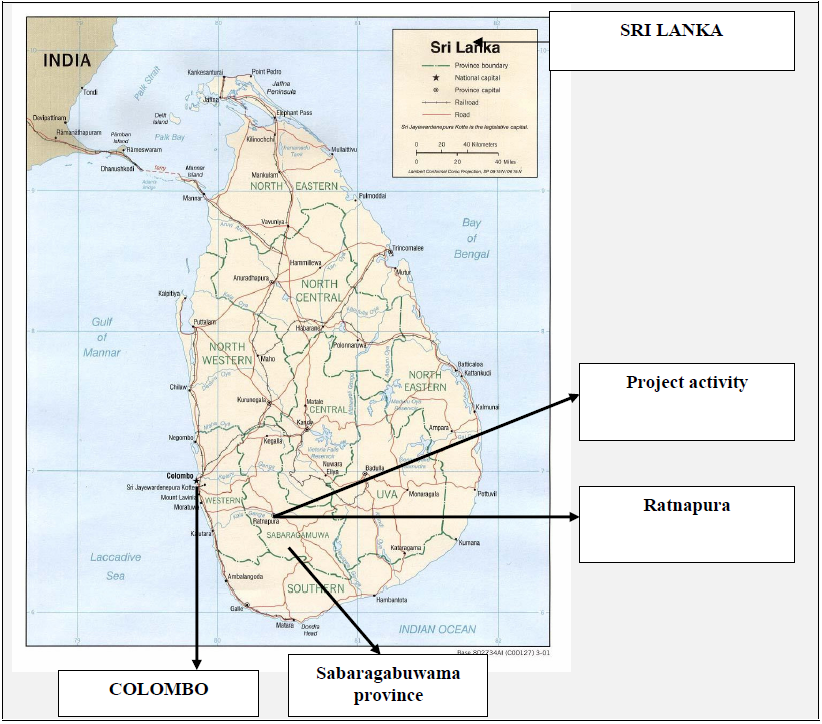
Location of the Power Plant

The catchment of this project is 14.5 km2 and the design flow is 2.7 m3/s. The catchment falls within the peak wilds and is considered a natural reserve. Topography surveys of the project area are available in sheet 68 – Nuwara Eliya which is on a scale of 1:50,000 by the Survey Department of Sri Lanka. Sheet 61/16, 1:10,000 is also used for the initial conceptual development of the project. The Geo Coordinates of the project activity is 6° 49’36” N, 80° 26’ 29” E.

Kuru Ganga leaves the peak wilderness sanctuary at an elevation of 1030 m AMSL and flows steeply westwards until it reaches the village of Adavikanda at an elevation of 400 m AMSL. Close to the pilgrim's rest called “Maha Ambalama” forms the “Manna-Kethi” falls from elevation 860 m to 840 m. Thereafter flows on steeply exposed bedrock to an elevation of 600 m. The riverbed below this level is covered with large boulders and banks with thick vegetation.

== Project implementation ==
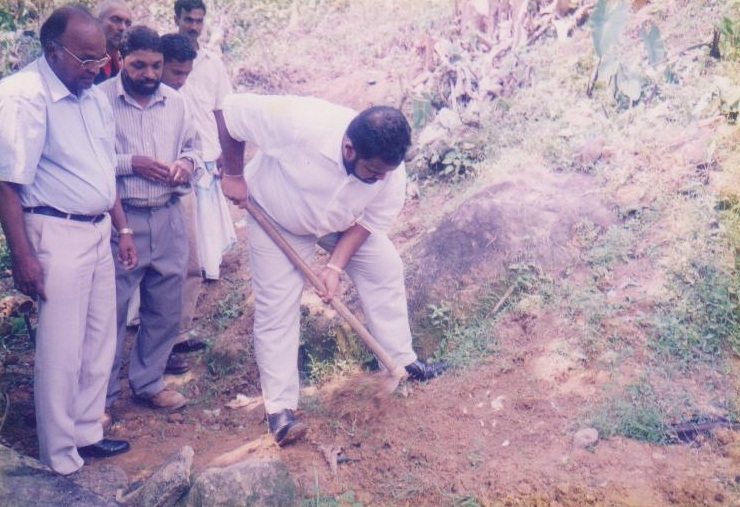
Traditional Groundbreaking Ceremony (Chairman of Vallibel Group; Dhammika Perera)

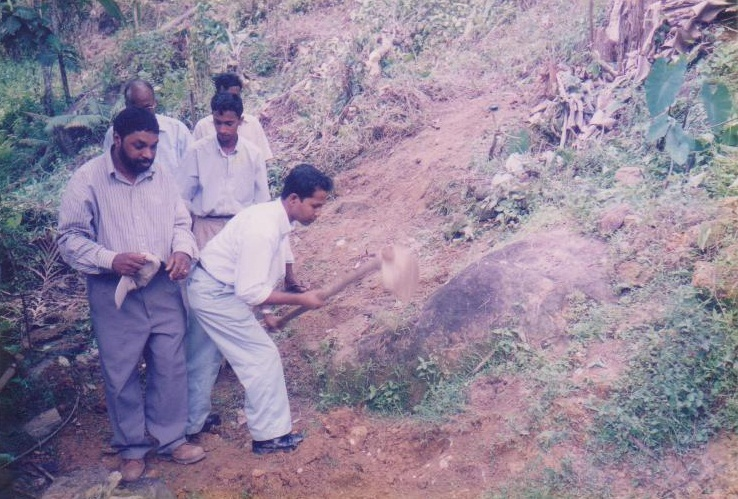
Traditional Groundbreaking Ceremony (Jt. Chief Executive Officer; Aruna Dheerasinghe)

The project is owned and operated by Vallibel Power Erathna PLC, which is the largest public quoted mini hydropower company in Sri Lanka. 5 MW hydropower potential was identified at the aforesaid location at Erathna and a feasibility studying process was initiated under the name of Zyrex Power Company Erathna Limited. Then the ownership of the company was changed to Vallibel Group of Companies. Then the project capacity was enhanced up to 10 MW with the identification of the higher hydropower potential by the Vallibel Group. Later, the name of the company changed to Vallibel Power Erathna PLC.

The project developer, Vallibel Power Erathna PLC itself carried out the construction work. Some of the contracts were awarded to third parties on the basis of labour contracts. Project Management was done by the Vallibel group.

Construction of the power plant commenced in September 2001 with the traditional groundbreaking ceremony.

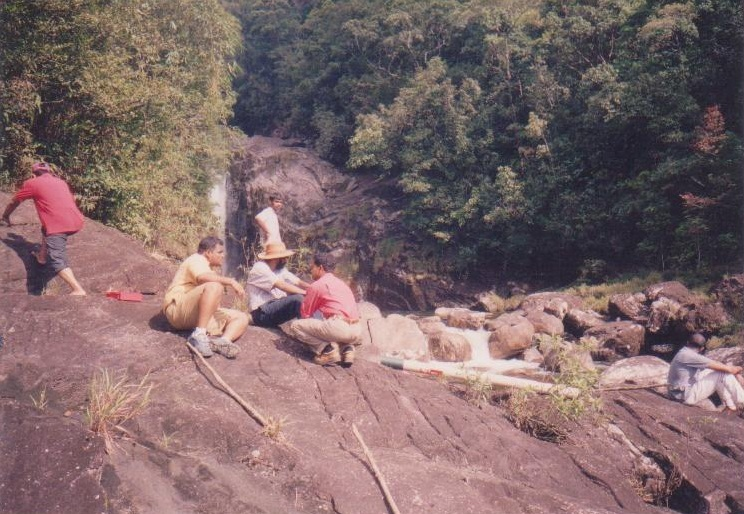
Inspection Visits at Initial Stage for Design Purposes (Dhammika Perera, Aruna Dheerasinghe, and Mr Seram are in the photo)

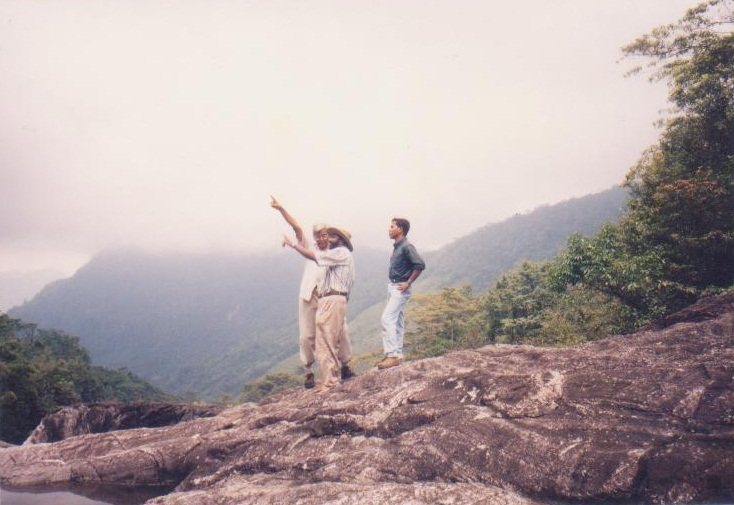
Inspection Visits at Initial Stage for Design Purposes (P.S.P.S. De Saram, G.G. Jayawardhana, Aruna Dheerasinghe, are in the photo)

=== Access road ===
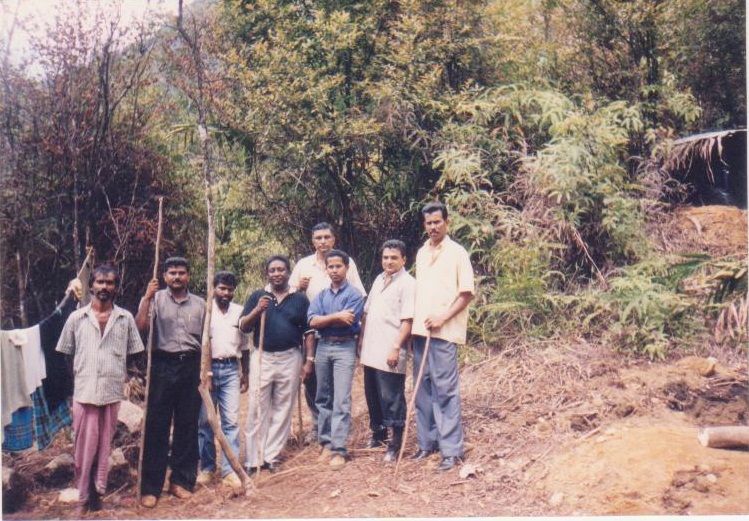
Inspection Visits at Initial Stage (Nihal Karunarathna, Mr Suraweera, Mr Aththnayaka, Mr Aruna Dheerasinghe, are in the photo)

In order to facilitate the project and the other operational and maintenance purposes, a 3.5 km-long new access road was built from the powerhouse location to the forebay location. The access road starts from Adavikanda where the powerhouse is built-up. The endpoint is Warangala; the forebay location. By the construction of the access road, the requirement of accessing the weir, penstock path, forebay and channel was fulfilled. Since the path is along the part of a highland complex of the country and 3.5 km long path climbs an elevation of 460 m, it consists of steep valleys, rock cliffs, boulders and boulder trains. And also slope directions and slope angles vary considerably from place to place due to the inherent nature of the area. Therefore, it was a hard task to complete the access road and the construction took a period of 8 months.

With the access road implementation, nearby existing roads were rehabilitated by the company for upgrading the community's wellbeing. Although the construction work is done, the company managed to make less environmental impact. Because instead of removing vegetation within the construction site, a lot of trees were planted by carrying out continuous tree planting programs.

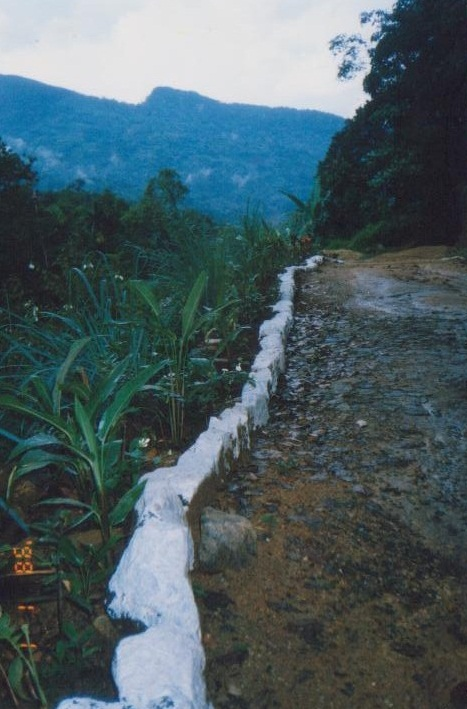
Newly Planted Trees

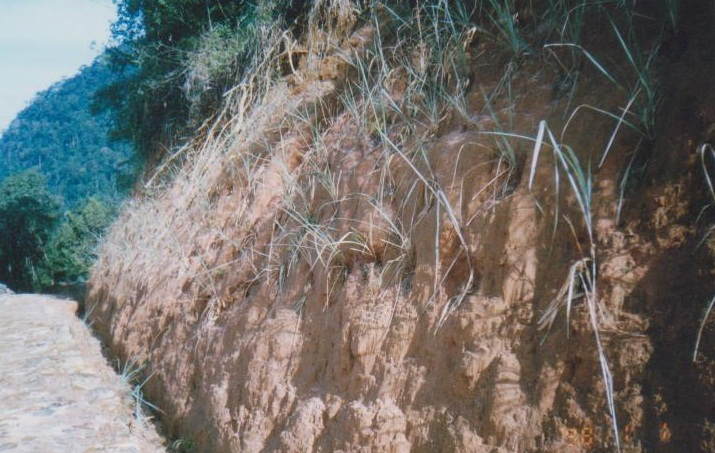
Newly Planted Trees

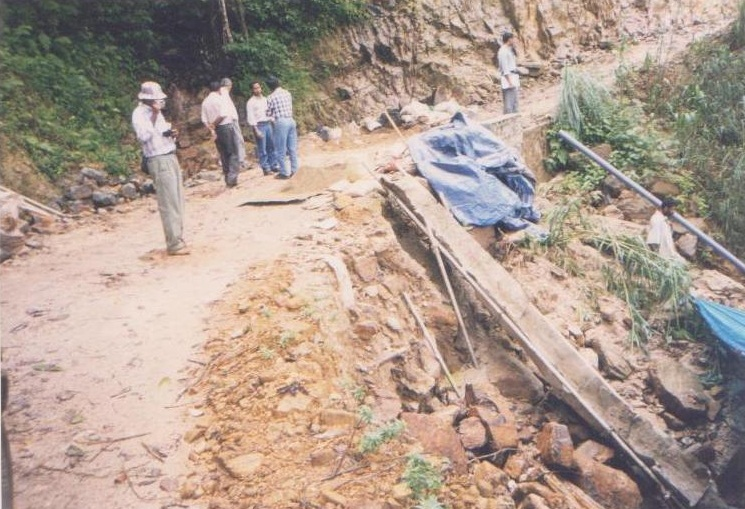
Access Road Construction (Mr Saram, Mr Suraweera, Mr Dheerasinghe, Mr Gunasekara and Mr Jayawardhana are in the photo)

=== Weir ===
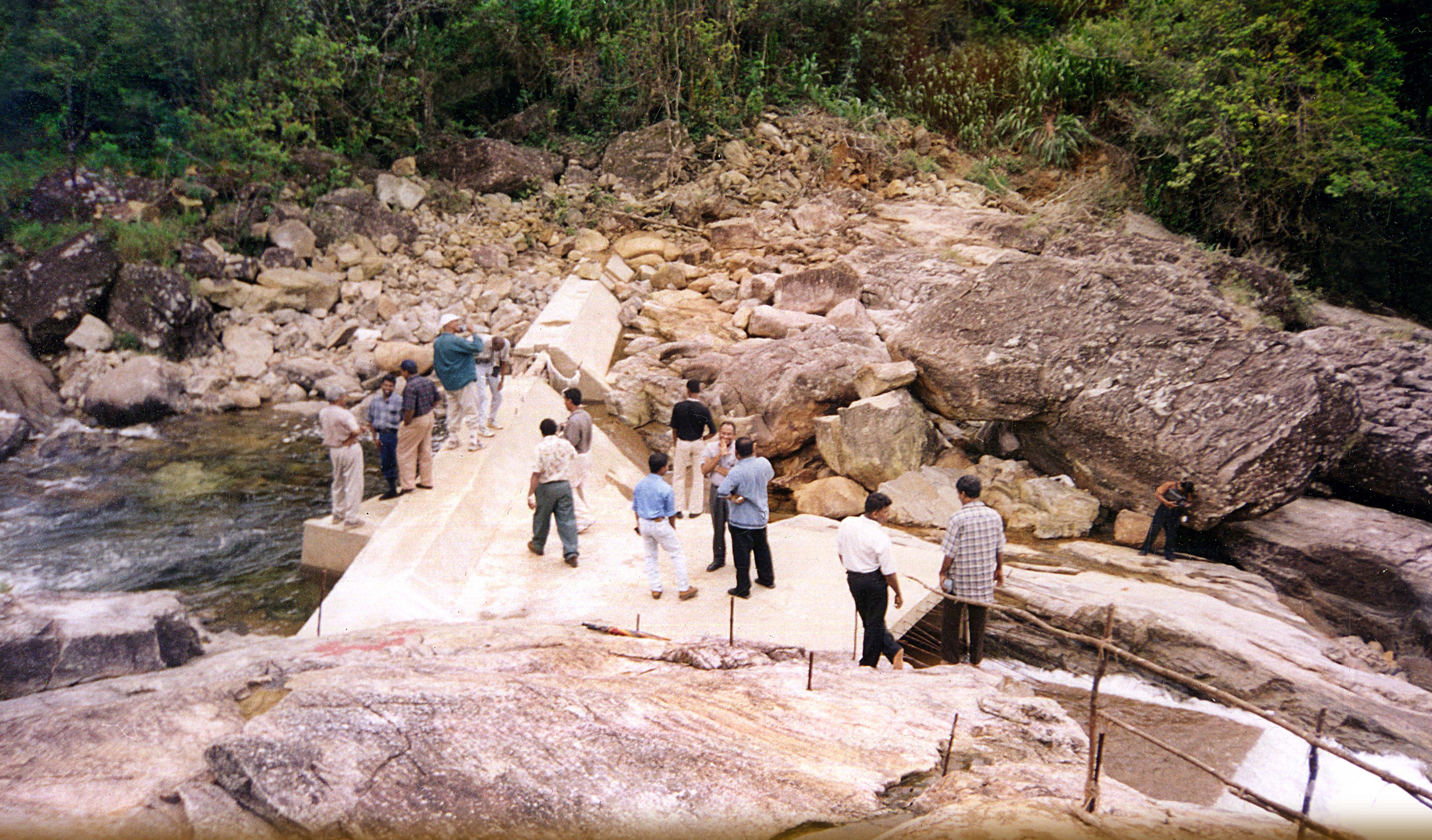
Inspection of Weir Construction (Dhammika Perera, Mr Saram, Mr Dheerasinghe, and Mr Jayawardhana are in the photo)

To optimise the plant design, the actual flow measurements should have been taken immediately. Therefore, the weir construction was started parallel to the construction of the access road and constructed weir was used to measure the river flow.

Since motorable access was not available at that time, labourers climbed with all materials such as sand, metal, cement, steel etc. for a 460 m elevation from the powerhouse location to the weir location.

The weir is located downstream of the Manna-Kethi fall. From the pool, at the base of the fall, another tributary joins from the left bank. As the project is a run-of-river type, no storage is required at the weir. The weir is 20 m long with a maximum height of 2 m. Due to high flood flows, the weir is designed as a concrete gravity structure. Dowels are incorporated for added safety against sliding.

=== Intake ===
The intake is a closed reinforced concrete conduit with a length of 10 m and a cross-section of 2 m x 1 m. There are trash bars spaced at 150 mm to prevent the entry of debris into the channel path. The intake is designed for a maximum flow of 3 m³/s.

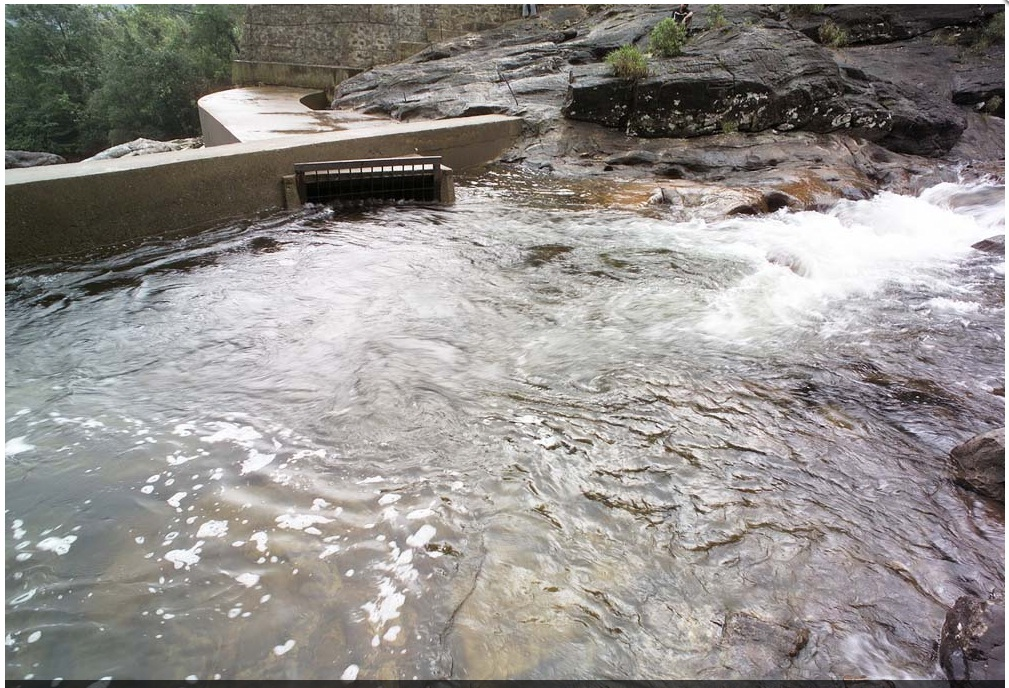
Weir and Intake at Operational Stage

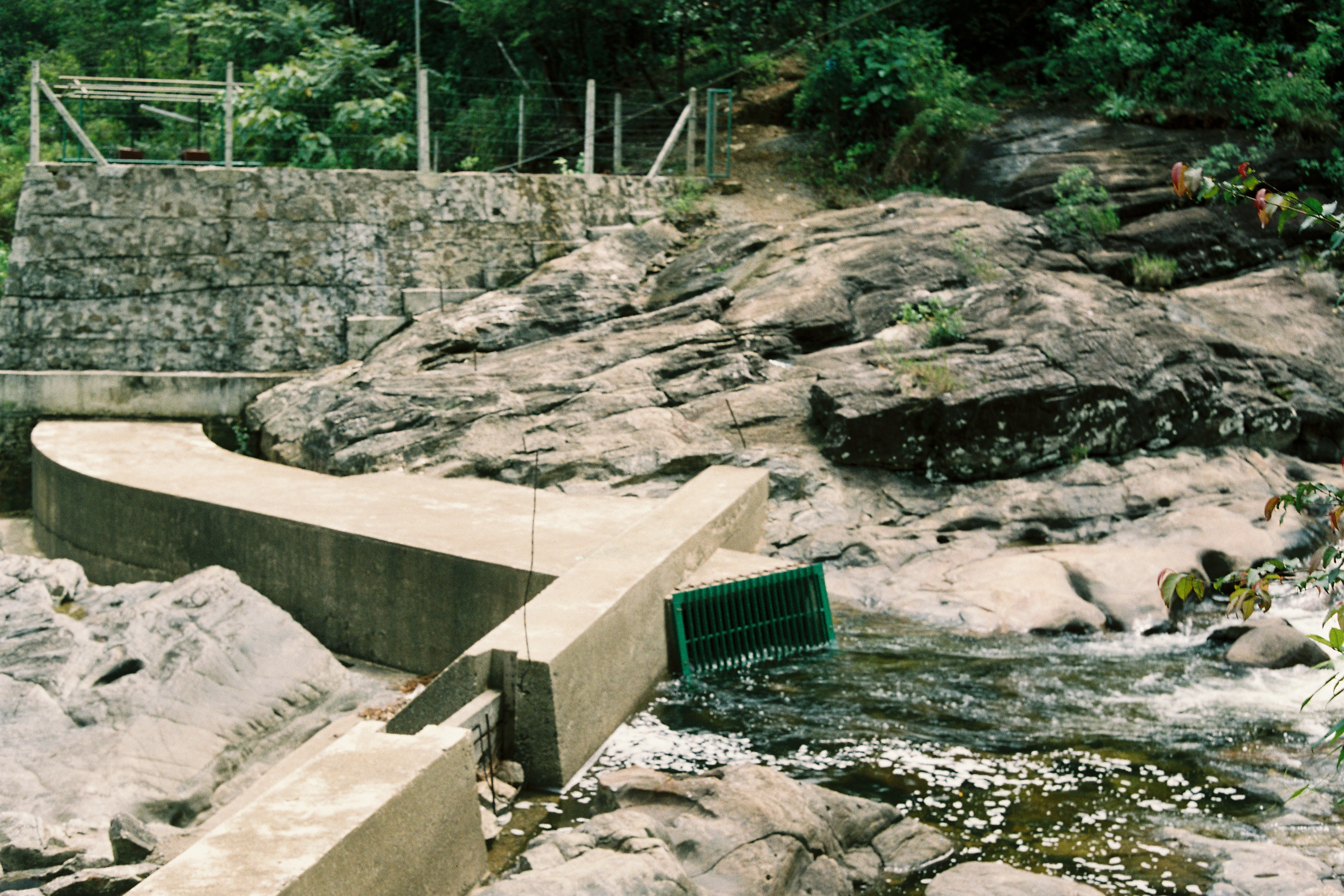
Weir and Intake at Operational Stage

=== Headrace channel ===
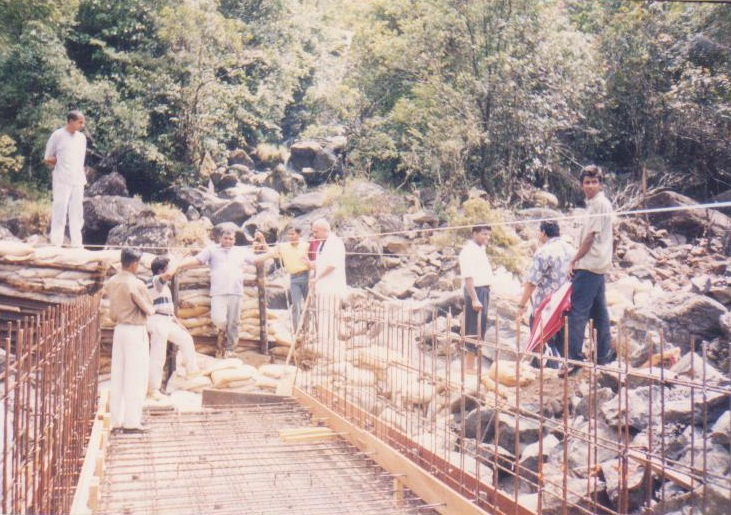
Construction of Channel (Dhammika Perera, Mr Keerthi, and Mr Dheerasinghe, are in the photo)

The initial 20 m of the channel from the intake is a closed conduit built into the right abutment to prevent the entry of floods and to attenuate the flow through the conduit during high flood levels. A side spillway of 10 m long is provided in the open channel built on the rock immediately downstream of the closed conduit to spill the excess water entering at high flood levels. The headrace channel is of reinforced concrete, rectangular in section, 2 m wide and 1.2 m high on the inside based on economic studies. The length of the channel is 280 m and the bed slope is 2.5 in 1000. The channel is located on earth-cut, with crossings over minor streams. The channel is covered for most of its length to prevent the ingress of trash and silt from the hill slope.

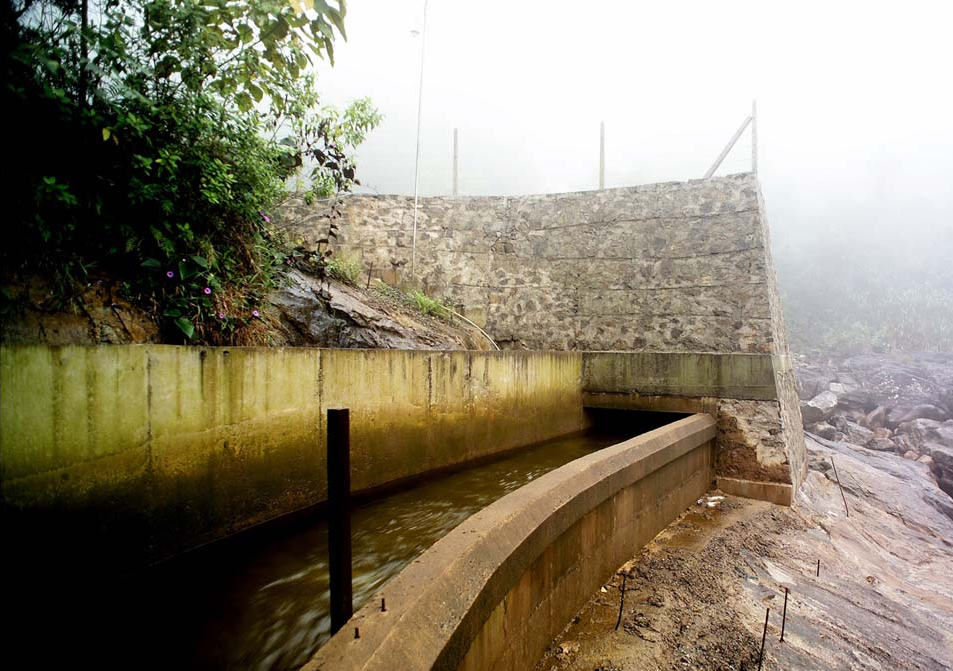
Channel at Operational Stage

=== Sedimentation tank ===
The sedimentation tank is of a conventional design and it settles silt and sand to a particle size of 0.2 mm. A de-silting gate discharges the accumulated silt to a watercourse.

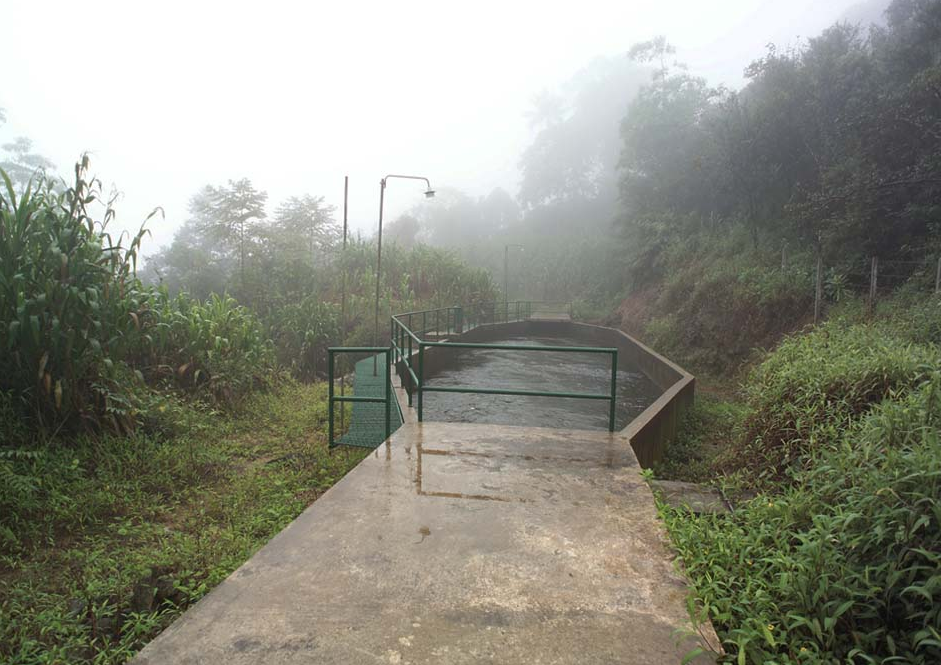
Sedimentation Tank at Operational Stage

=== Forebay ===
The forebay is located on a hill slope of bedrock and it is a reinforced concrete structure. The forebay incorporates a spillway and a trash rack. The forebay spillway is specially designed considering less environmental impacts by directing the water spill to a natural water path and it discharges 3 m³/s. The forebay is designed to have a steady flow to penstock avoiding turbulence and vortex. The elevation of water is maintained automatically with the level sensors with the machine operation.

=== Penstock ===
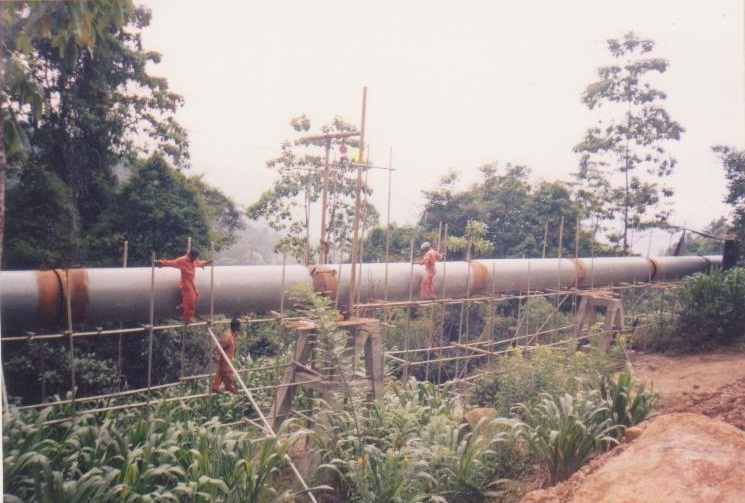
Penstock Installation at Construction Stage

In early 2002, penstock civil works such as anchors and supports are started and penstock installation was initiated in 2003. The penstock is 2400 m long with a drop of 462 m. The upper 1235 m is a single pipe and the rest is twin pipes. The penstock has 33 anchors and supports at 12-metre intervals. The single type penstock reduces its outer diameter from 1118 mm to 1016 mm and thereafter to 914 mm. Just upstream of the 12th anchor the pipe bifurcates into 813 mm pipes. The twin pipes further reduce to 711 mm and then to 620 mm. Before entry to the powerhouse, it reduces to 500 mm to suit the inlet valve diameter.

The penstock has sleeve-type expansion joints downstream of every anchor and the penstock is supported by the piers by saddle supports with a suitable sliding interface. The sleeve-type joint was thought to be the most reliable, durable and maintenance-free joint for such a high-head pipeline. Anchor blocks are reinforced concrete structures with rubble masonry sections to provide additional mass required against sliding.

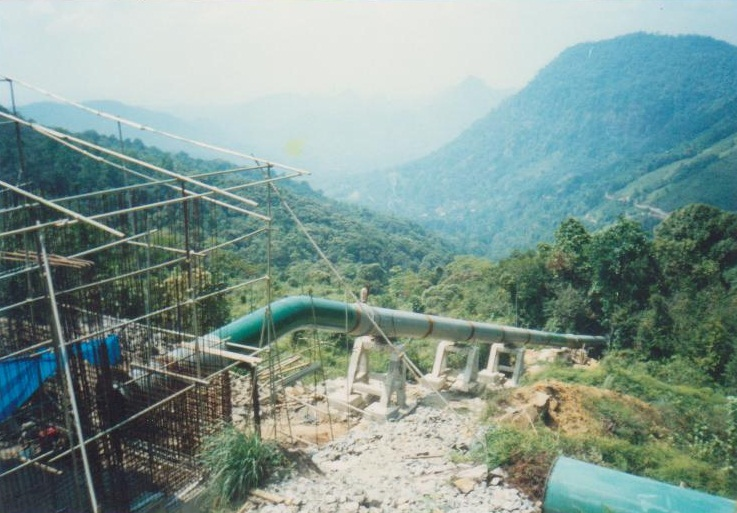
Penstock Installation at Construction Stage

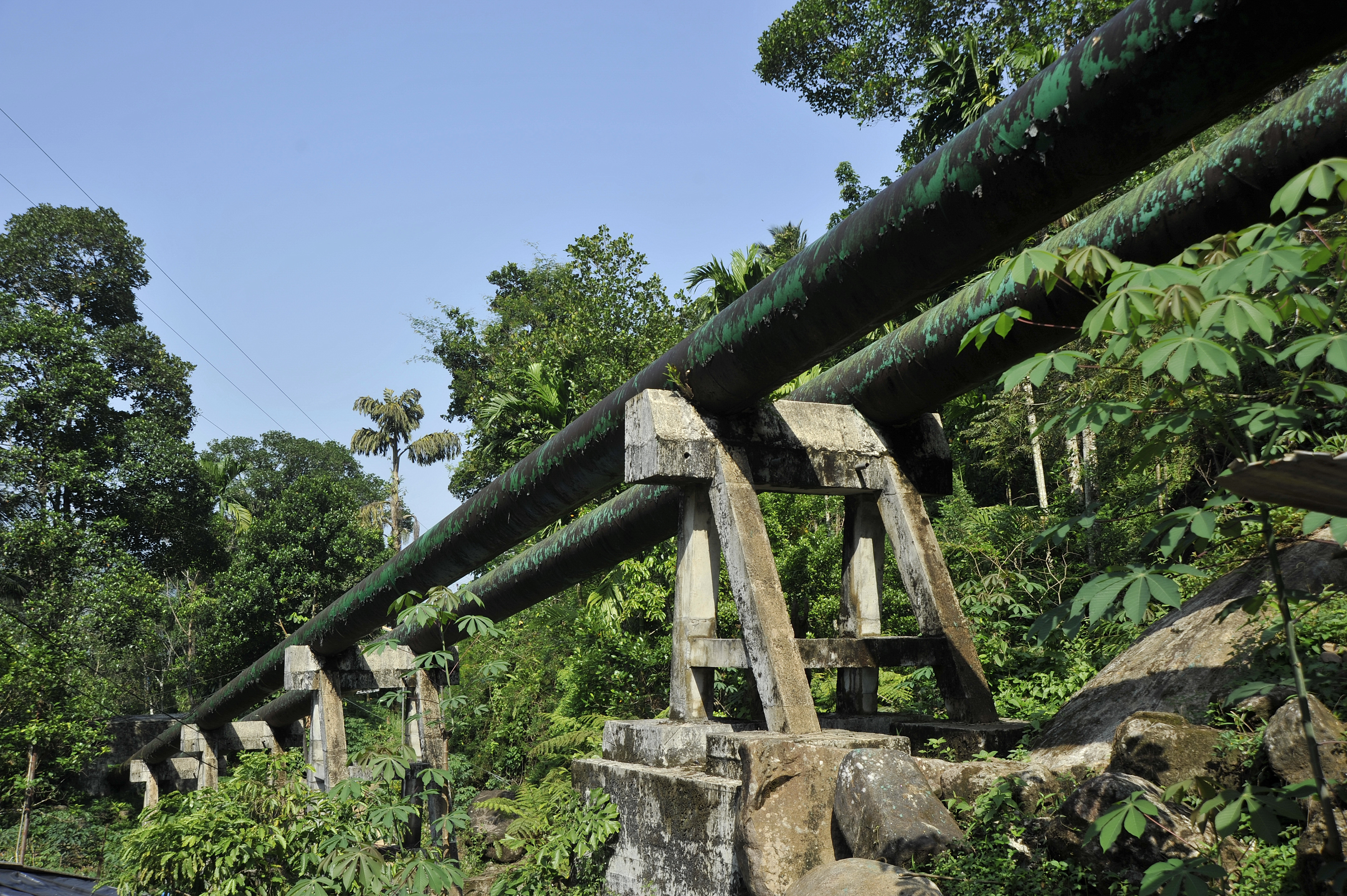
Penstock at Operational Stage

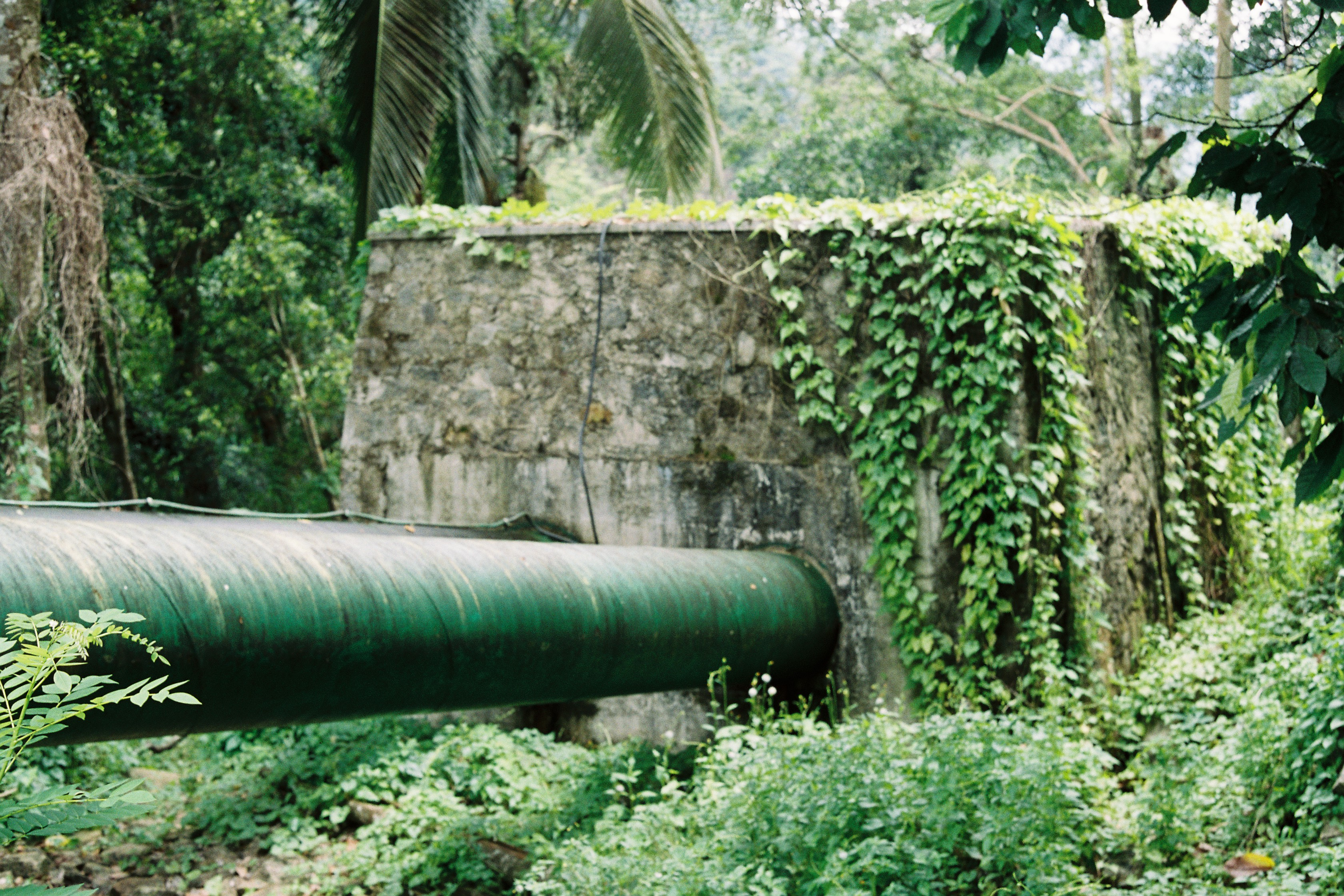
Anchor

=== Powerhouse ===
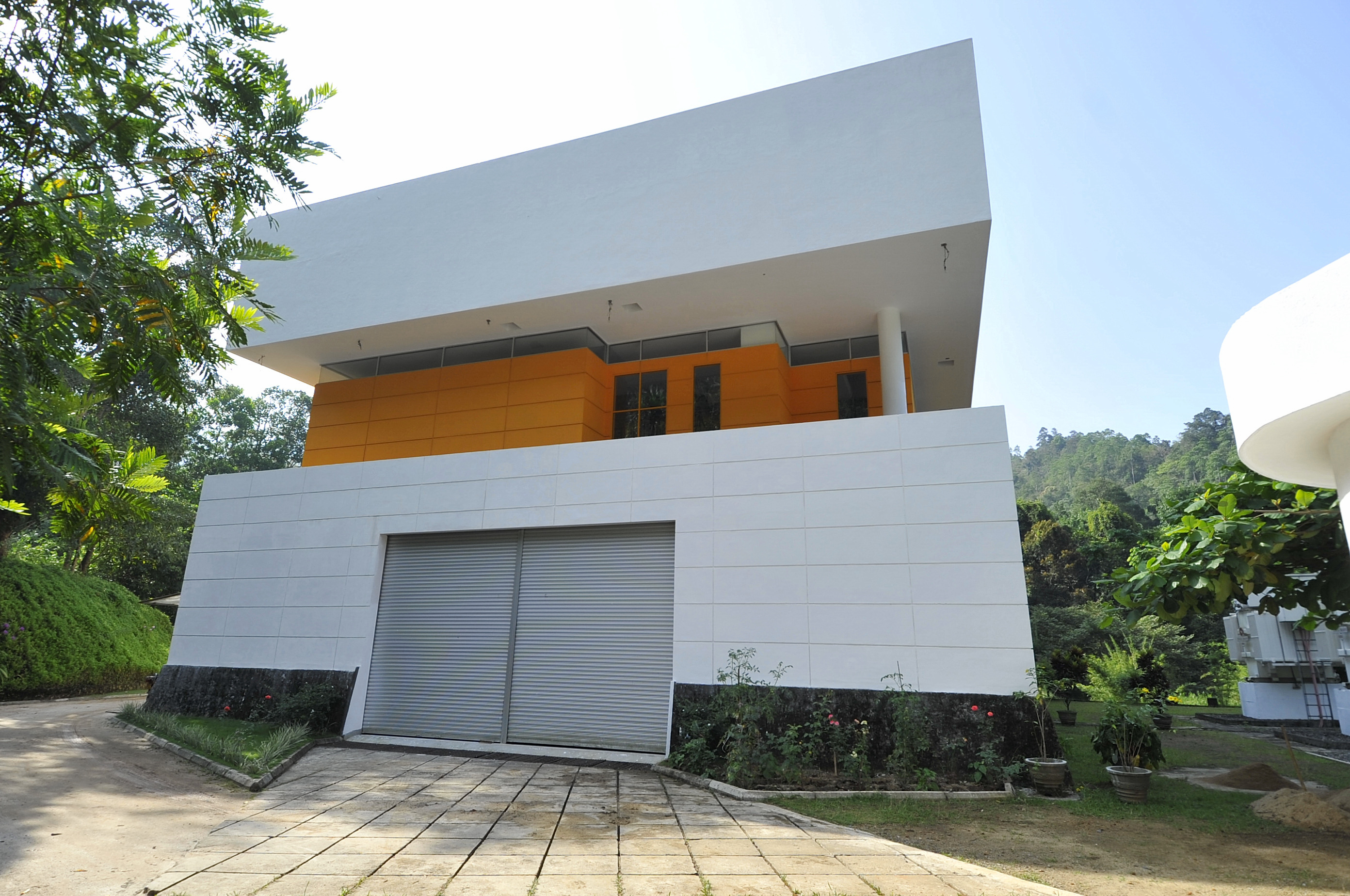
Power House at Operational Stage

The powerhouse is located on the right bank of Kuru Ganga at Adavikanda where the road from Erathna to Adavikanda ends. The powerhouse is a reinforced concrete structure which 18 m wide and 30 m long. The main machine floor served by the overhead crane is only 10.5 metres wide.

The powerhouse has the machine bay, erection bay, inlet valve bay, a control panel bay and a medium voltage room. There is an office room and a record room adjacent to the control panel bay and the powerhouse is specially designed with a public gallery for visitors. The powerhouse superstructure is a reinforced concrete frame with crane beams. The walls are constructed of cement bricks and plastering. Doors and windows are in aluminium and wood. The roof is made of concrete.

The tailrace channel conveys the tailwater back to the river and a part of the tailrace.

The switchyard is located close to the powerhouse and has two generator transformers and the service transformers connecting with the switchgear. The terminal tower of the 33 kV transmission line is located at the end of the switchyard.

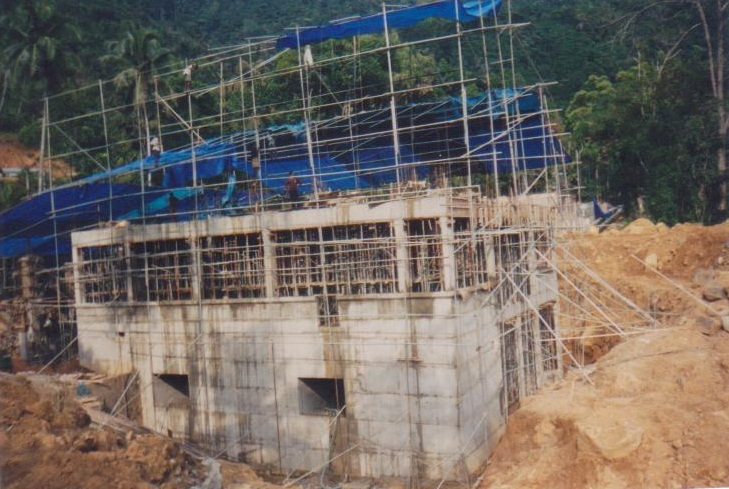
Power House Construction

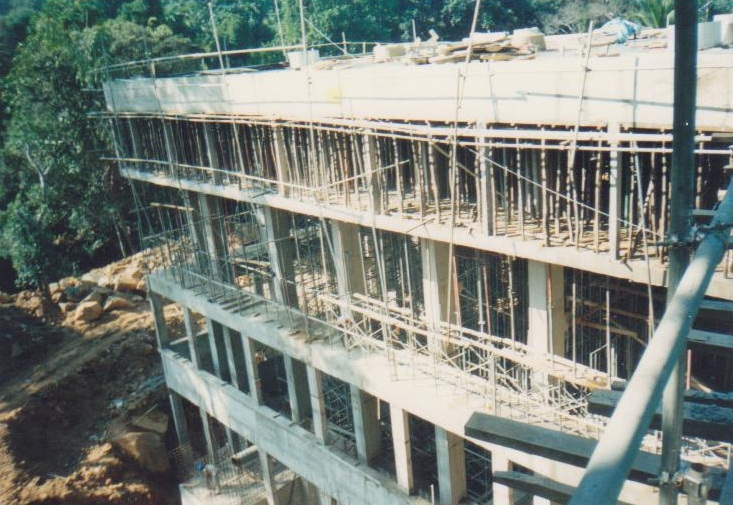
Power House Construction

=== Electro-mechanical equipment ===
The powerhouse has two twin jet Pelton turbines coupled to two generators of 4.95 MW each which are manufactured by Voith Siemens.

The Pelton turbines are horizontal units operating at 750 RPM. The runner buckets are made with integrally cast stainless cast steel. The runner is directly coupled to the generator shaft. Other equipment associated with the turbine are the inlet valve, distributor, power nozzles and needles and the governor and hydraulic systems. The rated voltage of the generators is 6.3 kV. The bearings of the generators are oil lubricated sleeve type and a separate oil lubrication unit is used. Two 6 MVA transformers are used to step up the generator voltage to 33 kV. These transformers are the outdoor type. A 50 kVA transformer operating at 400 V is used for station supply.

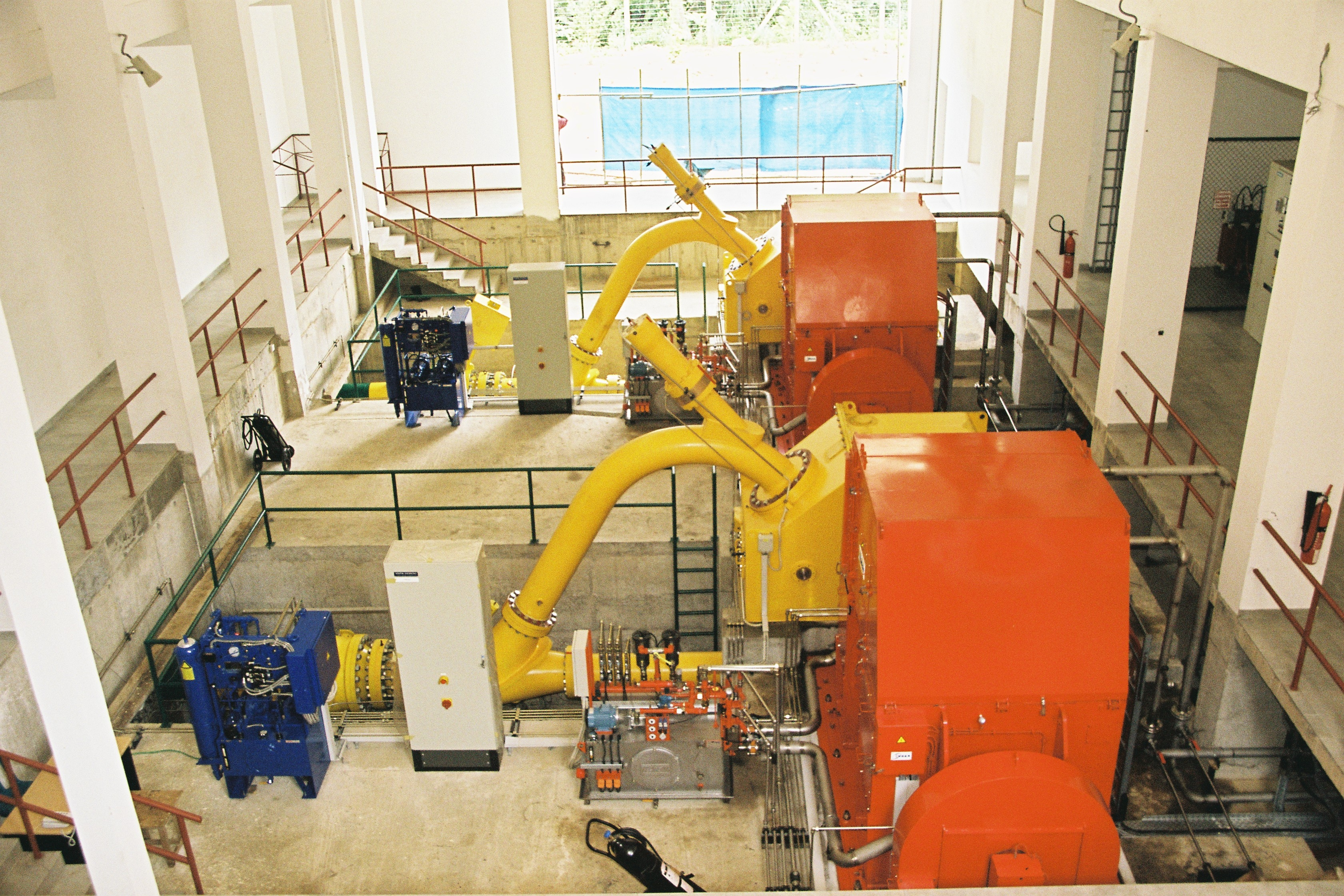
Turbines and Generators

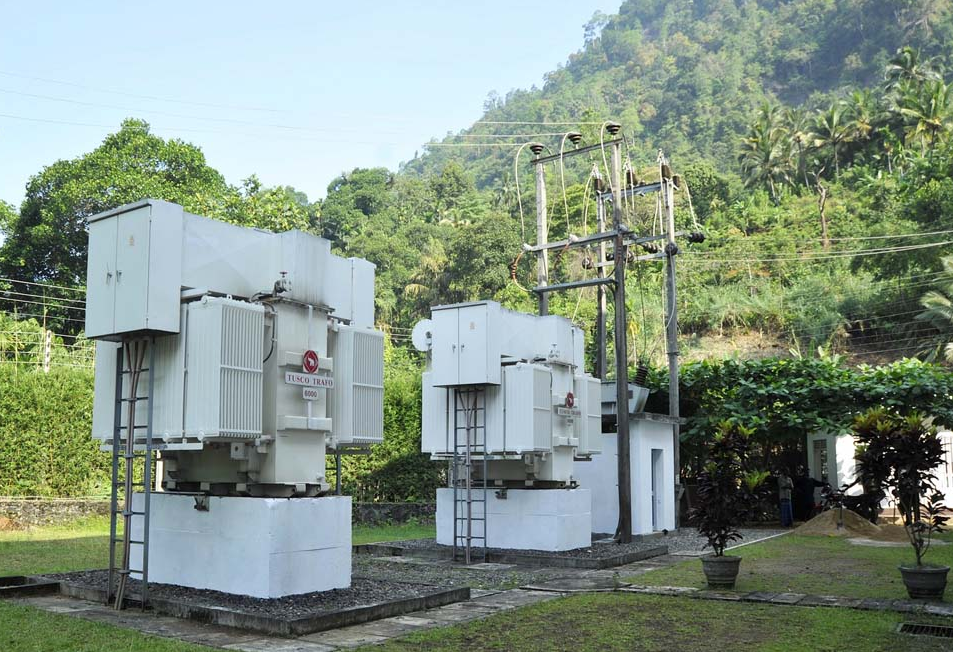
Transformers

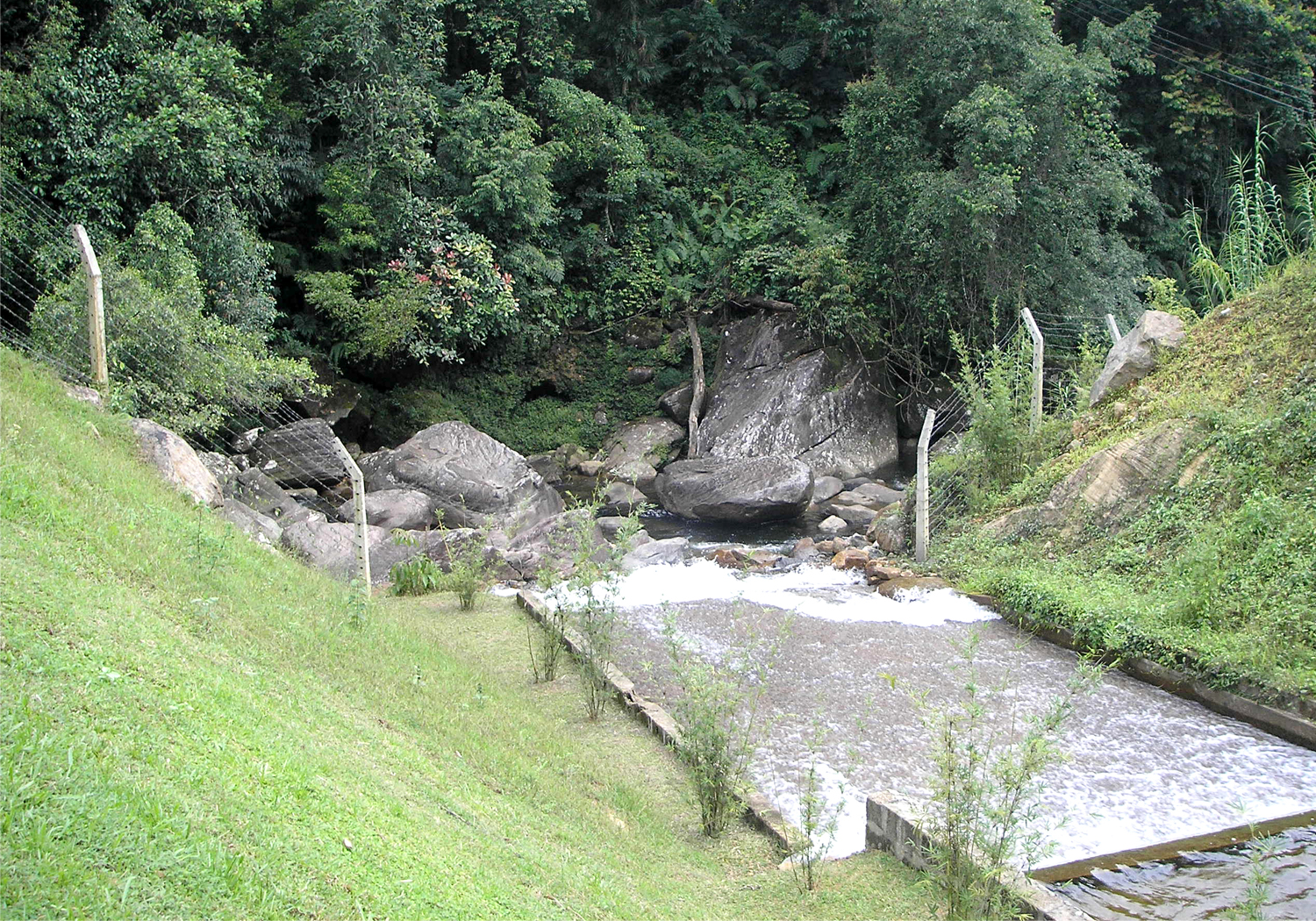
Tailrace

=== Transmission line ===
The method of transmission is an 18 km line connected to the Kosgama – Ratnapura 33 kV power line. Pre-stressed concrete poles, SL-type steel towers and elm conductors are used for the construction of the transmission line. The route of the new line is the same as the route taken by the existing Sri Pada line and Erathna 33 kV supply line.

=== Design ===
Designs were carried out by specialised consultants and those were divided among the company itself and outsourced consultants. Powerhouse structural design was done by Stems Consultants (Pte) Ltd. Hydraulic and Hydropower specialised designs are done by a team of specialists namely, G.G. Jayawardhana, P.S.P.S. De Saram and A. K. Dheerasinghe. Other structural designs were outsourced and done by individual structural designers. The architectural design of the powerhouse was done by Pan Arch (Pvt) Ltd.

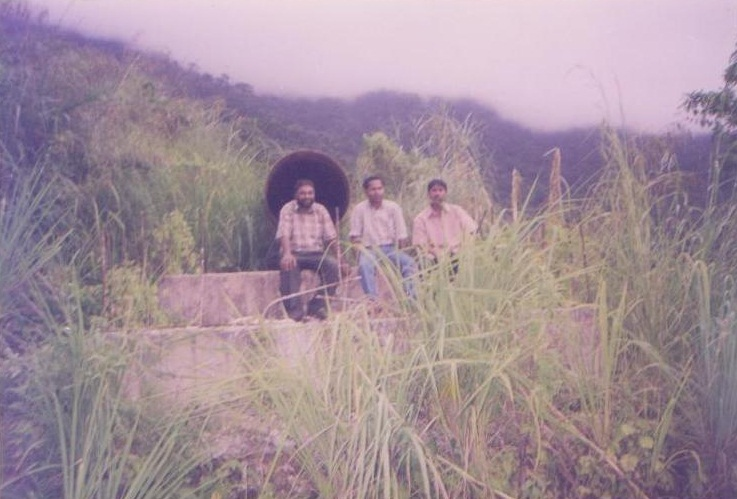
Project Management Team of Vallibel (Mr Suraweera, Aruna Dheerasinghe are in the photo)

The plant was commissioned in July 2004 and since then it serves Sri Lankan national grid by providing 40 GWh of green energy every year.

== Contribution to sustainable development ==
=== Environmental benefits ===
The project contributes to an improvement of the local environment by reducing emissions such as CO_{2}, SO_{x} and NO_{x} from thermal power plants. By this project, an equal amount of power generated using thermal sources which results in increasing the emission of Green House Gases is displaced. Due to the existence of this project, approximately 50,000 Mt of CO_{2} emissions are reduced annually.

=== Economic benefits ===
The project created employment opportunities during the project commissioning and operational period. The commissioning of this project consists of earthwork, concrete work as well as mechanical and electrical work. This required both skilled and unskilled employees. As a result of the project, the income of the rural families in the project area increased. This is in line with the sustainable development criteria of the country such as eradication of poverty and improving social development.

=== Social welfare ===
This project works closely with the community to upgrade their standard of living and make a genuine contribution to their lives. During the construction of the plant, the welfare of the community, minimal disturbance to lifestyles, develop housing and maintenance of the roads are prioritised. The welfare activities are as follows,

- Improvement of the access to the village of Halgastenna through the construction of a road to replace the steep and dangerous footpath previously used by villagers
- Repair of the Erathna – Adavikanda road which runs through the main access road to Sri Pada from Kuruwita
- Provide financial assistance to local authorities for cleaning the Sri Pada Road before the start of the pilgrimage season.
- For the benefit of worshippers, a place of worship at Sri Pada, and a Buddha statue with a platform for worshipping were constructed.
- Five hundred steps were built at Warangal for the development of the devotees' footpath, and footbridges, handrails and guard rails were constructed along the path.
- The Kuruwita – Erathna road was repaired for 5 km from Kuruwita to Sudagala and a side wall was constructed at a culvert near Marukanda.
- A building for a local school, Erathna Maha Vidyalaya was constructed
- The men's ward of the Erathna rural hospital along with the Kuruwita Police Station were rehabilitated
- 5 houses were constructed and donated for villagers.
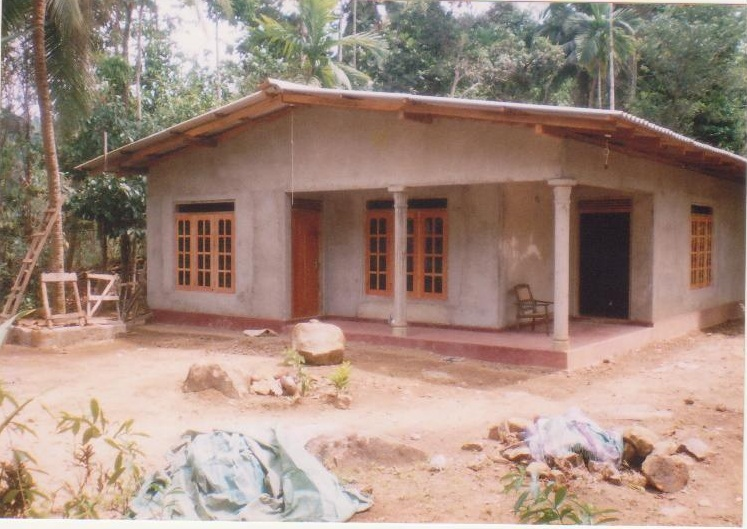
Donated House

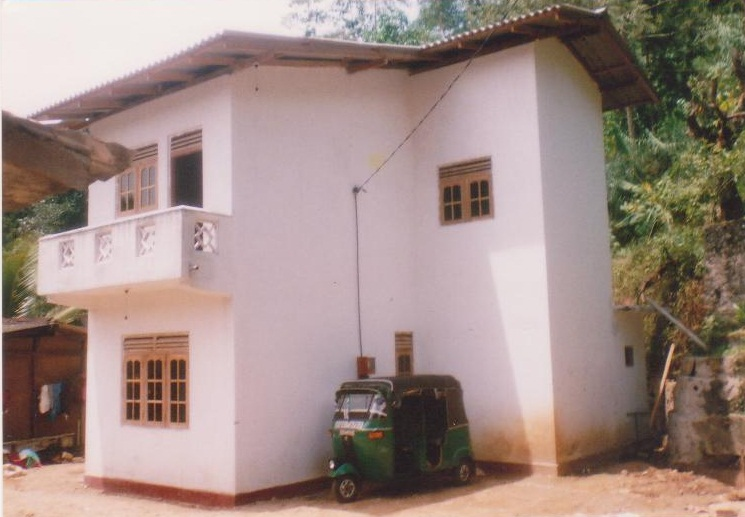
Donated House

== Environmental impacts ==
This project results in a reduction in the water flow between the weir and the powerhouse and mandatory discharges are released throughout the project life to avoid any impact on the river ecosystem. The water quality does not change due to the implementation of the project and there would be no change in the water availability downstream too. The potential environmental impacts identified were soil erosion, loss of soil stability and slope failure, reduction in the river flow between the weir and tailrace, and some ecological impacts such as interference with fish mobility, destruction of plants and noise. But, the potential impacts of this project were negligible comparatively and all the precautions were taken to minimise the impacts as per the recommendations of relevant authorities and consultants.

== Financial background ==
The total investment of the company was 720 MN LKR and the equity to debt ratio is 30:70. Debt facilities were arranged by Commercial Bank, Sampath Bank & DFCC Bank of Sri Lanka.

== Awards and certificates ==
Vallibel Power Erathna PLC operates as per International standards.

The Erathna Mini Hydro Power Project won the Bronze Award in Mini Hydro Category at the National Green Awards 2012.

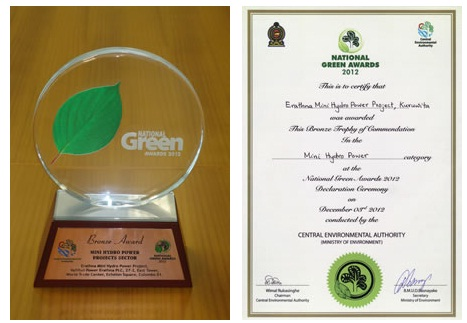
Green Award
