= Supplementarity =

Principle of Kyoto protocol

"Supplementarity", also referred to as "the supplementary principle", is one of the main principles of the Kyoto Protocol. The concept is that internal abatement of emissions should take precedence before external participation in flexible mechanisms. These mechanisms include emissions trading, Clean Development Mechanism (CDM), and Joint Implementation (JI).

Emissions trading basically refers to the trading of emissions allowances (carbon credits) between one regulated entity and a less pollutive entity. This trading of permits results in a marginal economic disincentive to the buyer and a marginal economic incentive the abater.

CDM and JI are flexible mechanisms based on the concept of a carbon project. These projects reduce GHG voluntarily (outside the capped sectors) and therefore can be imported into the capped sector to aid in compliance.

The supplementarity principle is found in three articles of the Kyoto Protocol: article 6 and 17 with regards to trading, and article 12 with regards to the clean development mechanism.

Article 6.1 states that "The acquisition of emission reduction units shall be supplemental to domestic actions for the purposes of meeting commitments under Article 3". Article 17 states that "[…]Any such trading shall be supplemental to domestic actions for the purpose of meeting quantified emission limitation and reduction commitments under that article". Article 12.3.b states that "Parties included in Annex I may use the certified emission reductions accruing from such project activities to contribute to compliance with part of their quantified emission limitation and reduction commitments under Article 3[…]".

The actual meaning of the principle has been heavily argued since the signing of Kyoto Protocol in 1997. The COP/MOP is the body that represents the signers/ratifiers of the protocol and they have not been able to agree on a specific definition of the limit on use of flexible mechanisms. The original text has been interpreted to mean that anywhere from 3-50% of emissions could be offset by trading mechanisms. However, the only determination that has been made is that the actual value of supplementarity should be decided at the country level.

In the United States RGGI (Regional Greenhouse Gas Initiative) has set a precedent in that it will initially allow only up to 3.3% compliance occur by means of offset projects (carbon projects). This value can increase to 5% and ultimately 10% if certain price thresholds are exceeded in the region.

== In the news ==
- "CDM Link". UNFCCC. July 23, 2007. Latest CDM Project News

== See also ==
- Emissions trading
- Kyoto Protocol
- Paris Agreement
- UNFCCC
