= Views on the Kyoto Protocol =

The Kyoto Protocol was an international treaty which extended the 1992 United Nations Framework Convention on Climate Change.

A 2007 study by Gupta et al. assessed the literature on climate change policy, which showed no authoritative assessments of the UNFCCC or its Protocol that assert these agreements have, or will, succeed in fully solving the climate problem. It was assumed that the UNFCCC or its Protocol would not be changed. The Framework Convention and its Protocol include provisions for future policy actions to be taken.

Some environmentalists have supported the Kyoto Protocol because it is "the only game in town," and possibly because they expect that future emission reduction commitments may demand more stringent emission reductions (Aldy et al.., 2003, p. 9). Some environmentalists and scientists have criticized the existing commitments for being too weak (Grubb, 2000, p. 5). On the other hand, multiple economists think that the commitments are stronger than is justified. Particularly in the US, a number of economists have also been critical of the failure to include quantified commitments for developing countries (Grubb, 2000, p. 31).

== Commentaries on negotiations ==
Level and timing of proposed targets
Party	Target level and date (reductions from 1990)	Gas(es) covered	Date proposed
AOSIS	20% by 2005	CO_{2}	20 September 1994
Brazil	30% by 2020 (differentiated)	CO_{2}, CH_{4}, N_{2}O	28 May 1997
Canada	3% by 2010, additional 5% by 2015	All GHGs	2 December 1997
Czech Republic	5% by 2005, 15% by 2010	CO_{2}, CH_{4}, N_{2}O	27 March 1997
Democratic; Republic of the Congo (Zaire)	10% by 2005, 15% by 2010, 20% by 2020	All GHGs	23 October 1996
EU	at least 7.5% by 2005, 15% by 2010	CO_{2}, CH_{4}, N_{2}O	19 June 1997, 4 March 1997
France	7-10% in average per capita emissions by 2010 (differentiated)	All GHGs	6 December 1996
Germany	10% by 2005, 15-20% by 2010	CO_{2}	26 March 1996
G-77 and China	at least 7.5% by 2005, 15% by 2010, an additional 20% by 2020	CO_{2}, CH_{4}, N_{2}O (gas-by-gas)	22 October 1997
Hungary et al.	Stabilization by 2005 plus pledging of differentiated targets	CO_{2}, CH_{4}, N_{2}O	27 March 1997
Japan	5% by 2008-2012 (differentiated)	CO_{2}, CH_{4}, N_{2}O	6 October 1997
New Zealand	5% in a 5-year period, starting no earlier than 2005	CO_{2}, CH_{4}, N_{2}O	2 December 1997
Peru	15% (CO_{2}) by 2005, 15-20% (all GHGs) by 2010	see previous column	7 March 1997
Philippines	20% by 2005, 20% by 2010	All GHGs	25 March 1997
Russian Federation	Stabilization by 2010 plus additional differentiated targets for "Annex B" Parties	All GHGs	26 February 1997
Switzerland	10% by 2010 (differentiated)	All GHGs	29 November 1996
UK	5-10% by 2010	All GHGs	16 April 1996

The choice of 1990 as the main base year remains in Kyoto, as it does in the original Framework Convention (UNFCCC). The importance of the choice of base year was discussed by Liverman (2008). According to Liverman (2008), the idea of using historical emissions as a basis for the Kyoto targets was rejected on the basis that good data was not available prior to 1990. Liverman (2008), however, commented that a 1990 base year favours several powerful interests including the UK, Germany and Russia. This is because these countries had high CO_{2} emissions in 1990.

In the UK following 1990, emissions had declined because of a switch from coal to gas ("Dash for Gas"), which has lower emissions than coal. This was due to the UK's privatization of coal mining and its switch to natural gas supported by North Sea reserves. Germany benefited from the 1990 base year because of its reunification between West and East Germany. East Germany's emissions fell dramatically following the collapse of East German industry after the fall of the Berlin Wall. Germany could therefore take credit for the resultant decline in emissions.

According to Liverman (2008), some of the former Soviet satellites wanted a base year to reflect their highest emissions prior to their industrial collapse. A high emissions baseline was an advantage for countries whose emissions had subsequently fallen due to economic collapse. On the other hand, some of the former Soviet countries regard their emissions surplus as compensation for the trauma of economic restructuring.

Japan promoted the idea of flexible baselines, and favoured a base year of 1995 for HFCs. Their HFC emissions had grown in the early 1990s as a substitute for CFCs banned in the Montreal Protocol.

Liverman (2008) argued that countries, such as the US, made suggestions during negotiations in order to lower their responsibility to cut emissions. These suggestions included the inclusion of carbon sinks (the carbon absorbed annually by forests and other land cover) and having net current emissions as the basis for responsibility, rather than historical emissions.

Another perspective on negotiations was provided by Grubb (2003). The final days of negotiation of the Protocol saw a clash between the EU and the US and Japan. The EU aimed for flat-rate reductions in the range of 10–15% below 1990 levels, while the US and Japan supported reductions of 0–5%. Countries that had supported differentiation of targets between countries had different ideas on how it should be calculated, and different indicators were proposed, e.g., targets that were related to GDP, energy intensity (energy use per unit of economic output), and so on. According to Grubb (2003), the only common theme of these indicators was that each proposal suited the interests of the country making the proposal.

Aldy et al. (2003) commented on the Kyoto targets and how they related to economic growth. Considering the growth of some economies and the collapse of others since 1990, the range of implicit targets is much greater than that suggested by the Kyoto targets. According to Aldy et al. (2003), the US faced a cut of about 30% below "business-as-usual" (BAU) emissions (i.e., projected emissions in the absence of measures to limit emissions), which is more stringent than that implied by its Kyoto target (a 7% reduction in emissions compared to 1990 levels). This contrasts with Russia and other Kyoto "economies in transition" (EITs), who, according to Aldy et al. (2003), faced Kyoto targets that allowed substantial increases in their emissions above BAU.

Grubb (2003), however, commented that the US, having per-capita emissions twice that of most other OECD countries, was vulnerable to the suggestion that it had huge potential for making reductions. From this viewpoint, the US was obliged to cut emissions back more than other countries. Grubb (2003) also commented that for two or three years after the Kyoto agreement, the usual economic perspective was that emissions from the EITs would rise sharply as their economies recovered. In reality, however, emissions of the EITs failed to grow as multiple models had predicted.

In August 2012, in a speech given at his alma mater, Todd Stern — the US Climate Change envoy — expressed the challenges of the UNFCCC process as follows, "Climate change is not a conventional environmental issue...It implicates virtually every aspect of a state's economy, so it makes countries nervous about growth and development. This is an economic issue every bit as it is an environmental one." He went on to explain that the United Nations Framework Convention on Climate Change is a multilateral body concerned with climate change and can be an inefficient system for enacting international policy. Because the framework system includes over 190 countries and because negotiations are governed by consensus, small groups of countries can often block progress.

== General comments ==
Baylis et al. (2011) argued that a successful international climate policy would require additional emission reductions from developing countries such as China and India.

As the first legally binding climate treaty, the Kyoto Protocol (signed 11 December 1997, effective 16 February 2005) was the most prominent international agreement on climate change prior to the Paris Agreement of 2015. Highly controversial, it was criticized both for going too far and not nearly far enough in restricting emissions of greenhouse gases. A major flaw of the agreement, in terms of its potential to meet its goals, was that the two leading emitters of greenhouse gases in the world, China and the United States, were not bound by the protocol.

The United States and Australia were the only major developed nations to sign but not ratify the Kyoto protocol (see signatories). The agreement was brokered by then-Vice President Al Gore and signed by then-President Bill Clinton on 12 November 1998 but it was never ratified by the US Senate. Soon after taking office, in March 2001, then-President George W. Bush withdrew the US as a signatory. Australia refused to ratify the agreement until 2007. Canada, under the Harper government, withdrew from the protocol on 15 December 2012.

The Kyoto protocol established a two-tier system, of Annex I (developed) and Annex II (developing) countries, who were differentially affected as signatories. Both China and India, the world's two most populous countries, were ranked as "developing countries". As a result, although both ratified the protocol, they were not required to reduce or even limit the growth of carbon emissions under the agreement. As listed by greenhouse gas emissions per capita, they had rankings of 121st largest per capita emitter at 3.9 Tonnes of CO_{2}e and 162nd largest per capita emitter at 1.8 Tonnes of CO_{2}e respectively, compared with for example the U.S. at position of the 14th largest per capita CO_{2}e emitter at 22.9 Tonnes of CO_{2}e. Nevertheless, China was the world's second largest producer of greenhouse gas emissions, and India the 4th (see: countries by greenhouse emissions).

Additionally, as predicted by Fred Singer, high costs of decreasing emissions caused significant production to move to countries that were not covered under the treaty, such as India and China. The outsourcing of carbon-intensive parts of the production chain from traditionally wealthier countries to countries like China and India who were considered developing countries, has displaced emissions rather than reducing overall emissions.

In May 2010 the Hartwell Paper was published by academics and policy makers from the London School of Economics and the University of Oxford. The paper argued that the Kyoto Protocol crashed in late 2009 and "has failed to produce any discernable real world reductions in emissions of greenhouse gases in fifteen years." They criticized the Kyoto Protocols for focusing too much on carbon emissions. Their paper advocated a controversial and piecemeal approach to decarbonization of the global economy that would broaden the range of approaches taken. The Hartwell paper proposed that "the organising principle of our effort should be the raising up of human dignity via three overarching objectives: ensuring energy access for all; ensuring that we develop in a manner that does not undermine the essential functioning of the Earth system; ensuring that our societies are adequately equipped to withstand the risks and dangers that come from all the vagaries of climate, whatever their cause may be". They preferred not to suggest specific structural steps for achieving such changes.

A 2021 review considers both the institutional design and the political strategies that have affected the adoption of the Kyoto protocol. It concludes that the Kyoto protocol's relatively small impact on global carbon dioxide emissions reflects a number of factors, including "deliberate political strategy, unequal power, and the absence of leadership" among and within nations. The efforts of fossil fuel interests and conservative think tanks to spread disinformation and climate change denial have influenced public opinion and political action both within the United States and beyond it. The direct lobbying of fossil fuel companies and their funding of political actors have slowed political action to address climate change at regional, national, and international levels.

== Support ==
In September 2012 the Netherlands Environmental Assessment Agency and the European Commission's Joint Research Centre released a detailed study which showed that the 37 main Kyoto nations plus the U.S. (which did not ratify the treaty) have emitted 7.5 per cent less carbon dioxide into the atmosphere in 2010 than in 1990.

The Bush Administration's rejection of Kyoto could have led to its failure (Grubb, 2002, p. 140). In the view of Grubb (2002), the EU's subsequent decision to support the Protocol was key. Environmental organization the Environmental Defense Fund have been supportive of the Protocol (EDF, 2005). Jonathan Pershing, director of the Climate and Energy Program at the World Resources Institute, stated that the Protocol "makes it clear that the world takes the global warming problem seriously" (Pershing, 2005).

The United Nations has issued reports favoring the Kyoto Protocol. Supporters of Kyoto stated it is a first step towards meeting the ultimate objective of the UNFCCC, which is to prevent dangerous climate change. They state that the Protocol will be revised in order to meet this objective, as is required by UNFCCC Article 4.2(d).

In 2001, sixteen national science academies stated that ratification of the Protocol represented a "small but essential first step towards stabilising atmospheric concentrations of greenhouse gases." In 2005, the national science academies of the G8 nations and Brazil, China and India made a statement where they "urged" all nations to "take prompt action to reduce the causes of climate change, adapt to its impacts and ensure that the issue is included in all relevant national and international strategies." They stated that these actions should be taken in line with UNFCCC principles.

An international day of action was planned for 3 December 2005, to coincide with the Meeting of the Parties in Montreal. The planned demonstrations were endorsed by the Assembly of Movements of the World Social Forum.

A group of major Canadian corporations also called for urgent action regarding climate change, and have suggested that Kyoto is only a first step.

== Criticism ==
Some argue the protocol does not go far enough to curb greenhouse emissions (Niue, The Cook Islands, and Nauru added notes to this effect when signing the protocol). Some environmental economists have been critical of the Kyoto Protocol. Many see the costs of the Kyoto Protocol as outweighing the benefits, some believing the standards which Kyoto sets to be too optimistic, others seeing a highly inequitable and inefficient agreement which would do little to curb greenhouse gas emissions.

Stavins (2005) criticized the Protocol as doing "too little, too fast," in that it asks for excessively costly short-term reductions in emissions, without determining what should be done over longer timeframes (Stern 2007, p. 478). Over longer timeframes, there is more flexibility to make reductions in line with normal cycles of capital stock replacement. At the time of the Protocol's first commitment period, in 1997, it provided a 15-year window for action. The Protocol does not provide any guidance or formulae linking the action required in the first commitment period to an overall global quantity constraint on emissions, or to a long-term timetable for emissions reductions. In the view of Stern (2007), this lack of a long-term goal, coupled with problems over incentives to comply with emission reduction commitments, prevented the Protocol from providing a credible signal for governments and businesses to make long-term investments.

Some have heavily criticized the Protocol for only setting emission reductions for rich countries, while not setting such commitments for the fast-growing emerging economies, e.g., China and India (Stern 2007, p. 478). Australia (under Prime Minister John Howard) and the US subsequently did not ratify the Protocol, although Australia has since ratified the treaty. A number of other countries have not taken strong steps to implement it. Developing countries did take on obligations under the Protocol, but these were unquantified and allowed climate change to be addressed as part of wider national policies on sustainable development.

In his 2009 book ("Storms of my Grandchildren") and in an open letter to US President Obama, climate scientist James Hansen criticized the Kyoto Protocol for being ineffective.

In May 2010 the Hartwell Paper was published by the London School of Economics in collaboration with the University of Oxford. This paper was written by 14 academics from various disciplines in the sciences and humanities, and also some policies thinkers, and they argued that after the failure of the 2009 Copenhagen Climate Summit, the Kyoto Protocol crashed and they claimed that it "has failed to produce any discernable real world reductions in emissions of greenhouse gases in fifteen years." They argued that this failure opened an opportunity to set climate policy free from Kyoto and the paper advocates a controversial and piecemeal approach to decarbonization of the global economy. The Hartwell paper proposes that "the organising principle of our effort should be the raising up of human dignity via three overarching objectives: ensuring energy access for all; ensuring that we develop in a manner that does not undermine the essential functioning of the Earth system; ensuring that our societies are adequately equipped to withstand the risks and dangers that come from all the vagaries of climate, whatever their cause may be."

The overall umbrella and processes of the UNFCCC and the Kyoto Protocol have been criticized for not having achieved the stated goals of reducing the emission of carbon dioxide (the primary culprit blamed for rising global temperatures of the 21st century).

== Economics ==
The flexibility mechanisms that are defined in the Protocol could allow the Annex B countries to meet their emission reduction commitments at a significantly reduced cost (Bashmakov et al.., 2001, p. 402; Goulder and Pizer, 2006, p. 12). Actual costs will be determined by how individual countries decide to meet their commitments. This can involve the use of the international flexibility mechanisms, but domestic policies can also contribute, such as raising taxes on gasoline or regulatory fines for major polluters.

The Kyoto Protocol was designed to be efficient and equitable (Toth et al.., 2001, p. 660), but it has been subject to criticism (Stern, 2007, p. 478). Nordhaus (2001) drew attention to the inefficiencies of the Kyoto Protocol's flexibility mechanisms. Nordhaus explained that meeting the emission reduction commitments specified in the Kyoto-Bonn Accord, using the quantity-type instruments as defined in the Protocol, would be less efficient compared to a situation where price-type instruments were used, e.g., a harmonized carbon tax (comparisons of quantity-type and price-type instruments are included in the carbon tax and emissions trading articles). Nordhaus suggested that given the Protocol's large costs and small benefits, it might be better for it to be redesigned along the lines of a global carbon tax. Other economists such as Gwyn Prins and Steve Rayner, think an entirely different approach needs to be followed than suggested by the Kyoto Protocol.

The issue of the efficient (or "optimal") path for greenhouse gas (GHG) emissions depends on various assumptions (Klein et al.., 2007). Some of these assumptions, e.g., aggregating impacts across regions and over time, rely on value judgements (Azar, 1998; Fisher et al.., 2007). In Nordhaus's analysis, the implied emissions path of the Kyoto-Bonn Accord is more aggressive than that suggested in his analysis (Klein et al.., 2007). In other words, the efficient abatement path for emissions in Nordhaus's analysis, suggests more gradual near-term emissions abatement than that implied by Kyoto's emission reduction commitments. This is a common finding of economic cost-benefit analysis, and is driven by low estimates of marginal (or incremental) climate change damages (the social cost of carbon).

== U.S. History with the Protocol ==
Clinton Administration Vice President Al Gore was a main participant in putting the Kyoto Protocol together in 1997. President Bill Clinton signed the agreement in November 1998, but the US Senate refused to ratify it, citing potential damage to the US economy required by compliance. The Senate also balked at the agreement because it excluded certain developing countries, including India and China, from having to comply with new emissions standards.

Bush administration Similar objections to the Kyoto Protocol were why the Bush administration refused to sign. They argued the division between Annex 1 and developing countries was unfair, and that both countries needed to reduce their emissions unilaterally. President George W. Bush claimed that the cost of following the Protocols requirements will stress the economy.

Al Gore accused Bush of showing the world "a stunning display of moral cowardice." "Kyoto's ability to survive the near-fatal attacks of the Bush administration is testimony to the urgency of the climate problem." Worldwatch Institute Laurie David, Natural Resources Defense Council said, "As the world celebrates the global warming pact's debut, Bush continues to pander to the energy industry."

Obama Administration President Obama was elected under widespread belief that shortly after arriving in office he would take swift and decisive action to join the world in reducing GHG emissions and therefore helping battle global climate change. According to The American, "Obama was widely expected to quickly pass a Kyoto-style domestic cap-and-trade program for greenhouse gases, positioning America to take the moral high ground in Copenhagen, thus luring (or compelling) China and India to accept emissions targets.". Signing the Kyoto protocol seemed like the logical first step so it came as a surprise when he rejected the Kyoto protocol for reasons similar to those of former president Bush. According to The American, "the treaty's fundamental flaws were well understood: It set very ambitious—and costly—targets for the United States while allowing emissions from the developing world to continue to rise unchecked. (And indeed today, despite Kyoto's ratification, China has become the world's leading emitter of greenhouse gases.) Americans don't mind contributing to a solution, but Kyoto asked a lot of sacrifice for little reward.". President Obama was also expected to represent the U.S in Copenhagen and negotiate terms for the extension of the Kyoto Protocol past 2012. Yet instead of the U.S. contributing to the development and signing of a Kyoto-like treaty, the U.S. is suggesting extreme modifications of the Kyoto emission management system and precipitating intense debates and clashes over the treaty which will follow Kyoto. A number of countries fear these new treaty additions will paralyze negotiations and stop multiple countries currently under the Kyoto Protocol from re-signing as well as stop new countries, like China and India, from signing. "the Obama administration's proposals could undermine a new global treaty and weaken the world's ability to stave off the worst effects of climate change."

Some people feel that the combination of the U.S not signing the Kyoto Protocol (ensuring it will run out in 2012) and the U.S. attempt to change almost the entire architecture of the Kyoto Protocol in Copenhagen means the end of the Kyoto Protocol as we know it and perhaps a new global climate treaty. "If Kyoto is scrapped, it could take several years to negotiate a replacement framework, a delay that could strike a terminal blow at efforts to prevent dangerous climate change. In Europe we want to build on Kyoto, but the US proposal would in effect kill it off. If we have to start from scratch then it all takes time. It could be 2015 or 2016 before something is in place, who knows."

== Objections to the Kyoto Protocol and U.S refusal to sign ==
The Kyoto Protocol was a huge leap forward towards an intergovernmental united strategy to reduce GHG's emissions globally. But it wasn't without its objections. Some of the main criticisms were against categorizing different countries into annexes, with each annex having its own responsibility for emission reductions based on historic GHG emissions and, therefore, historic contribution to global climate change. "Some of the criticism of the Protocol has been based on the idea of climate justice." This has particularly centered on the balance between the low emissions and high vulnerability of the developing world to climate change, compared to high emissions in the developed world." Other objections were the use of carbon off-sets as a method for a country to reduce its carbon emissions. Although it can be beneficial to balance out one GHG emission by implementing an equal carbon offset, it still doesn't completely eliminate the original carbon emission and therefore ultimately reduce the amount of GHG's in the atmosphere.

== See also ==
- Flexible Mechanisms § Views on the flexibility mechanisms
