= Milk manufacturing marketing adjustment =

Aspect of United States agricultural policy

In United States agricultural policy, the make allowance (or milk manufacturing marketing adjustment) is the margin between the government support price for milk and the Commodity Credit Corporation (CCC) purchase price for butter, nonfat dry milk, and cheese. This margin is administratively set to cover the costs of “making” milk into butter, nonfat dry milk, or cheese to reach the desired level of prices for milk in manufacturing uses.
