= Annex B =

Annex B may refer to:

- An annex of the Kyoto Protocol for fighting global warming; see List of Kyoto Protocol signatories
- Integrated Services Digital Network, a digital telephony standard
- The byte stream format specified in Advanced Video Coding (H.264)
- The byte stream format specified in High Efficiency Video Coding (H.265)
