= Kyoto Protocol =

1997 international treaty to reduce greenhouse gas emissions

Kyoto Protocol to the UNFCCC
- Annex B parties with binding targets in the second period Annex B parties with binding targets in the first period but not the second Non-Annex B parties without binding targets Annex B parties with binding targets in the first period but which withdrew from the Protocol Signatories to the Protocol that have not ratified Other UN member states and observers that are not party to the Protocol
- Signed: 11 December 1997
- Location: Kyoto, Japan
- Effective: 16 February 2005
- Condition: Ratification by at least 55 states to the Convention
- Expired: 31 December 2012 (first commitment period); 31 December 2020 (second commitment period)
- Signatories: 84 (1998–1999 signing period)
- Parties: 192 (the European Union, Cook Islands, Niue, and all UN member states except Andorra, Canada, South Sudan, and the United States as of 2022)
- Depositary: Secretary-General of the United Nations
- Languages: Arabic, Mandarin, English, French, Russian, and Spanish

Full text
- Kyoto Protocol at Wikisource

Kyoto Protocol Extension (2012–2020)
Doha Amendment to the Kyoto Protocol
- Acceptance of the Doha Amendment States that ratified Kyoto protocol parties that did not ratify Non-parties to the Kyoto Protocol
- Type: Amendment to international agreement
- Drafted: 8 December 2012
- Location: Doha, Qatar
- Effective: 31 December 2020
- Condition: Ratification by 144 state parties required
- Expiration: 31 December 2020
- Ratifiers: 147

Full text
- Doha Amendment to the Kyoto Protocol at Wikisource

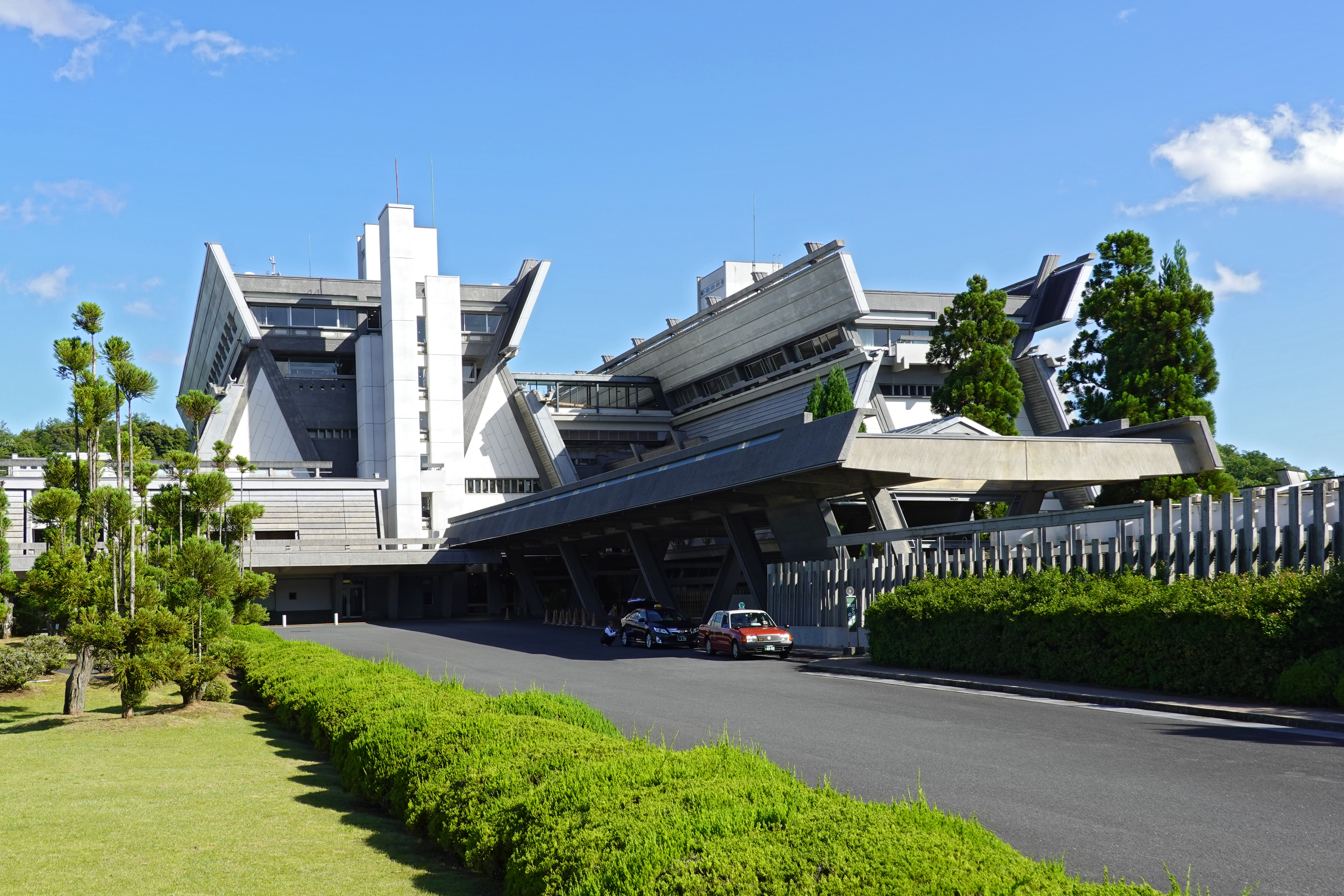
Kyoto International Conference Center

The Kyoto Protocol (Japanese: 京都議定書, Hepburn: Kyōto Giteisho) was an international treaty which extended the 1992 United Nations Framework Convention on Climate Change (UNFCCC) that commits state parties to reduce greenhouse gas emissions, based on the scientific consensus that global warming is occurring and that human-made CO_{2} emissions are driving it. The Kyoto Protocol was adopted in Kyoto, Japan, on 11 December 1997 and entered into force on 16 February 2005. There were 192 parties (Canada withdrew from the protocol, effective December 2012) to the Protocol in 2020.

The Kyoto Protocol implemented the objective of the UNFCCC to reduce the onset of global warming by reducing greenhouse gas concentrations in the atmosphere to "a level that would prevent dangerous anthropogenic interference with the climate system" (Article 2). The Kyoto Protocol applied to the seven greenhouse gases listed in Annex A: carbon dioxide (CO_{2}), methane (CH_{4}), nitrous oxide (N_{2}O), hydrofluorocarbons (HFCs), perfluorocarbons (PFCs), sulfur hexafluoride (SF_{6}), nitrogen trifluoride (NF_{3}). Nitrogen trifluoride was added for the second compliance period during the Doha Round.

The Protocol was based on the principle of common but differentiated responsibilities: it acknowledged that individual countries have different capabilities in combating climate change, owing to economic development, and therefore placed the obligation to reduce current emissions on developed countries on the basis that they are historically responsible for the current levels of greenhouse gases in the atmosphere.

The Protocol's first commitment period started in 2008 and ended in 2012. All 36 countries that fully participated in the first commitment period complied with the Protocol. However, nine countries had to resort to the flexibility mechanisms by funding emission reductions in other countries because their national emissions were slightly greater than their targets. The 2008 financial crisis reduced emissions. The greatest emission reductions were seen in the former Eastern Bloc countries because the dissolution of the Soviet Union reduced their emissions in the early 1990s. Even though the 36 developed countries reduced their emissions, the global emissions increased by 32% from 1990 to 2010.

A second commitment period was agreed to in 2012 to extend the agreement to 2020, known as the Doha Amendment to the Kyoto Protocol, in which 37 countries had binding targets: Australia, the European Union (and its then 28 member states, now 27), Belarus, Iceland, Kazakhstan, Liechtenstein, Norway, Switzerland, and Ukraine. Belarus, Kazakhstan, and Ukraine stated that they may withdraw from the Kyoto Protocol or not put into legal force the Amendment with second round targets. Japan, New Zealand, and Russia had participated in Kyoto's first-round but did not take on new targets in the second commitment period. Other developed countries without second-round targets were Canada (which withdrew from the Kyoto Protocol in 2012) and the United States (which did not ratify). Canadian Environment Minister Peter Kent announced the decision to withdraw in December of 2011, stating that Canada would have been forced to pay $14 billion if they had remained in the protocol. As of October 2020, 147 states had accepted the Doha Amendment. It entered into force on 31 December 2020, following its acceptance by the mandated minimum of at least 144 states, although the second commitment period ended on the same day. Of the 37 parties with binding commitments, 34 had ratified.

Negotiations were held in the framework of the yearly UNFCCC Climate Change Conferences on measures to be taken after the second commitment period ended in 2020. This resulted in the 2015 adoption of the Paris Agreement, which is a separate instrument under the UNFCCC rather than an amendment of the Kyoto Protocol.

== Chronology ==
1992 – The UN Conference on the Environment and Development is held in Rio de Janeiro. It results in the Framework Convention on Climate Change (UNFCCC) among other agreements.

1995 – Parties to the UNFCCC meet in Berlin (the 1st Conference of Parties (COP) to the UNFCCC) to outline specific targets on emissions.

1997 – In December the parties conclude the Kyoto Protocol in Kyoto, Japan, in which they agree to the broad outlines of emissions targets.

2004 – Russia and Canada ratify the Kyoto Protocol to the UNFCCC bringing the treaty into effect on 16 February 2005.

2011 – Canada became the first signatory to announce its withdrawal from the Kyoto Protocol.

2012 – On 31 December 2012, the first commitment period under the Protocol expired.

The official meeting of all states party to the Kyoto Protocol is the annual Conference of the Parties (COP) to the United Nations Framework Convention on Climate Change (UNFCCC). The first conference was held in 1995 in Berlin (COP 1). The first Meeting of Parties of the Kyoto Protocol (CMP) was held in 2005 in conjunction with COP 11.

== Objectives ==
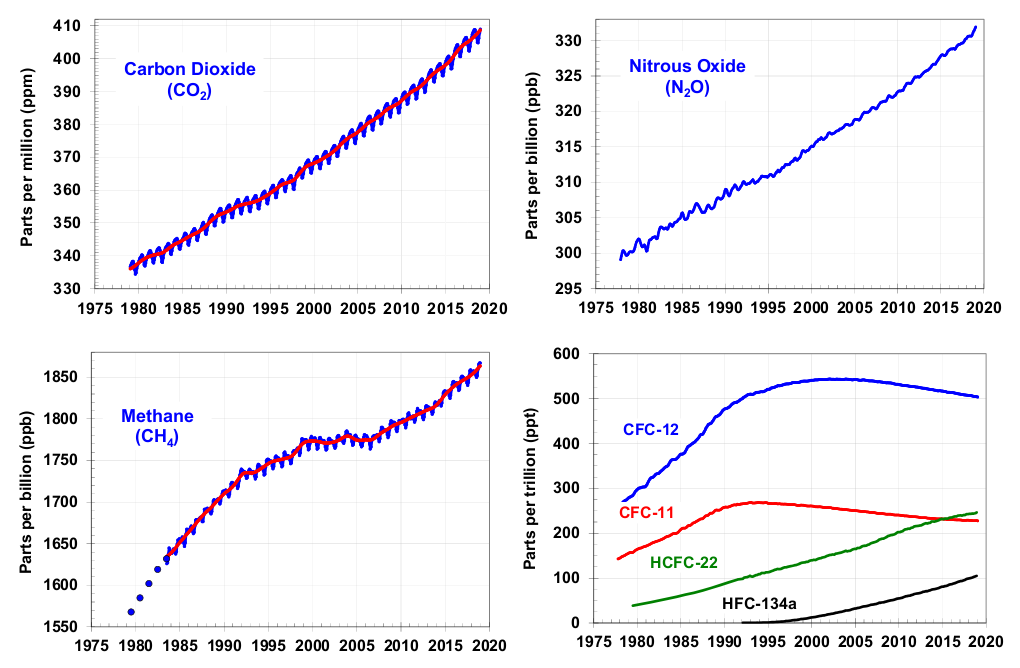
Kyoto is intended to cut global emissions of greenhouse gases.

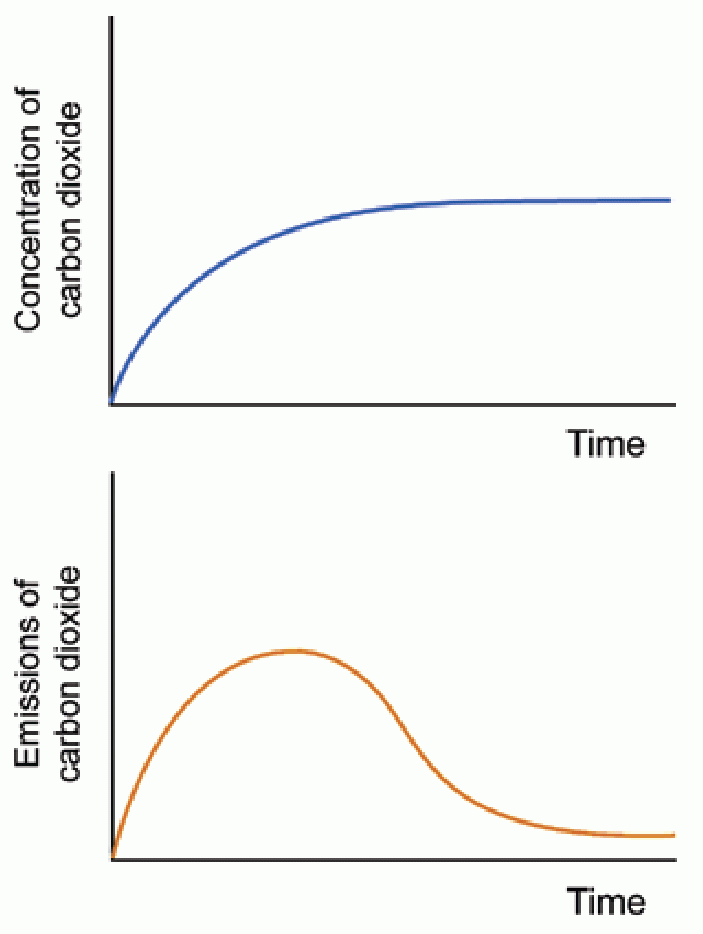
In order to stabilize the atmospheric concentration of CO_{2}, emissions worldwide would need to be dramatically reduced from their present level.

The main goal of the Kyoto Protocol was to control emissions of the main anthropogenic (human-emitted) greenhouse gases (GHGs) in ways that reflect underlying national differences in GHG emissions, wealth, and capacity to make the reductions. The treaty follows the main principles agreed in the original 1992 UN Framework Convention. According to the treaty, in 2012, Annex I Parties who have ratified the treaty must have fulfilled their obligations of greenhouse gas emissions limitations established for the Kyoto Protocol's first commitment period (2008–2012). These emissions limitation commitments are listed in Annex B of the Protocol.

The Kyoto Protocol's first round commitments are the first detailed step taken within the UN Framework Convention on Climate Change. The Protocol establishes a structure of rolling emission reduction commitment periods. It set a timetable starting in 2006 for negotiations to establish emission reduction commitments for a second commitment period. The first period emission reduction commitments expired on 31 December 2012.

The first-round Kyoto emissions limitation commitments were not sufficient to stabilize the atmospheric concentration of GHGs. Stabilization of atmospheric GHG concentrations will require further emissions reductions after the end of the first-round Kyoto commitment period in 2012.

The ultimate objective of the UNFCCC is the "stabilization of greenhouse gas concentrations in the atmosphere at a level that would stop dangerous anthropogenic interference with the climate system." Even if Annex I Parties succeed in meeting their first-round commitments, much greater emission reductions will be required in future to stabilize atmospheric GHG concentrations.

For each of the different anthropogenic GHGs, different levels of emissions reductions would be required to meet the objective of stabilizing atmospheric concentrations. Carbon dioxide (CO_{2}) is the most important anthropogenic GHG. Stabilizing the concentration of CO_{2} in the atmosphere would ultimately require the effective elimination of anthropogenic CO_{2} emissions.

To achieve stabilization, global GHG emissions must peak, then decline. The lower the desired stabilization level, the sooner this peak and decline must occur. For a given stabilization level, larger emissions reductions in the near term allow for less stringent emissions reductions later. On the other hand, less stringent near term emissions reductions would, for a given stabilization level, require more stringent emissions reductions later on.

The first period Kyoto emissions limitations can be viewed as a first-step towards achieving atmospheric stabilization of GHGs. In this sense, the first period Kyoto commitments may affect what future atmospheric stabilization level can be achieved.

== Principal concepts ==
Some of the principal concepts of the Kyoto Protocol are:

- Binding commitments for the Annex I Parties. The main feature of the Protocol is that it established legally binding commitments to reduce emissions of greenhouse gases for Annex I Parties. The commitments were based on the Berlin Mandate, which was a part of UNFCCC negotiations leading up to the Protocol.
- Implementation. In order to meet the objectives of the Protocol, Annex I Parties are required to prepare policies and measures for the reduction of greenhouse gases in their respective countries. In addition, they are required to increase the absorption of these gases and utilize all mechanisms available, such as joint implementation, the clean development mechanism and emissions trading, in order to be rewarded with credits that would allow more greenhouse gas emissions at home.
- Minimizing Impacts on Developing Countries by establishing an adaptation fund for climate change.
- Accounting, Reporting and Review in order to ensure the integrity of the Protocol.
- Compliance. Establishing a Compliance Committee to enforce compliance with the commitments under the Protocol.

=== Flexibility mechanisms ===
The Protocol defines three "Flexibility Mechanisms" that can be used by Annex I Parties in meeting their emission limitation commitments. The flexibility mechanisms are International Emissions Trading (IET), the Clean Development Mechanism (CDM), and Joint Implementation (JI). IET allows Annex I Parties to "trade" their emissions (Assigned Amount Units, AAUs, or "allowances" for short).

The economic basis for providing this flexibility is that the marginal cost of reducing (or abating) emissions differs among countries. "Marginal cost" is the cost of abating the last tonne of CO_{2}-eq for an Annex I/non-Annex I Party. At the time of the original Kyoto targets, studies suggested that the flexibility mechanisms could reduce the overall (aggregate) cost of meeting the targets. Studies also showed that national losses in Annex I gross domestic product (GDP) could be reduced by the use of the flexibility mechanisms.

The CDM and JI are called "project-based mechanisms", in that they generate emission reductions from projects. The difference between IET and the project-based mechanisms is that IET is based on the setting of a quantitative restriction of emissions, while the CDM and JI are based on the idea of "production" of emission reductions. The CDM is designed to encourage production of emission reductions in non-Annex I Parties, while JI encourages production of emission reductions in Annex I Parties.

The production of emission reductions generated by the CDM and JI can be used by Annex I Parties in meeting their emission limitation commitments. The emission reductions produced by the CDM and JI are both measured against a hypothetical baseline of emissions that would have occurred in the absence of a particular emission reduction project. The emission reductions produced by the CDM are called Certified emission reductions (CERs); reductions produced by JI are called emission reduction units (ERUs). The reductions are called "credits" because they are emission reductions credited against a hypothetical baseline of emissions.

Only emission reduction projects that do not involve using nuclear energy are eligible for accreditation under the CDM, in order to prevent nuclear technology exports from becoming the default route for obtaining credits under the CDM.

Each Annex I country is required to submit an annual report of inventories of all anthropogenic greenhouse gas emissions from sources and removals from sinks under UNFCCC and the Kyoto Protocol. These countries nominate a person (called a "designated national authority") to create and manage its greenhouse gas inventory. Virtually all of the non-Annex I countries have also established a designated national authority to manage their Kyoto obligations, specifically the "CDM process". This determines which GHG projects they wish to propose for accreditation by the CDM Executive Board.

==== International emissions trading ====
Allowance prices for carbon emission trade in all major emission trading schemes in Euro per ton of CO_{2} emitted (from 2008 until August 2024).

Carbon emission trading (also called carbon market, emission trading scheme (ETS) or cap and trade) is a type of emissions trading scheme designed for carbon dioxide (CO_{2}) and other greenhouse gases (GHGs). A form of carbon pricing, its purpose is to limit climate change by creating a market with limited allowances for emissions. Carbon emissions trading is a common method that countries use to attempt to meet their pledges under the Paris Agreement, with schemes operational in China, the European Union, and other countries.

Emissions trading sets a quantitative total limit on the emissions produced by all participating emitters, which correspondingly determines the prices of emissions. Under emission trading, a polluter having more emissions than their quota has to purchase the right to emit more from emitters with fewer emissions. This can reduce the competitiveness of fossil fuels, which are the main driver of climate change. Instead, carbon emissions trading may accelerate investments into renewable energy, such as wind power and solar power.

However, such schemes are usually not harmonized with defined carbon budgets that are required to maintain global warming below the critical thresholds of 1.5 °C or "well below" 2 °C, with oversupply leading to low prices of allowances with almost no effect on fossil fuel combustion. Emission trade allowances currently cover a wide price range from €7 per tonne of CO_{2} in China's national carbon trading scheme to €63 per tonne of CO_{2} in the EU-ETS (as of September 2021).

Other greenhouse gases can also be traded but are quoted as standard multiples of carbon dioxide with respect to their global warming potential.

An international coalition to create a global carbon market, including a global, gradually declining, cap on emissions began to form in COP30. It can speed up emissions reduction seven-fold in all participating countries, while delivering $200 billion per year for clean-energy and social programs.

===== Intergovernmental emissions trading =====
The design of the European Union Emissions Trading Scheme (EU ETS) implicitly allows for trade of national Kyoto obligations to occur between participating countries. The Carbon Trust found that other than the trading that occurs as part of the EU ETS, no intergovernmental emissions trading had taken place.

One of the environmental problems with IET is the large surplus of allowances that are available. Russia, Ukraine, and the new EU-12 member states (the Kyoto Parties Annex I Economies-in-Transition, abbreviated "EIT": Belarus, Bulgaria, Croatia, Czech Republic, Estonia, Hungary, Latvia, Lithuania, Poland, Romania, Russia, Slovakia, Slovenia, and Ukraine) have a surplus of allowances, while many OECD countries have a deficit. Some of the EITs with a surplus regard it as potential compensation for the trauma of their economic restructuring. When the Kyoto treaty was negotiated, it was recognized that emissions targets for the EITs might lead to them having an excess number of allowances. This excess of allowances were viewed by the EITs as "headroom" to grow their economies. The surplus has, however, also been referred to by some as "hot air", a term which Russia (a country with an estimated surplus of 3.1 billion tonnes of carbon dioxide equivalent allowances) views as "quite offensive".

OECD countries with a deficit could meet their Kyoto commitments by buying allowances from transition countries with a surplus. Unless other commitments were made to reduce the total surplus in allowances, such trade would not actually result in emissions being reduced (see also the section below on the Green Investment Scheme).

===== "Green Investment Schemes" =====
The "Green Investment Scheme" (GIS) is a plan for achieving environmental benefits from trading surplus allowances (AAUs) under the Kyoto Protocol. The Green Investment Scheme (GIS), a mechanism in the framework of International Emissions Trading (IET), is designed to achieve greater flexibility in reaching the targets of the Kyoto Protocol while preserving environmental integrity of IET. However, using the GIS is not required under the Kyoto Protocol, and there is no official definition of the term.

Under the GIS a party to the protocol expecting that the development of its economy will not exhaust its Kyoto quota, can sell the excess of its Kyoto quota units (AAUs) to another party. The proceeds from the AAU sales should be "greened", i.e. channelled to the development and implementation of the projects either acquiring the greenhouse gases emission reductions (hard greening) or building up the necessary framework for this process (soft greening).

===== Trade in AAUs =====
Latvia was one of the front-runners of GISs. World Bank (2011) reported that Latvia has stopped offering AAU sales because of low AAU prices. In 2010, Estonia was the preferred source for AAU buyers, followed by the Czech Republic and Poland.

Japan's national policy to meet their Kyoto target includes the purchase of AAUs sold under GISs. In 2010, Japan and Japanese firms were the main buyers of AAUs. In terms of the international carbon market, trade in AAUs are a small proportion of overall market value. In 2010, 97% of trade in the international carbon market was driven by the European Union Emission Trading Scheme (EU ETS).

===== Clean Development Mechanism =====
Between 2001, which was the first year Clean Development Mechanism (CDM) projects could be registered, and 2012, the end of the first Kyoto commitment period, the CDM is expected to produce some 1.5 billion tons of carbon dioxide equivalent (CO_{2}e) in emission reductions. Most of these reductions are through renewable energy commercialisation, energy efficiency, and fuel switching (World Bank, 2010, p. 262). By 2012, the largest potential for production of CERs are estimated in China (52% of total CERs) and India (16%). CERs produced in Latin America and the Caribbean make up 15% of the potential total, with Brazil as the largest producer in the region (7%).

===== Joint Implementation =====
The formal crediting period for Joint Implementation (JI) was aligned with the first commitment period of the Kyoto Protocol, and did not start until January 2008 (Carbon Trust, 2009, p. 20). In November 2008, only 22 JI projects had been officially approved and registered. The total projected emission savings from JI by 2012 are about one tenth that of the CDM. Russia accounts for about two-thirds of these savings, with the remainder divided up roughly equally between Ukraine and the EU's New Member States. Emission savings include cuts in methane, HFC, and N_{2}O emissions.

== Details of the agreement ==
The agreement is a protocol to the United Nations Framework Convention on Climate Change (UNFCCC) adopted at the Earth Summit in Rio de Janeiro in 1992, which did not set any legally binding limitations on emissions or enforcement mechanisms. Only Parties to the UNFCCC can become Parties to the Kyoto Protocol. The Kyoto Protocol was adopted at the third session of the Conference of Parties to the UNFCCC in 1997 in Kyoto, Japan.

National emission targets specified in the Kyoto Protocol exclude international aviation and shipping. Kyoto Parties can use land use, land use change, and forestry (LULUCF) in meeting their targets. LULUCF activities are also called "sink" activities. Changes in sinks and land use can have an effect on the climate, and indeed the Intergovernmental Panel on Climate Change's Special Report on Land use, land-use change, and forestry estimates that since 1750 a third of global warming has been caused by land use change. Particular criteria apply to the definition of forestry under the Kyoto Protocol.

Forest management, cropland management, grazing land management, and revegetation are all eligible LULUCF activities under the Protocol. Annex I Parties use of forest management in meeting their targets is capped.

=== First commitment period: 2008–2012 ===
Under the Kyoto Protocol, 37 industrialized countries and the European Community (the European Union-15, made up of 15 states at the time of the Kyoto negotiations) commit themselves to binding targets for GHG emissions. The targets apply to the four greenhouse gases carbon dioxide (CO_{2}), methane (CH_{4}), nitrous oxide (N_{2}O), sulphur hexafluoride (SF_{6}), and two groups of gases, hydrofluorocarbons (HFCs) and perfluorocarbons (PFCs). The six GHG are translated into CO_{2} equivalents in determining reductions in emissions. These reduction targets are in addition to the industrial gases, chlorofluorocarbons, or CFCs, which are dealt with under the 1987 Montreal Protocol on Substances that Deplete the Ozone Layer.

Under the Protocol, only the Annex I Parties have committed themselves to national or joint reduction targets (formally called "quantified emission limitation and reduction objectives" (QELRO) – Article 4.1). Parties to the Kyoto Protocol not listed in Annex I of the convention (the non-Annex I Parties) are mostly low-income developing countries, and may participate in the Kyoto Protocol through the Clean Development Mechanism (explained below).

The emissions limitations of Annex I Parties varies between different Parties. Some Parties have emissions limitations reduce below the base year level, some have limitations at the base year level (no permitted increase above the base year level), while others have limitations above the base year level.

Emission limits do not include emissions by international aviation and shipping. Although Belarus and Turkey are listed in the convention's Annex I, they do not have emissions targets as they were not Annex I Parties when the Protocol was adopted. Kazakhstan does not have a target, but has declared that it wishes to become an Annex I Party to the convention.

Annex I countries under the Kyoto Protocol, their 2008–2012 commitments as % of base year, and 1990 emission levels (% of all Annex I countries)

Australia – 108% (2.1% of 1990 emissions)
Austria – 87%
Belarus – 95% (subject to acceptance by other parties)
Belgium – 92.5%
Bulgaria – 92% (0.6%)
Canada – 94% (3.33%) (withdrew)
Croatia – 95% ()
Czech Republic – 92% (1.24%)
Denmark – 79%
Estonia – 92% (0.28%)

Finland – 100%
France – 100%
Germany – 79%
Greece – 125%
Hungary – 94% (0.52%)
Iceland – 110% (0.02%)
Ireland – 113%
Italy – 93.5%
Japan – 94% (8.55%)
Latvia – 92% (0.17%)

Liechtenstein – 92% (0.0015%)
Lithuania – 92%
Luxembourg – 72%
Netherlands – 94%
New Zealand – 100% (0.19%)
Norway – 101% (0.26%)
Poland – 94% (3.02%)
Portugal – 92%
Romania – 92% (1.24%)

Russian Federation – 100% (17.4%)
Slovakia – 92% (0.42%)
Slovenia – 92%
Spain – 115%
Sweden – 104%
Switzerland – 92% (0.32%)
Ukraine – 100%
United Kingdom – 87.5%
United States of America – 93% (36.1%) (non-party)

For most state parties, 1990 is the base year for the national GHG inventory and the calculation of the assigned amount. However, five state parties have an alternative base year:

- Bulgaria: 1988;
- Hungary: the average of the years 1985–1987;
- Poland: 1988;
- Romania: 1989;
- Slovenia: 1986.

Annex I Parties can use a range of sophisticated "flexibility" mechanisms (see below) to meet their targets. Annex I Parties can achieve their targets by allocating reduced annual allowances to major operators within their borders, or by allowing these operators to exceed their allocations by offsetting any excess through a mechanism that is agreed by all the parties to the UNFCCC, such as by buying emission allowances from other operators which have excess emissions credits.

=== Negotiations ===
Article 4.2 of the UNFCCC commits industrialized countries to "[take] the lead" in reducing emissions. The initial aim was for industrialized countries to stabilize their emissions at 1990 levels by 2000. The failure of key industrialized countries to move in this direction was a principal reason why Kyoto moved to binding commitments.

At the first UNFCCC Conference of the Parties in Berlin, the G77 was able to push for a mandate (the "Berlin mandate") where it was recognized that:

- developed nations had contributed most to the then-current concentrations of GHGs in the atmosphere (see Greenhouse gas emissions).
- developing country emissions per-capita (i.e., average emissions per head of population) were still relatively low.
- and that the share of global emissions from developing countries would grow to meet their development needs.

During negotiations, the G-77 represented 133 developing countries. China was not a member of the group but an associate. It has since become a member.

The Berlin mandate was recognized in the Kyoto Protocol in that developing countries were not subject to emission reduction commitments in the first Kyoto commitment period. However, the large potential for growth in developing country emissions made negotiations on this issue tense. In the final agreement, the Clean Development Mechanism was designed to limit emissions in developing countries, but in such a way that developing countries do not bear the costs for limiting emissions. The general assumption was that developing countries would face quantitative commitments in later commitment periods, and at the same time, developed countries would meet their first round commitments.

==== Emissions cuts ====
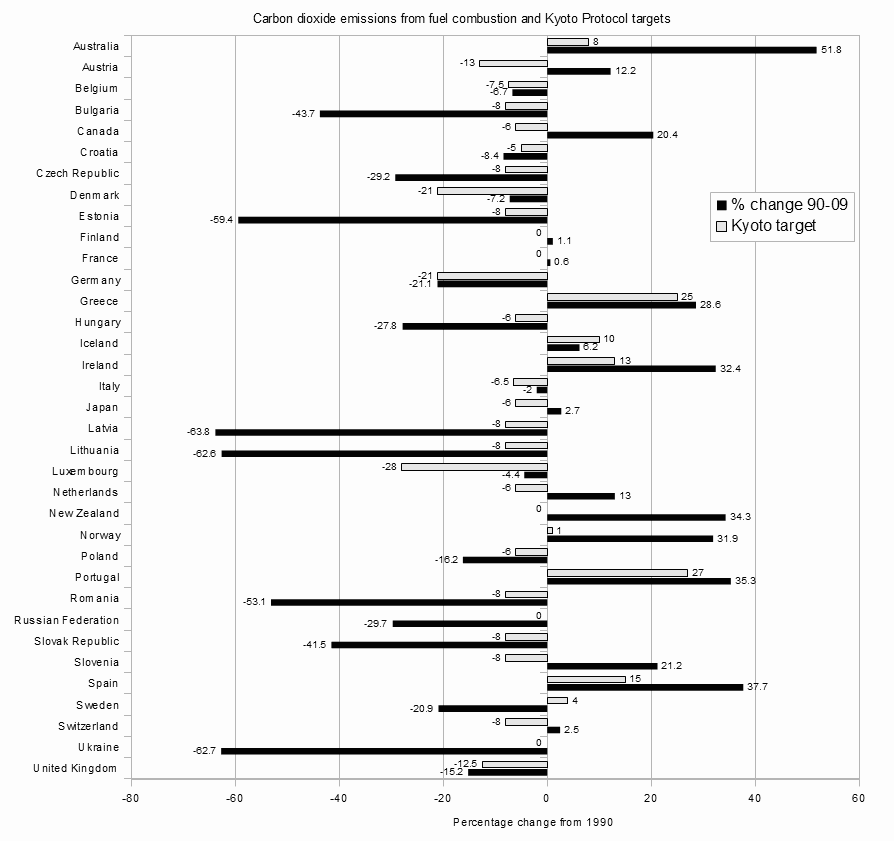
Kyoto Parties with first period (2008–12) greenhouse gas emissions limitations targets, and the percentage change in their carbon dioxide emissions from fuel combustion between 1990 and 2009. For more detailed country/region information, see Kyoto Protocol and government action.

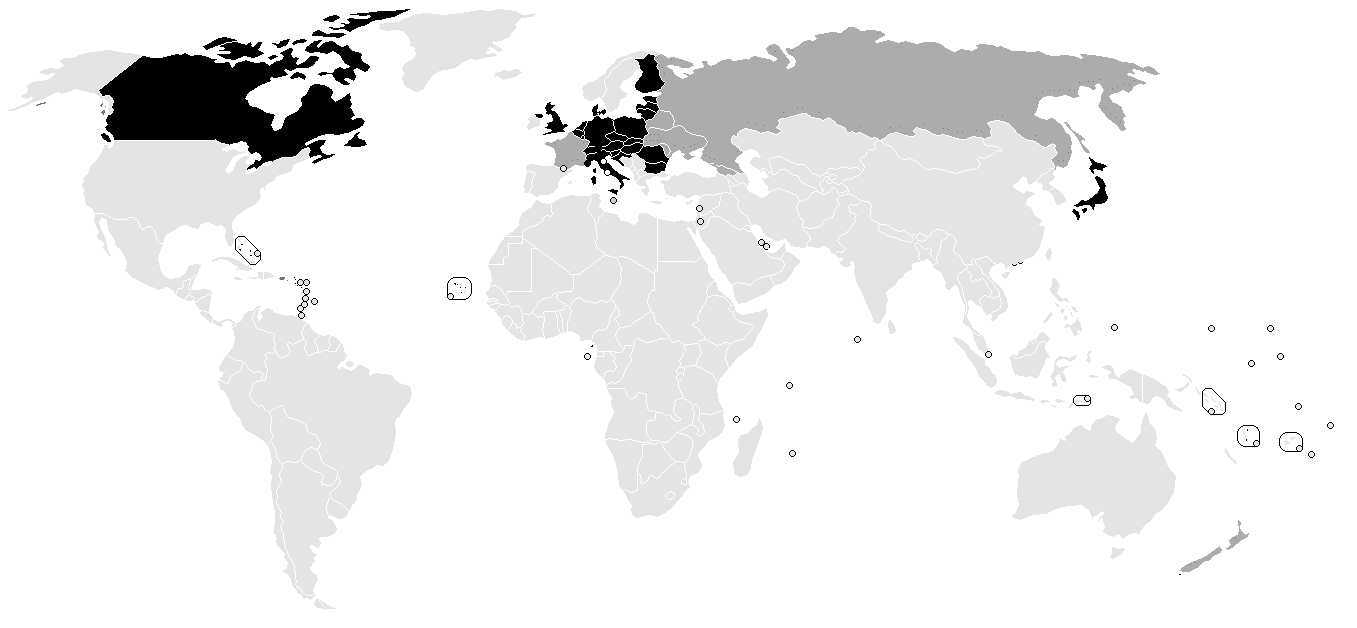
Overview map of states committed to greenhouse gas (GHG) limitations in the first Kyoto Protocol period (2008–12): Annex I Parties who have agreed to reduce their GHG emissions below their individual base year levels (see definition in this article) Annex I Parties who have agreed to cap their GHG emissions at their base year levels Non-Annex I Parties who are not obligated by caps or Annex I Parties with an emissions cap that allows their emissions to expand above their base year levels or countries that have not ratified the Kyoto Protocol For specific emission reduction commitments of Annex I Parties, see the section of the article on 2012 emission targets and "flexible mechanisms". The European Union as a whole has, in accordance with this treaty, committed itself to a reduction of 8%. However, many member states (such as Greece, Spain, Ireland and Sweden) have not committed themselves to any reduction while France has committed itself not to expand its emissions (0% reduction).

There were multiple emissions cuts proposed by UNFCCC parties during negotiations. The G77 and China were in favour of strong uniform emission cuts across the developed world. The US originally proposed for the second round of negotiations on Kyoto commitments to follow the negotiations of the first. In the end, negotiations on the second period were set to open no later than 2005. Countries over-achieving in their first period commitments can "bank" their unused allowances for use in the subsequent period.

The EU initially argued for only three GHGs to be included – CO_{2}, CH_{4}, and N_{2}O – with other gases such as HFCs regulated separately. The EU also wanted to have a "bubble" commitment, whereby it could make a collective commitment that allowed some EU members to increase their emissions, while others cut theirs.

The most vulnerable nations – the Alliance of Small Island States (AOSIS) – pushed for deep uniform cuts by developed nations, with the goal of having emissions reduced to the greatest possible extent. Countries that had supported differentiation of targets had different ideas as to how it should be calculated, and many different indicators were proposed. Two examples include differentiation of targets based on gross domestic product (GDP), and differentiation based on energy intensity (energy use per unit of economic output).

The final targets negotiated in the Protocol are the result of last minute political compromises. The targets closely match those decided by Argentinian Raul Estrada, the diplomat who chaired the negotiations. The numbers given to each Party by Chairman Estrada were based on targets already pledged by Parties, information received on latest negotiating positions, and the goal of achieving the strongest possible environmental outcome. The final targets are weaker than those proposed by some Parties, e.g., the Alliance of Small Island States and the G-77 and China, but stronger than the targets proposed by others, e.g., Canada and the United States.

==== Relation to temperature targets ====
At the 16th Conference of the Parties held in 2010, Parties to the UNFCCC agreed that future global warming should be limited below 2°C relative to the pre-industrial temperature level. One of the stabilization levels discussed in relation to this temperature target is to hold atmospheric concentrations of GHGs at 450 parts per million (ppm) CO_{2}- eq. Stabilization at 450 ppm could be associated with a 26 to 78% risk of exceeding the 2 °C target.

Scenarios assessed by Gupta et al. (2007) suggest that Annex I emissions would need to be 25% to 40% below 1990 levels by 2020, and 80% to 95% below 1990 levels by 2050. The only Annex I Parties to have made voluntary pledges in line with this are Japan (25% below 1990 levels by 2020) and Norway (30–40% below 1990 levels by 2020).

Gupta et al. (2007) also looked at what 450 ppm scenarios projected for non-Annex I Parties. Projections indicated that by 2020, non-Annex I emissions in several regions (Latin America, the Middle East, East Asia, and centrally planned Asia) would need to be substantially reduced below "business-as-usual". "Business-as-usual" are projected non-Annex I emissions in the absence of any new policies to control emissions. Projections indicated that by 2050, emissions in all non-Annex I regions would need to be substantially reduced below "business-as-usual".

=== Financial commitments ===
The Protocol also reaffirms the principle that developed countries have to pay billions of dollars, and supply technology to other countries for climate-related studies and projects. The principle was originally agreed in UNFCCC. One such project is The Adaptation Fund, which has been established by the Parties to the Kyoto Protocol of the UN Framework Convention on Climate Change to finance concrete adaptation projects and programmes in developing countries that are Parties to the Kyoto Protocol.

=== Implementation provisions ===
The protocol left several issues open to be decided later by the sixth Conference of Parties COP6 of the UNFCCC, which attempted to resolve these issues at its meeting in the Hague in late 2000, but it was unable to reach an agreement due to disputes between the European Union (who favoured a tougher implementation) and the United States, Canada, Japan and Australia (who wanted the agreement to be less demanding and more flexible).

In 2001, a continuation of the previous meeting (COP6-bis) was held in Bonn, where the required decisions were adopted. After some concessions, the supporters of the protocol (led by the European Union) managed to secure the agreement of Japan and Russia by allowing more use of carbon dioxide sinks.

COP7 was held from 29 October 2001 through 9 November 2001 in Marrakesh to establish the final details of the protocol.

The first Meeting of the Parties to the Kyoto Protocol (MOP1) was held in Montreal from 28 November to 9 December 2005, along with the 11th conference of the Parties to the UNFCCC (COP11). See United Nations Climate Change Conference.

During COP13 in Bali, 36 developed Contact Group countries (plus the EU as a party in the European Union) agreed to a 10% emissions increase for Iceland; but, since the EU's member states each have individual obligations, much larger increases (up to 27%) are allowed for some of the less developed EU countries (see below § Increase in greenhouse gas emission since 1990). Reduction limitations expired in 2013.

=== Mechanism of compliance ===
The protocol defines a mechanism of "compliance" as a "monitoring compliance with the commitments and penalties for non-compliance." According to Grubb (2003), the explicit consequences of non-compliance of the treaty are weak compared to domestic law. Yet, the compliance section of the treaty was highly contested in the Marrakesh Accords.

=== Monitoring emissions ===
Monitoring emissions in international agreements is tough as in international law, there is no police power, creating the incentive for states to find 'ways around' monitoring. The Kyoto Protocol regulated six sinks and sources of Gases. Carbon dioxide, Methane, Nirous oxide, Hydroflurocarbons, Sulfur hexafluouride and Perfluorocarbons. Monitoring these gases can become quite a challenge. Methane can be monitored and measured from irrigated rice fields and can be measured by the seedling growing up to harvest. Future implications state that this can be affected by more cost effective ways to control emissions as changes in types of fertilizer can reduce emissions by 50%. In addition to this, many countries are unable to monitor certain ways of carbon absorption through trees and soils to an accurate level.

=== Enforcing emission cuts ===
If the enforcement branch determines that an Annex I country is not in compliance with its emissions limitation, then that country is required to make up the difference during the second commitment period plus an additional 30%. In addition, that country will be suspended from making transfers under an emissions trading program.

== Ratification process ==
=== Countries that ratified the Protocol ===
The Protocol was adopted by COP 3 of UNFCCC on 11 December 1997 in Kyoto, Japan. It was opened on 16 March 1998 for signature during one year by parties to UNFCCC, when it was signed Antigua and Barbuda, Argentina, the Maldives, Samoa, St. Lucia and Switzerland. At the end of the signature period, 82 countries and the European Community had signed. Ratification (which is required to become a party to the Protocol) started on 17 September with ratification by Fiji. Countries that did not sign acceded to the convention, which has the same legal effect.

Article 25 of the Protocol specifies that the Protocol enters into force "on the ninetieth day after the date on which not less than 55 Parties to the Convention, incorporating Parties included in Annex I which accounted in total for at least 55% of the total carbon dioxide emissions for 1990 of the Annex I countries, have deposited their instruments of ratification, acceptance, approval or accession."

The EU and its Member States ratified the Protocol in May 2002. Of the two conditions, the "55 parties" clause was reached on 23 May 2002 when Iceland ratified the Protocol. The ratification by Russia on 18 November 2004 satisfied the "55%" clause and brought the treaty into force, effective 16 February 2005, after the required lapse of 90 days.

As of May 2013, 191 countries and one regional economic organization (the EC) have ratified the agreement, representing over 61.6% of the 1990 emissions from Annex I countries. One of the 191 ratifying states—Canada—has renounced the protocol.

Convention Parties

Afghanistan
Albania
Algeria
Angola
Antigua and Barbuda
Argentina
Armenia
Australia
Austria
Azerbaijan
Bahamas
Bahrain
Bangladesh
Barbados
Belarus
Belgium
Belize
Benin
Bhutan
Bolivia
Bosnia and Herzegovina
Botswana
Brazil
Brunei
Bulgaria
Burkina Faso
Myanmar
Burundi
Cambodia
Cameroon
Canada
Cape Verde
Central African Republic
Chad
Chile
China
Colombia
Comoros
Democratic Republic of the Congo
Republic of the Congo
Cook Islands
Costa Rica
Ivory Coast
Croatia
Cuba
Cyprus
Czech Republic
Denmark
Djibouti
Dominica

Dominican Republic
Ecuador
East Timor
Egypt
El Salvador
Equatorial Guinea
Eritrea
Estonia
Eswatini
Ethiopia
European Union
Fiji
Finland
France
Gabon
Gambia
Georgia
Germany
Ghana
Greece
Grenada
Guatemala
Guinea
Guinea-Bissau
Guyana
Haiti
Honduras
Hungary
Iceland
India
Indonesia
Iran
Iraq
Ireland
Israel
Italy
Jamaica
Japan
Jordan
Kazakhstan
Kenya
Kiribati
North Korea
South Korea
Kuwait
Kyrgyzstan
Laos
Latvia
Lebanon
Lesotho
Liberia
Libya

Liechtenstein
Lithuania
Luxembourg
Madagascar
Malawi
Malaysia
Maldives
Mali
Malta
Marshall Islands
Mauritania
Mauritius
Mexico
Federated States of Micronesia
Moldova
Monaco
Mongolia
Montenegro
Morocco
Mozambique
Namibia
Nauru
Nepal
Netherlands
New Zealand
Nicaragua
Niger
Nigeria
Niue
North Macedonia
Norway
Oman
Pakistan
Palau
Panama
Papua New Guinea
Paraguay
Peru
Philippines
Poland
Portugal
Qatar
Romania
Russia
Rwanda
Saint Kitts and Nevis
Saint Lucia
Saint Vincent and the Grenadines
Samoa
San Marino

São Tomé and Príncipe
Saudi Arabia
Senegal
Serbia
Seychelles
Sierra Leone
Singapore
Slovakia
Slovenia
Solomon Islands
Somalia (non-party to Kyoto)
South Africa
Spain
Sri Lanka
Sudan
Suriname
Sweden
Switzerland
Syria
Tajikistan
Tanzania
Thailand
Togo
Tonga
Trinidad and Tobago
Tunisia
Turkey
Turkmenistan
Tuvalu
Uganda
Ukraine
United Arab Emirates
United Kingdom
United States (non-party to Kyoto)
Uruguay
Uzbekistan
Vanuatu
Venezuela
Vietnam
Yemen
Zambia
Zimbabwe

- Observers:

Andorra (non-party to Kyoto)
Holy See (non-party to Kyoto)

=== Non-ratification by the US ===
The US signed the Protocol on 12 November 1998, during the Clinton presidency. To become binding in the US, however, the treaty had to be ratified by the Senate, which had already passed the 1997 non-binding Byrd-Hagel Resolution, expressing disapproval of any international agreement that did not require developing countries to make emission reductions and "would seriously harm the economy of the United States". The resolution passed 95–0. Therefore, even though the Clinton administration signed the treaty, it was never submitted to the Senate for ratification.

At the outset of the Bush administration, Senators Chuck Hagel, Jesse Helms, Larry Craig, and Pat Roberts wrote a letter to President George W. Bush seeking to identify his position on the Kyoto Protocol and climate change policy. In a letter dated March 13, 2001, President Bush responded that his "Administration takes the issue of global climate change very seriously", but that "I oppose the Kyoto Protocol because it exempts 80 percent of the world, including major population centers such as China and India, from compliance, and would cause serious harm to the U.S. economy. The Senate's vote, 95-0, shows that there is a clear consensus that the Kyoto Protocol is an unfair and ineffective means of addressing global climate change concerns." The administration also questioned the scientific certainty around climate change and cited potential harms of emissions reduction to the US economy.

The Tyndall Centre for Climate Change Research reported in 2001:

This policy reversal received a massive wave of criticism that was quickly picked up by the international media. Environmental groups blasted the White House, while Europeans and Japanese alike expressed deep concern and regret. ... Almost all world leaders (e.g. China, Japan, South Africa, Pacific Islands, etc.) expressed their disappointment at Bush's decision.

In response to this criticism, Bush stated: "I was responding to reality, and reality is the nation has got a real problem when it comes to energy". The Tyndall Centre called this "an overstatement used to cover up the big benefactors of this policy reversal, i.e., the US oil and coal industry, which has a powerful lobby with the administration and conservative Republican congressmen."

As of 2023, the US is the only signatory that has not ratified the Protocol. The US accounted for 36.1% of emissions in 1990. As such, for the treaty to go into legal effect without US ratification, it would require a coalition including the EU, Russia, Japan, and small parties. A deal, without the US Administration, was reached in the Bonn climate talks (COP-6.5), held in 2001.

=== Withdrawal of Canada ===
In 2011, Canada, Japan and Russia stated that they would not take on further Kyoto targets. The Canadian government announced its withdrawal—possible at any time three years after ratification—from the Kyoto Protocol on 12 December 2011, effective 15 December 2012. Canada was committed to cutting its greenhouse emissions to 6% below 1990 levels by 2012, but in 2009 emissions were 17% higher than in 1990. The Harper government prioritized oil sands development in Alberta, and deprioritized the reduction of greenhouse emissions. Environment minister Peter Kent cited Canada's liability to "enormous financial penalties" under the treaty unless it withdrew. He also suggested that the recently signed Durban agreement may provide an alternative way forward. The Harper government claimed it would find a "Made in Canada" solution. Canada's decision received a generally negative response from representatives of other ratifying countries.

=== Other states and territories where the treaty was not applicable ===
Andorra, Palestine, South Sudan, the United States and, following their withdrawal on 15 December 2012, Canada are the only UNFCCC Parties that are not party to the Protocol. Furthermore, the Protocol is not applied to UNFCCC observer the Holy See. Although the Kingdom of the Netherlands approved the protocol for the whole Kingdom, it did not deposit an instrument of ratification for Aruba, Curaçao, Sint Maarten or the Caribbean Netherlands.

== Country types and their emissions ==
=== Annex I countries ===
Total aggregate GHG emissions excluding emissions/removals from land use, land use change and forestry (LULUCF, i.e., carbon storage in forests and soils) for all Annex I Parties (see list below) including the United States taken together decreased from 19.0 to 17.8 thousand teragrams (Tg, which is equal to 10^{9} kg) CO_{2} equivalent, a decline of 6.0% during the 1990–2008 period. Several factors have contributed to this decline. The first is due to the economic restructuring in the Annex I Economies in Transition (the EITs – see Intergovernmental Emissions Trading for the list of EITs). Over the period 1990–1999, emissions fell by 40% in the EITs following the collapse of central planning in the former Soviet Union and east European countries. This led to a massive contraction of their heavy industry-based economies, with associated reductions in their fossil fuel consumption and emissions.

Emissions growth in Annex I Parties have also been limited due to policies and measures (PaMs). In particular, PaMs were strengthened after 2000, helping to enhance energy efficiency and develop renewable energy sources. Energy use also decreased during the economic crisis in 2007–2008.

==== Annex I parties with targets ====
Percentage changes in emissions from the base year (1990 for most countries) for Annex I Parties with Kyoto targets
| Country | Kyoto target 2008–2012 | Kyoto target 2013–2020 | GHG emissions 2008–2012 including LULUCF | GHG emissions 2008–2012 excluding LULUCF |
|---|---|---|---|---|
| Australia | +8 | −0.5 | +3.2 | +30.3 |
| Austria | −13 | −20 | +3.2 | +4.9 |
| Belgium | −8 | −20 | −13.9 | −14.0 |
| Bulgaria | −8 | −20 | −53.4 | −52.8 |
| Canada (withdrew) | −6 | N/A | +18.5 | +18.5 |
| Croatia | −5 | −20 | −10.8 | −7.5 |
| Czech Republic | −8 | −20 | −30.6 | −30.0 |
| Denmark | −21 | −20 | −17.3 | −14.8 |
| Estonia | −8 | −20 | −54.2 | −55.3 |
| Finland | 0 | −20 | −5.5 | −4.7 |
| France | 0 | −20 | −10.5 | −10.0 |
| Germany | −21 | −20 | −24.3 | −23.6 |
| Greece | +25 | −20 | +11.5 | +11.9 |
| Hungary | −6 | −20 | −43.7 | −41.8 |
| Iceland | +10 | −20 | +10.2 | +19.4 |
| Ireland | +13 | −20 | +11.0 | +5.1 |
| Italy | −6 | −20 | −7.0 | −4.0 |
| Japan | −6 | N/A | −2.5 | +1.4 |
| Latvia | −8 | −20 | −61.2 | −56.4 |
| Liechtenstein | −8 | −16 | +4.1 | +2.4 |
| Lithuania | −8 | −20 | −57.9 | −55.6 |
| Luxembourg | −28 | −20 | −9.3 | −8.7 |
| Monaco | −8 | −22 | −12.5 | −12.5 |
| Netherlands | −6 | −20 | −6.2 | −6.4 |
| New Zealand | 0 | N/A | −2.7 | +20.4 |
| Norway | +1 | −16 | +4.6 | +7.5 |
| Poland | −6 | −20 | −29.7 | −28.8 |
| Portugal | +27 | −20 | +5.5 | +22.4 |
| Romania | −8 | −20 | −57.0 | −55.7 |
| Russia | 0 | N/A | −36.3 | −32.7 |
| Slovakia | −8 | −20 | −37.2 | −36.8 |
| Slovenia | −8 | −20 | −9.7 | −3.2 |
| Spain | +15 | −20 | +20.0 | +23.7 |
| Sweden | +4 | −20 | −18.2 | −15.3 |
| Switzerland | −8 | −15.8 | −3.9 | −0.8 |
| Ukraine | 0 | −24 | −57.1 | −56.6 |
| United Kingdom | −13 | −20 | −23.0 | −22.6 |
| United States (did not ratify) | −7 | N/A | +9.5 | +9.5 |

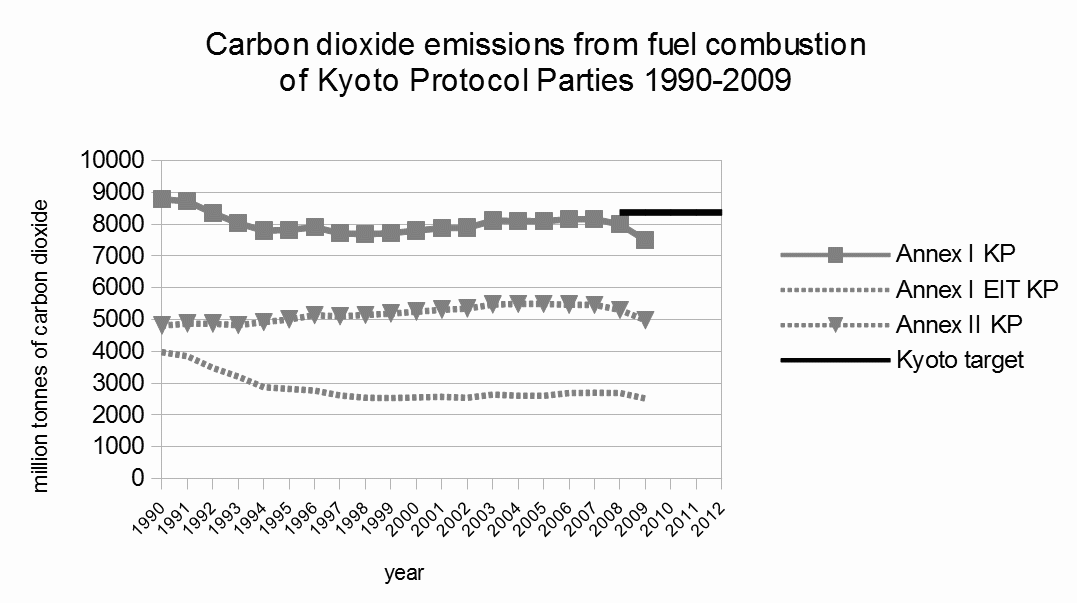
CO_{2} emissions from fuel combustion of Annex I Kyoto Protocol (KP) Parties, 1990–2009. Total Annex I KP emissions are shown, along with emissions of Annex II KP and Annex I EITs.

Collectively the group of industrialized countries committed to a Kyoto target, i.e., the Annex I countries excluding the US, had a target of reducing their GHG emissions by 4.2% on average for the period 2008–2012 relative to the base year, which in most cases is 1990.

As noted in the preceding section, between 1990 and 1999, there was a large reduction in the emissions of the EITs. The reduction in the EITs is largely responsible for the total (aggregate) reduction (excluding LULUCF) in emissions of the Annex I countries, excluding the US. Emissions of the Annex II countries (Annex I minus the EIT countries) have experienced a limited increase in emissions from 1990 to 2006, followed by stabilization and a more marked decrease from 2007 onwards. The emissions reductions in the early nineties by the 12 EIT countries who have since joined the EU, assist the present EU-27 in meeting its collective Kyoto target.

In December 2011, Canada's environment minister, Peter Kent, formally announced that Canada would withdraw from the Kyoto accord a day after the end of the 2011 United Nations Climate Change Conference (see the section on the withdrawal of Canada).

==== Annex I parties without Kyoto targets ====
Belarus, Malta, and Turkey are Annex I Parties but did not have first-round Kyoto targets. The US had a Kyoto target of a 7% reduction relative to the 1990 level, but has not ratified the treaty. If the US had ratified the Kyoto Protocol, the average percentage reduction in total GHG emissions for the Annex I group would have been a 5.2% reduction relative to the base year.

=== Non-Annex I ===
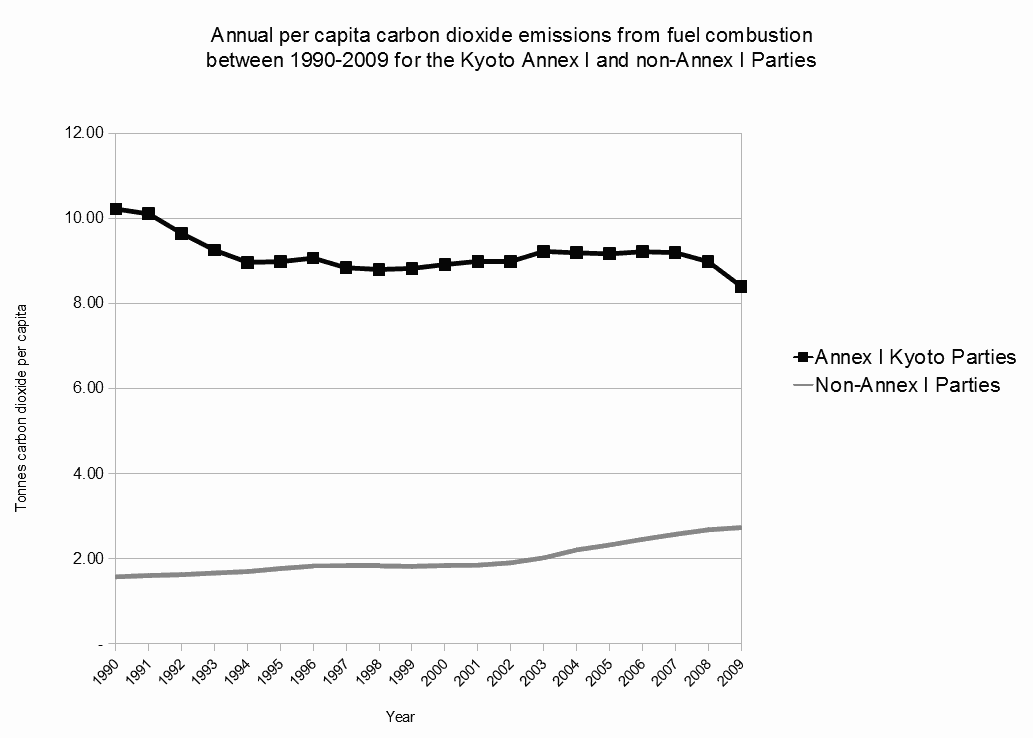
Annual per capita carbon dioxide emissions (i.e., average emissions per person) from fuel combustion between 1990 and 2009 for the Kyoto Annex I and non-Annex I Parties

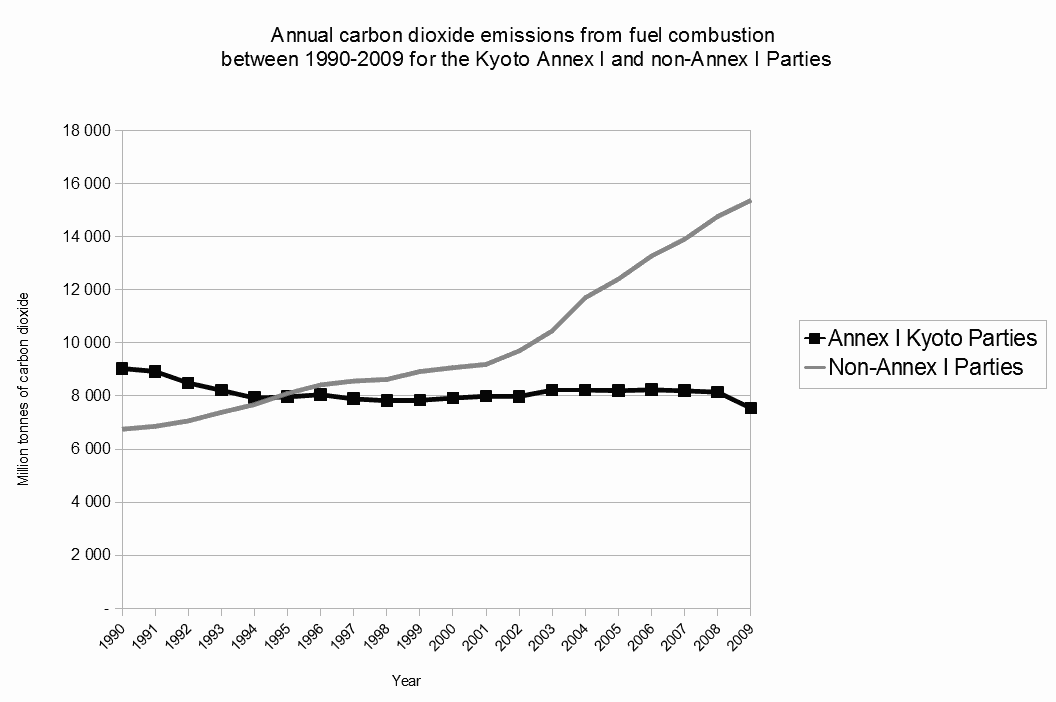
Annual carbon dioxide emissions from fuel combustion between 1990 and 2009 for the Kyoto Annex I and non-Annex I Parties

UNFCCC (2005) compiled and synthesized information reported to it by non-Annex I Parties. Most non-Annex I Parties belonged in the low-income group, with very few classified as middle-income. Most Parties included information on policies relating to sustainable development. Sustainable development priorities mentioned by non-Annex I Parties included poverty alleviation and access to basic education and health care. Many non-Annex I Parties are making efforts to amend and update their environmental legislation to include global concerns such as climate change.

A few Parties, e.g., South Africa and Iran, stated their concern over how efforts to reduce emissions by Annex I Parties could adversely affect their economies. The economies of these countries are highly dependent on income generated from the production, processing, and export of fossil fuels.

GHG emissions, excluding land use change and forestry (LUCF), reported by 122 non-Annex I Parties for the year 1994 or the closest year reported, totalled 11.7 billion tonnes (billion = 1,000,000,000) of CO_{2}-eq. CO_{2} was the largest proportion of emissions (63%), followed by methane (26%) and nitrous oxide (N_{2}O) (11%).

The energy sector was the largest source of emissions for 70 Parties, whereas for 45 Parties the agriculture sector was the largest. Per capita emissions (in tonnes of CO_{2}-eq, excluding LUCF) averaged 2.8 tonnes for the 122 non-Annex I Parties.

- The Africa region's aggregate emissions were 1.6 billion tonnes, with per capita emissions of 2.4 tonnes.
- The Asia and Pacific region's aggregate emissions were 7.9 billion tonnes, with per capita emissions of 2.6 tonnes.
- The Latin America and Caribbean region's aggregate emissions were 2 billion tonnes, with per capita emissions of 4.6 tonnes.
- The "other" region includes Albania, Armenia, Azerbaijan, Georgia, Malta, Moldova, and North Macedonia. Their aggregate emissions were 0.1 billion tonnes, with per capita emissions of 5.1 tonnes.

Parties reported a high level of uncertainty in LUCF emissions, but in aggregate, there appeared to only be a small difference of 1.7% with and without LUCF. With LUCF, emissions were 11.9 billion tonnes, without LUCF, total aggregate emissions were 11.7 billion tonnes.

== Problem areas ==
=== Views and criticism of the Protocol ===
Gupta et al. (2007) assessed the literature on climate change policy. They found that no authoritative assessments of the UNFCCC or its Protocol asserted that these agreements had, or will, succeed in solving the climate problem. In these assessments, it was assumed that the UNFCCC or its Protocol would not be changed. The Framework Convention and its Protocol include provisions for future policy actions to be taken.

Gupta et al. (2007) described the Kyoto first-round commitments as "modest", stating that they acted as a constraint on the treaty's effectiveness. It was suggested that subsequent Kyoto commitments could be made more effective with measures aimed at achieving deeper cuts in emissions, as well as having policies applied to a larger share of global emissions. In 2008, countries with a Kyoto cap made up less than one-third of annual global carbon dioxide emissions from fuel combustion.

World Bank (2010) commented on how the Kyoto Protocol had only had a slight effect on curbing global emissions growth. The treaty was negotiated in 1997, but in 2006, energy-related carbon dioxide emissions had grown by 24%. World Bank (2010) also stated that the treaty had provided only limited financial support to developing countries to assist them in reducing their emissions and adapting to climate change.

Some environmentalists have supported the Kyoto Protocol because it is "the only game in town", and possibly because they expect that future emission reduction commitments may demand more stringent emission reductions (Aldy et al.., 2003, p. 9). In 2001, seventeen national science academies stated that ratification of the Protocol represented a "small but essential first step towards stabilising atmospheric concentrations of greenhouse gases." Some environmentalists and scientists have criticized the existing commitments for being too weak (Grubb, 2000, p. 5).

The United States (under former President George W. Bush) and Australia (initially, under former Prime Minister John Howard) did not ratify the Kyoto treaty. According to Stern (2006), their decision was based on the lack of quantitative emission commitments for emerging economies. Australia, under former Prime Minister Kevin Rudd, has since ratified the treaty, which took effect in March 2008.

=== Compliance ===
38 developed countries committed to limiting their greenhouse gas emissions. Because the United States did not ratify and Canada withdrew, the emission limits remained in force for 36 countries. All of them complied with the Protocol. However, nine countries (Austria, Denmark, Iceland, Japan, Lichtenstein, Luxembourg, Norway, Spain and Switzerland) had to resort to the flexibility mechanisms because their national emissions were slightly greater than their targets.

In total, the 36 countries that fully participated in the Protocol were committed to reducing their aggregate emissions by 4% from the 1990 base year. Their average annual emissions in 2008–2012 were 24.2% below the 1990 level. Hence, they surpassed their aggregate commitment by a large margin. If the United States and Canada are included, the emissions decreased by 11.8%. The large reductions were mainly thanks to the dissolution of the Soviet Union, which reduced the emissions of the Eastern Bloc by tens of percents in the early 1990s. In addition, the 2008 financial crisis significantly reduced emissions during the first Kyoto commitment period.

The 36 countries that were committed to emission reductions only accounted for 24% of the global greenhouse gas emissions in 2010. Even though these countries significantly reduced their emissions during the Kyoto commitment period, other countries increased their emissions so much that the global emissions increased by 32% from 1990 to 2010.

=== Emission trends in developing countries ===
In several large developing countries and fast growing economies (China, India, Thailand, Indonesia, Egypt, and Iran) GHG emissions have increased rapidly (PBL, 2009). For example, emissions in China have risen strongly over the 1990–2005 period, often by more than 10% year. Emissions per-capita in non-Annex I countries are still, for the most part, much lower than in industrialized countries. Non-Annex I countries do not have quantitative emission reduction commitments, but they are committed to mitigation actions. China, for example, has had a national policy programme to reduce emissions growth, which included the closure of old, less efficient coal-fired power plants.

=== Views on the flexibility mechanisms ===
Another area which has been commented on is the role of the Kyoto flexibility mechanisms – carbon emission trading, Joint Implementation, and the Clean Development Mechanism (CDM). The flexibility mechanisms have attracted both positive and negative comments.

One of the arguments made in favour of the flexibility mechanisms is that they can reduce the costs incurred by Annex I Parties in meeting their Kyoto commitments. Criticisms of flexibility have, for example, included the ineffectiveness of emissions trading in promoting investment in non-fossil energy sources, and adverse impacts of CDM projects on local communities in developing countries.

China, India, Indonesia and Brazil were not required to reduce their CO_{2} emissions. The remaining signatory countries were not obliged to implement a common framework nor specific measures, but to reach an emission reduction target for which they can benefit of a secondary market for carbon credits multilaterally exchanged from each other. The Emissions-trading Scheme (ETS) allowed countries to host polluting industries and to buy from other countries the property of their environmental merits and virtuous patterns.

A 2021 review considers both the institutional design and the political strategies that have affected the adoption of the Kyoto protocol. It concludes that the Kyoto protocol's relatively small impact on global carbon dioxide emissions reflects a number of factors, including "deliberate political strategy, unequal power, and the absence of leadership" among and within nations. The efforts of fossil fuel interests and conservative think tanks to spread disinformation and climate change denial have influenced public opinion and political action both within the United States and beyond it. The direct lobbying of fossil fuel companies and their funding of political actors have slowed political action to address climate change at regional, national, and international levels.

== Amendment and successor ==
In the non-binding "Washington Declaration" agreed on 16 February 2007, heads of governments from Canada, France, Germany, Italy, Japan, Russia, the United Kingdom, the United States, Brazil, China, India, Mexico and South Africa agreed in principle on the outline of a successor to the Kyoto Protocol. They envisaged a global cap-and-trade system that would apply to both industrialized nations and developing countries, and initially hoped that it would be in place by 2009.

The United Nations Climate Change Conference in Copenhagen in December 2009 was one of the annual series of UN meetings that followed the 1992 Earth Summit in Rio. In 1997 the talks led to the Kyoto Protocol, and the conference in Copenhagen was considered to be the opportunity to agree a successor to Kyoto that would bring about meaningful carbon cuts.

The 2010 Cancún agreements include voluntary pledges made by 76 developed and developing countries to control their emissions of greenhouse gases. In 2010, these 76 countries were collectively responsible for 85% of annual global emissions.

By May 2012, the US, Japan, Russia, and Canada had indicated they would not sign up to a second Kyoto commitment period. In November 2012, Australia confirmed it would participate in a second commitment period under the Kyoto Protocol and New Zealand confirmed that it would not.

New Zealand's climate minister Tim Groser said the 15-year-old Kyoto Protocol was outdated, and that New Zealand was "ahead of the curve" in looking for a replacement that would include developing nations. Non-profit environmental organisations such as the World Wildlife Fund criticised New Zealand's decision to pull out.

On 8 December 2012, at the end of the 2012 United Nations Climate Change Conference, an agreement was reached to extend the Protocol to 2020 and to set a date of 2015 for the development of a successor document, to be implemented from 2020 (see lede for more information). The outcome of the Doha talks has received a mixed response, with small island states critical of the overall package. The Kyoto second commitment period applies to about 11% of annual global emissions of greenhouse gases. Other results of the conference include a timetable for a global agreement to be adopted by 2015 which includes all countries. At the Doha meeting of the parties to the UNFCCC on 8 December 2012, the European Union chief climate negotiator, Artur Runge-Metzger, pledged to extend the treaty, binding on the 27 European Member States, up to the year 2020 pending an internal ratification procedure.

Ban Ki Moon, Secretary General of the United Nations, called on world leaders to come to an agreement on halting global warming during the 69th Session of the UN General Assembly on 23 September 2014 in New York. The next climate summit was held in Paris in 2015, out of which emerged the Paris Agreement, the successor to the Kyoto Protocol.

== See also ==
- Clean Development Mechanism
- Copenhagen Accord
- Kyoto Protocol and government action
- List of climate change initiatives
- Supplementarity
