= Canada and the Kyoto Protocol =

Map of Canada showing the increases in annual GHG emissions by province/territory as of 2008, compared to the 1990 base year 50%+ increase 30%–50% increase 20%–30% increase 10%–20% increase 0%–10% increase 0%–10% decrease Each square represents 2 tonnes CO_{2} eq. per capita

Canada was active in the negotiations that led to the Kyoto Protocol in 1997. The Liberal government that signed the accord in 1997 ratified it in parliament in 2002. Canada's Kyoto target was a 6% total reduction in greenhouse gas (GHG) emissions by 2012, compared to 1990 levels of 461 megatonnes (Mt) (Government of Canada (GC) 1994). (Note: UNFCCC (April 21, 2011). Report of the individual review of the annual submission of Canada submitted in 2010 (PDF) (Report). United Nations Framework Convention on Climate Change."'Base year' refers to the base year under the Kyoto Protocol, which is 1990 for all gases.") Despite signing the accord, greenhouse gas emissions increased approximately 24.1% between 1990 and 2008. In 2011, Conservative Prime Minister Stephen Harper withdrew Canada from the Kyoto Protocol.

Debates surrounding the implementation of the Kyoto Protocol in Canada is influenced by the nature of relationships between national, provincial, territorial and municipal jurisdictions. The federal government can negotiate multilateral agreements and enact legislation to respect their terms. However, the provinces have jurisdiction in terms of energy and therefore, to a large extent, climate change. In 1980, when the National Energy Program was introduced, the country was almost torn apart, deeply dividing the provinces along an east–west axis. Since then, no federal government has implemented an intergovernmental, long-term, cohesive energy plan.

== Harper administration ==
Some argue that when Prime Minister Stephen Harper took office in 2006, his strong opposition to the Kyoto Accord, his market-centred policies and "deliberate indifference" contributed to a dramatic rise in GHG emissions. Harper had previously denounced the Kyoto Protocol as a "socialist scheme to suck money out of wealth-producing nations" and pledged to fight against it in a 2002 fundraising letter addressed to Canadian Alliance members.

Harper opposed the imposition of binding targets at the 2007 Bali Conference unless such targets were also imposed on such countries as China and India, which are exempt from GHG reduction requirements under the terms of the Kyoto Protocol. Although Canadian GHG emissions fell in 2008 and 2009 due to the global recession, Canada's emissions were expected to increase again with the economic recovery, fueled largely by the expansion of the oil sands.

In 2009, Canada signed the Copenhagen Accord, which, unlike the Kyoto Accord, is a non-binding agreement. Canada agreed to reduce its GHG emissions by 17% from its 2005 levels by 2020, which translates to a reduction of 124 megatonnes (Mt).

In December 2011, the Ministry of the Environment Peter Kent announced Canada's withdrawal from the Kyoto Accord one day after negotiators from nearly 200 countries meeting in Durban, South Africa, at the 2011 United Nations Climate Change Conference completed a marathon of climate talks to establish a new treaty to limit carbon emissions. The Durban talks were leading to a new binding treaty with targets for all countries to take effect in 2020.

Kent argued that "The Kyoto protocol does not cover the world's largest two emitters, the United States and China, and therefore cannot work." In 2010 Canada, Japan and Russia said they would not accept new Kyoto commitments. Canada is the only country to repudiate the Kyoto Accord. Kent argued that since Canada could not meet targets, it needed to avoid the $14 billion in penalties for not achieving its goals. This decision drew a widespread international response. Finally, the cost of compliance has been estimated 20 times lower. States for which the emissions are not covered by the Kyoto Protocol (the US and China) have the largest emissions, being responsible for 41% of the Kyoto Protocol. China's emissions increased by over 200% from 1990 to 2009. Canadian Council of Chief Executives (Note: Brownlee, Jamie (2005). Ruling Canada: Corporate Cohesion and Democracy. Halifax: Fernwood Publishing.The Canadian business community has taken the most active interest in politics at the CEO level than any other business community in the world (Tom D'Acquino, CEO of the Canadian Council of Chief Executives cited in Brownlee 2005: 9 Newman 1998:159-160). And this interest and influence have been on the rise in the last decades. Canada's business community has had more influence on Canadian public policy in the years 1995-2005 than in any other period since 1900. "Look at what we stand for and look at what all the governments, all the major parties ... have done, and what they want to do. They have adopted the agendas we've been fighting for in the past few decades (Aquino cited in Brownlee 2005: 12 Newman 1998:151).") VP John Dillon argued that a further extension of Kyoto would not be effective, as many countries, not just Canada, were not on track to meet their 1997 Kyoto commitments to reduce emissions.

The Bill C-38 Jobs, Growth and Long-term Prosperity Act passed in June 2012 (informally referred to as "Bill C-38"), a 2012 omnibus Bill and Budget Implementation Act, repealed the Kyoto Protocol Implementation Act.

According to the report entitled "Environment: GHG Emissions Per Capita" (July 2011), Canada ranks "15th out of 17 countries for greenhouse gas (GHG) emissions per capita and earns a 'D' grade. Canada's per capita GHG emissions increased by 3.2 percent between 1990 and 2008, while total GHG emissions in Canada grew 24 percent. The largest contributor to Canada's GHG emissions is the energy sector, which includes power generation (heat and electricity), transportation, and fugitive sources."

== Timeline ==
- December 13, 2011: Canada became the first signatory to announce its withdrawal from the Kyoto Protocol. (Note: "Canada and Kyoto: A history of the country's involvement and its greenhouse gas emissions" (interactive). CBC News. December 13, 2011. This contains an interactive timeline.)
- 2009: Canada signed the Copenhagen Accord. Unlike the Kyoto Accord, this is a non-binding agreement. Canada agreed to reduce its GHG emissions by 17% from its 2005 levels by 2020 to 607 megatonnes (Mt).
- February 2009: The (CED) was established between Canada and the United States "to enhance joint collaboration on the development of clean energy science and technologies to reduce greenhouse gases and combat climate change".
- December 3–15, 2007: At the United Nations Climate Change Conference in Bali, Indonesia, Environment Minister John Baird argued that Canada would not attempt to reach its Kyoto targets because it was impossible to reach them. Baird was heavily criticized for impeding progress on 'the Bali Action Plan'.
- 2007: The Canadian federal government introduced the Clean Air Act.
- January 2006: Stephen Harper's Conservative government took power. Harper abandoned Canada's Kyoto obligations in favour of his "Made in Canada" plan. In his first year, GHG emissions rose to an all-time high of 748 Mt.
- 2004: The federal government launched the One Tonne Challenge.
- December 17, 2002: Canada officially ratified the Kyoto Accord under Prime Minister Jean Chrétien's Liberal government.
- 2001: The United States did not ratify the Kyoto Accord, leaving Canada as the only nation in the Americas with a binding emissions-reduction obligation.
- 2000: The federal government introduced the Action Plan 2000 on Climate Change.
- 1980: Prime Minister Pierre Trudeau introduced the controversial energy policy, the National Energy Program (NEP). Tim Flannery, the author of The Weathermakers, argued that since the NEP, with its tidal wave of a negative western response, which nearly tore the country apart, no federal government—Liberal or Conservative—has been brave enough to forge a new energy policy.

== Emission profiles and trends ==
Canada is "one of the highest per-capita emitters in the OECD and has higher energy intensity, adjusted for purchasing power parity, than any IEA country, largely the result of its size, climate (i.e. energy demands), and resource-based economy. Conversely, the Canadian power sector is one of OECD's lowest emitting generation portfolios, producing over three-quarters of its electricity from renewable energy sources and nuclear energy combined." Canada GHG emissions increased from 1997 through 2001, dipped in 2002, increased again, then decreased in 2005. By 2007 they had reached an all-time high of 748 Mt followed by a decrease. (Note: "Canada and Kyoto: A history of the country's involvement and its greenhouse gas emissions" (interactive). CBC News. December 13, 2011. Data retrieved from CBC interactive graph based on Environment Canada, Statistics Canada.)

- 1990 (461 Mt)
- 1997 (671 Mt)
- 1998 (677 Mt)
- 2000 (716 Mt)
- 2001 (709 Mt)
- 2002 (715 Mt)
- 2003 (738 Mt)
- 2004 (742 Mt)
- 2005 (747 Mt); 33% higher than the Kyoto target (Note: Fritzsche, Jeff (2008). Canadian industry's expenditures to reduce greenhouse gas emissions (Report). Statistics Canada."Much of the increase in emissions is a result of the extraction, processing, refinement and transportation of oil and gas.")
- 2006 (719 Mt) (Note: "A Climate Change Plan for the Purposes of the Kyoto Protocol Implementation Act" (PDF). Environment Canada. May 2008. 721 Mt (29% above Kyoto targets))
- 2007 (748 Mt)
- 2008 (732 Mt)
- 2009 (690 Mt)

These are the emission profiles based on the United Nations Framework Convention on Climate Change Review of Canada's Annual Report, which includes data from 1990 to 2008.

- Total GHG emissions amounted to 734,566.32 Gg CO_{2} eq
- Total GHG emissions increased by 24.1% between t1990 and 2008.

=== Overview ===
Canada's overall greenhouse gas (GHG) emissions by gas and percentage are:

- Carbon dioxide (CO_{2}) (78.1%)
- Methane (CH_{4}) (13.4%)
- Nitrous oxide (N_{2}O) (7.1%)
- Hydrofluorocarbons (HFCs), perfluorocarbons (PFCs) and sulphur hexafluoride (SF_{6}) (1.4%)

Canada's overall greenhouse gas (GHG) emissions by economic sector and percentage are:

- Energy sector (81.3%)
  - Transportation
  - Stationary combustion sources
  - Fugitive sources
- Agriculture sector (8.5%)
- Industrial processes sector (7.2%)
- Waste sector (2.9%)
- Solvent and other product use sector (0.04%)
- Land-use change and forestry sector

The following table lists CO_{2} equivalent emissions by province and per capita for the year 2012.

Province	Population (thousands)	Emissions (Mt CO_{2} equivalent)	Emissions per cap. (tonnes CO_{2} equiv.)
British Columbia	4,542.5	60.1	13.2
Alberta	3,888.6	249.3	64.1
Saskatchewan	1,087.3	74.8	68.8
Manitoba	1,250.5	21.1	16.9
Ontario	13,410.1	166.9	12.4
Quebec	8,084.8	78.3	9.68
Newfoundland and Labrador	526.9	8.7	17
New Brunswick	756.8	16.4	21.7
Nova Scotia	944.8	19.0	20.1
Prince Edward Island	145.3	1.9	13
Yukon	36.2	0.4	10
Northwest Territories and Nunavut*	78.3	1.7	22

- Emissions data for Nunavut and Northwest territories are not given separately.

=== Energy sector ===
==== Fuel combustion activities ====
===== Hydrocarbon consumption =====
Canada is the third-largest per capita greenhouse gas polluter after Australia and the United States. The main cause of these high GHG emissions is Canada's hydrocarbon consumption—at 8,300 kilograms of crude oil equivalent per person per year, the highest in the world.

==== Fugitive emissions from fuels ====
Fugitive emissions, such as leaks, venting and accidents, from oil and gas operations contribute 9% of energy sector emissions.

=== Factors affecting emissions ===
==== Economic factors ====
Canada is the fifth-largest energy producer in the world, producing and export quantities of crude oil, natural gas, electricity, and coal, which creates challenges in meeting emissions standards. The energy industry generates about a quarter of Canada's export revenues and employs some 650,000 people across the country.

==== Geographic considerations ====
Canada's geography, with its vast distances between many communities combined with the length and coldness of Canadian winters, contributes to Canada's high hydrocarbon consumption. As temperatures drop, fuel consumption rises and fuel efficiency drops. However, this has been largely taken into account by the structure of the Kyoto Protocol, which assigns targets depending on the given country's own emissions in 1990. Since in 1990 Canada was already vast and even colder than today, its emissions were already much higher, and, consequently, Canada's 2012 Kyoto target much more forgiving, than the targets of other countries with comparable population sizes. In fact, the 1990 emission benchmark not only implicitly accounts for objective factors, like climate and distances, but also rewards wasteful lifestyle choices—the preference to live in low-density suburbs and in large, energy-inefficient, individual homes did inflate Canada's 1990 emissions, and, therefore, further increased Canada's allowable emissions under the Kyoto Protocol.

Of the 162 Mt of emissions resulting from transportation sources in 2008, over half, or about 12 percent, of Canada's total emissions can be attributed to passenger cars and light trucks. Emissions from these areas made up approximately 55 percent of Canada's total transportation emissions in 2008: light trucks (29.2%), heavy-duty trucks (27%), cars (25.4%), domestic aviation (5.3%), rail (4.4%), domestic marine (3.6%), other (5.2%). Environment Canada, National GHG Inventory.

Another 14 percent come from non-energy sources. The rest comes from the production and manufacture of energy and power. The following table summarizes forecast changes to annual emissions by sector in megatonnes.

Sector	2004 total	2004–2010 increase	2010–2020 increase	2020 total
Upstream oil and gas	127	7	−10	124
Upgrading and refining heavier oil	29	34	25	87
Power generation	130	1	−4	126
Industrial	106	4	8	118
Commercial and residential	83	1	13	97
Transportation	193	16	25	235
Non-energy (mostly agriculture)	108	8	11	127

According to Canada's Energy Outlook, the Natural Resources Canada (NRCan) report, Canada's GHG emissions will increase by 139 million tonnes between 2004 and 2020, with more than a third of the total coming from petroleum production and refining. Upstream emissions will decline slightly, primarily from gas field depletion and from increasing production of coalbed methane, which requires less processing than conventional natural gas. Meanwhile, emissions from unconventional resources and refining will soar.

== See also ==
- Climate change in Canada
- Energy policy of Canada
- United States and the Paris Agreement
