= List of parties to the Kyoto Protocol =

Participation in the Kyoto Protocol Annex B parties with binding targets in the second period Annex B parties with binding targets in the first period but not the second non-Annex B parties without binding targets Annex B parties with binding targets in the first period but which withdrew from the Protocol Signatories to the Protocol that have not ratified Other UN member states and observers that are not party to the Protocol

As of June 2013, there are 192 parties to the Kyoto Protocol to the United Nations Framework Convention on Climate Change, which aims to combat global warming. This total includes 191 states (189 United Nations member states as well as the Cook Islands and Niue) and one supranational union (the European Union). Canada renounced the protocol effective 15 December 2012 and ceased to be a member from that date.

With the Protocol's 2008-2012 commitment period expiring, the Doha Amendment to the Kyoto Protocol was agreed to, which establishes new commitments for the period 2013–2020. As of October 2020, 147 states have accepted this amendment.

== Parties ==
Signing is optional, indicating an intention to ratify the Protocol. Ratification means that a state is legally bound by the provisions of the treaty. For Annex I parties (e.g. a developed state or one with an 'economy in transition') this means that it has agreed to cap emissions in accordance with the Protocol.

Iceland was the 55th state to ratify, fulfilling the first condition for coming-into-force. With Russia's ratification the "55 percent of 1990 carbon dioxide emissions of the Parties included in Annex I" clause was satisfied and the treaty was brought into force, effective 16 February 2005. As of October 2020, 147 states have accepted the Doha amendment. It will enter into force as of 31 December 2020.

Party	Annex	% for ratification	emissions limit (2012)	emissions limit (2020)	Signed	Ratification / Acceptance	Amendment acceptance	Notes
Afghanistan						25 March 2013		
Albania						1 April 2005	22 October 2020	
Algeria						16 February 2005	28 September 2015	
Angola						8 May 2007	22 September 2020	
Antigua and Barbuda					16 March 1998	3 November 1998	23 September 2016	
Argentina					16 March 1998	28 September 2001	1 December 2015	
Armenia						25 April 2003	31 March 2017	
Australia	I, II	2.1%	+8% (Note: Maximum increase allowed.)	−0.5%	29 April 1998	3 December 2007	9 November 2016	
Austria	I, II	0.4%	−8% (−13%) (Note: The 15 member states of the European Union at the time of adoption of the Kyoto Protocol each agreed to a reduction target of −8% under Annex B, as did the European Communities as a whole. A declaration was made upon ratifacation that an agreement had been reached by the states to jointly meet their reduction commitments under the Protocol, as permitted by Article 4 of the Protocol. Emission quotas were pooled and allocated amongst the member states by an internal EU Council Decision. The specific EU imposed targets are listed in brackets. The 13 member states that entered the union later did not participate in this joint agreement, and retained their individual Kyoto targets (if applicable).)	−20% (−16%) (Note: The 27 member states of the European Union at the time of adoption of the Doha Amendment, in addition to Croatia, which subsequently acceded to the EU, and Iceland each agreed to a reduction a target of −20% under the amended Annex B, as did the European Union as a whole. An agreement was subsequently reached by the states to jointly meet their reduction commitments under the amended Protocol. Emission quotas were pooled and allocated amongst the member states by an internal EU Council Decision.)	24 September 1998	31 May 2002	21 December 2017	
Azerbaijan						28 September 2000	1 July 2015	
Bahamas						9 April 1999	4 November 2015	
Bahrain						31 January 2006		
Bangladesh						22 October 2001	13 November 2013	
Barbados						7 August 2000	14 August 2013	
Belarus	I	(Note: Emissions of states listed in Annex I that were not a party to the UNFCCC at the time of adoption of the Kyoto Protocol, which were thus not permitted to sign the Protocol, were not included in the totals for entry into force for the Protocol.)	none (Note: States listed in Annex I that were not a party to the UNFCCC at the time of the adoption of the Kyoto Protocol were not eligible sign the Protocol and were not listed in Annex B.) (Note: A proposal to amend Annex B to list Belarus as an economy in transition with an emissions reduction for the first commitment period of −8% was adopted by the Conference of the Parties to the UNFCCC in 2006, but did not enter into force prior to the end of the commitment period in 2012 due to not being ratified by a sufficient number of states.)	−12% (Note: Belarus was added to Annex B with the Doha Amendment.)		26 August 2005		
Belgium	I, II	0.8%	−8% (−7.5%)	−20% (−15%)	29 April 1998	31 May 2002	14 November 2017	
Belize						26 September 2003	24 July 2018	
Benin						25 February 2002	29 August 2018	
Bhutan						26 August 2002	29 September 2015	
Bolivia					9 July 1998	30 November 1999	17 September 2020	
Bosnia and Herzegovina						16 April 2007		
Botswana						8 August 2003	7 March 2016	
Brazil					29 April 1998	23 August 2002	13 February 2018	
Brunei						20 August 2009	14 November 2014	
Bulgaria	I	0.6%	−8%	−20% (+20%)	18 September 1998	15 August 2002	21 December 2017	
Burkina Faso						31 March 2005	29 November 2016	
Burundi						18 October 2001		
Cambodia						22 August 2002	17 November 2015	
Cameroon						28 August 2002		
Cape Verde						10 February 2006		
Central African Republic						18 March 2008		
Chad						18 August 2009		
Chile					17 June 1998	26 August 2002	10 November 2015	
China					29 May 1998	30 August 2002	2 June 2014	Hong Kong: applied since 8 April 2003; Macao: applied since 14 January 2008
Colombia						30 November 2001		
Comoros						10 April 2008	7 September 2014	
Democratic Republic of the Congo						23 March 2005		
Republic of the Congo						12 February 2007	14 May 2015	
Cook Islands					16 September 1998	27 August 2001	5 November 2018	
Costa Rica					27 April 1998	9 August 2002	21 September 2016	
Croatia	I (Note: At their request, an amendment to the UNFCCC which entered into force in 1998 added Croatia, Liechtenstein, Monaco and Slovenia to Annex I, while the Czech Republic and Slovakia replaced Czechoslovakia, from which they had seceded in 1993, in Annex I.)	(Note: Emissions of Annex I parties to the UNFCCC that had not yet submitted their first national communication to the UNFCCC secretariat with an emission inventory at the time of adoption of the Kyoto Protocol were not included in the figure for entry into force of the protocol.)	−5%	−20% (+11%)	11 March 1999	27 April 2007	21 December 2017	
Cuba					15 March 1999	30 April 2002	28 December 2016	
Cyprus	I (Note: At its request, an amendment to the UNFCCC which entered into force in 2013 added Cyprus to Annex I.)	(Note: Emissions not included in the figure for entry into force of the Protocol because at the time of adoption of the Kyoto Protocol the state was not listed in Annex I.)	none (Note: Not listed in Annex B because at the time of adoption of the Kyoto Protocol the state was not listed in Annex I.) (Note: As they were not listed in Annex I when the Kyoto Protocol was adopted, Cyprus and Malta were not listed in Annex B. However, following their accession to the European Union they were obliged to participate in the EU ETS. Both took on targets under the Doha Amendment.)	−20% (−5%)		16 July 1999	10 December 2015	
Czech Republic	I (Note: Monaco (1992), the Czech Republic (1995), Slovakia (1996), Slovenia (1998) and Kazakhstan (2000) submitted declarations under Article 4.2 (g) of the UNFCCC, which as per Article 1.7 of the Kyoto Protocol means that they are treated as Annex I states under the Kyoto Protocol. All of these states except Kazakhstan have since been added to Annex I of the UNFCCC by an amendment to the convention.)	1.2%	−8%	−20% (+9%)	23 November 1998	15 November 2001	21 December 2017	
Denmark	I, II	0.4%	−8% (−21%)	−20% (−20%)	29 April 1998	31 May 2002	21 December 2017	Greenland: applied Faroe Islands: not applied
Djibouti						12 March 2002	23 September 2014	
Dominica						25 January 2005	15 July 2019	
Dominican Republic						12 February 2002	21 September 2016	
Ecuador					15 January 1999	13 January 2000	20 April 2015	
Egypt					15 March 1999	12 January 2005	3 February 2020	
El Salvador					8 June 1998	13 January 2000	18 September 2019	
Equatorial Guinea						16 August 2000		
Eritrea						28 July 2005	3 May 2018	
Estonia	I	0.3%	−8%	−20% (+11%)	3 December 1998	14 October 2002	21 December 2017	
Ethiopia						14 April 2005	26 June 2015	
European Union (Note: All 28 EU member states are also members of the UNFCCC individually, in addition to their common representation through the EU.)	I, II	(Note: As per Article 25 of the Kyoto Protocol, "any instrument deposited by a regional economic integration organization shall not be counted as additional to those deposited by States members of the organization.")	−8%	−20%	29 April 1998	31 May 2002	21 December 2017	All ratifications of the 15 then-EU-members and the EU itself were deposited simultaneously. For the purpose of satisfying the entry-into-force conditions, the EU's ratification was not counted.
Fiji					17 September 1998	17 September 1998	19 September 2017	
Finland	I, II	0.4%	−8% (0%) (Note: No increase allowed but no reduction required – emissions should stay at their 1990 level.)	−20% (−16%)	29 April 1998	31 May 2002	16 November 2017	
France	I, II	2.7%	−8% (0%)	−20% (−14%)	29 April 1998	31 May 2002	30 November 2017	French Guiana, Guadeloupe, Martinique, Réunion: applied French Polynesia, New Caledonia, Wallis and Futuna, French Southern Territories, Mayotte, Saint Pierre and Miquelon: not applied
Gabon						12 December 2006	1 December 2017	
Gambia						1 June 2001	7 November 2016	
Georgia						16 June 1999	16 June 2020	
Germany	I, II	7.4%	−8% (−21%)	−20% (−14%)	29 April 1998	31 May 2002	14 November 2017	
Ghana						30 May 2003	24 September 2020	
Greece	I, II	0.6%	−8% (+25%)	−20% (−4%)	29 April 1998	31 May 2002	21 December 2017	
Grenada						6 August 2002	1 April 2015	
Guatemala					10 July 1998	5 October 1999	15 October 2019	
Guinea						7 September 2000	6 April 2016	
Guinea-Bissau						18 November 2005	22 October 2018	
Guyana						5 August 2003	23 December 2014	
Haiti						6 July 2005		
Honduras					25 February 1999	19 July 2000	11 April 2014	
Hungary	I	0.5%	−6%	−20% (+10%)		21 August 2002	1 October 2015	
Iceland	I, II	0.0%	+10%	−20%		23 May 2002	7 October 2015	
India						26 August 2002	8 August 2017	
Indonesia					13 July 1998	3 December 2004	30 September 2014	
Iran						22 August 2005		
Iraq						28 July 2009		
Ireland	I, II	0.2%	−8% (+13%)	−20% (−20%)	29 April 1998	31 May 2002	21 December 2017	
Israel					16 December 1998	15 March 2004		
Italy	I, II	3.1%	−8% (−6.5%)	−20% (−13%)	29 April 1998	31 May 2002	18 July 2016	
Ivory Coast						23 April 2007		
Jamaica						28 June 1999	1 October 2020	
Japan	I, II	8.5%	−6%	none (Note: Japan, New Zealand and Russia were listed in Annex B of the Kyoto Protocol with emission limits for the first commitment period, but were not assigned any emission reduction limits under the Doha Amendment for the second commitment period.)	28 April 1998	4 June 2002		
Jordan						17 January 2003	3 January 2020	
Kazakhstan	I (dec.) (Note: Kazakhstan proposed in 1999 that Annex I be amended to include it, but the proposal was never adopted by the Conference of the Parties to the UNFCCC as no consensus could be reached on the matter.)	-	none (Note: Kazakhstan proposed in 2009 that Annex B be amended to include it as an economy in transition with an emissions reduction commitment of 0%, and latter indicated it was willing to accept a -6% limit, but the proposal was never adopted by the Conference of the Parties to the UNFCCC.)	−5%	12 March 1999	19 June 2009		
Kenya						25 February 2005	7 April 2014	
Kiribati						7 September 2000	11 February 2016	
Kuwait						11 March 2005	8 May 2019	
Kyrgyzstan						13 May 2003		
Laos						6 February 2003	23 April 2019	
Latvia	I	0.2%	−8%	−20% (+17%)	14 December 1998	5 July 2002	21 December 2017	
Lebanon						13 November 2006		
Lesotho						6 September 2000	18 January 2019	
Liberia						5 November 2002	17 August 2015	
Libya						24 August 2006		
Liechtenstein	I	0.0%	−8%	−16%	29 June 1998	3 December 2004	23 February 2015	
Lithuania	I	-	−8%	−20% (+15%)	21 September 1998	3 January 2003	22 November 2017	
Luxembourg	I, II	0.1%	−8% (−28%)	−20% (−20%)	29 April 1998	31 May 2002	21 September 2017	
Madagascar						24 September 2003	1 October 2015	
Malawi						26 October 2001	29 June 2017	
Malaysia					12 March 1999	4 September 2002	12 April 2017	
Maldives					16 March 1998	30 December 1998	1 July 2015	
Mali					27 January 1999	28 March 2002	7 December 2015	
Malta	I (Note: At its request, an amendment to the UNFCCC which entered into force in 2010 added Malta to Annex I.)	-	none	−20% (+5%)	17 April 1998	11 November 2001	21 December 2017	
Marshall Islands					17 March 1998	11 August 2003	7 May 2015	
Mauritania						22 July 2005		
Mauritius						9 May 2001	5 September 2013	
Mexico					9 June 1998	7 September 2000	23 September 2014	
Federated States of Micronesia					17 March 1998	21 June 1999	19 February 2014	
Moldova						22 April 2003		
Monaco	I	0.0%	−8%	−22%	29 April 1998	27 February 2006	27 December 2013	
Mongolia						15 December 1999	20 February 2019	
Montenegro						4 June 2007	26 December 2018	
Morocco						25 January 2002	5 September 2014	
Mozambique						18 January 2005		
Myanmar						13 August 2003	19 September 2017	
Namibia						4 September 2003	17 February 2015	
Nauru						16 August 2001	1 December 2014	
Nepal						16 September 2005		
Netherlands	I, II	1.2%	−8% (−6%)	−20% (−16%)	29 April 1998	31 May 2002	22 November 2017	Aruba: not applied Curaçao: not applied Sint Maarten: not applied Caribbean Netherlands: not applied
New Zealand (Note: The states in free association with New Zealand, the Cook Islands and Niue have their own separate memberships in the UNFCCC.)	I, II	0.2%	0%	none	22 May 1998	19 December 2002	30 November 2015	Tokelau: not applied
Nicaragua					7 July 1998	18 November 1999	3 July 2019	
Niger					23 October 1998	30 September 2004	1 August 2018	
Nigeria						10 December 2004	2 October 2020	
Niue					8 December 1998	6 May 1999	10 December 2019	
North Korea						27 April 2005		
North Macedonia						18 November 2004	18 October 2019	
Norway	I, II	0.3%	+1%	−16%	29 April 1998	30 May 2002	12 June 2014	
Oman						19 January 2005		
Pakistan						11 January 2005	31 October 2017	
Palau						10 December 1999	10 March 2015	
Panama					8 June 1998	5 March 1999	29 September 2015	
Papua New Guinea					2 March 1999	28 March 2002		
Paraguay					25 August 1998	27 August 1999	21 February 2019	
Peru					13 November 1998	12 September 2002	24 September 2014	
Philippines					15 April 1998	20 November 2003	13 April 2016	
Poland	I	3.0%	−6%	−20% (+14%)	15 July 1998	13 December 2002	28 September 2018	
Portugal	I, II	0.3%	−8% (+27%)	−20% (+1%)	29 April 1998	31 May 2002	22 November 2017	
Qatar						11 January 2005	28 October 2020	
Romania	I	1.2%	−8%	−20% (+19%)	5 January 1999	19 March 2001	3 May 2016	
Russia	I	17.4%	0%	none	11 March 1999	18 November 2004		
Rwanda						22 July 2004	20 November 2015	
Saint Kitts and Nevis						8 April 2008	25 October 2016	
Saint Lucia					16 March 1998	20 August 2003	20 November 2018	
Saint Vincent and the Grenadines					19 March 1998	31 December 2004		
Samoa					16 March 1998	27 November 2000	18 September 2015	
San Marino						28 April 2010	4 August 2015	
Sao Tome and Principe						24 July 2008		
Saudi Arabia						31 January 2005		
Senegal						20 July 2001	27 May 2020	
Serbia						24 September 2007	30 June 2017	
Seychelles					20 March 1998	22 July 2002	15 July 2015	
Sierra Leone						10 November 2006	15 June 2020	
Singapore						12 April 2006	23 September 2014	
Slovakia	I	0.4%	−8%	−20% (+13%)	26 February 1999	31 May 2002	16 November 2017	
Slovenia	I	-	−8%	−20% (+4%)	21 October 1998	2 August 2002	21 December 2017	
Solomon Islands					29 September 1998	13 March 2003	5 September 2014	
Somalia						26 July 2010		
South Africa						31 July 2002	7 May 2015	
South Korea					25 September 1998	8 November 2002	27 May 2015	
Spain	I, II	1.9%	−8% (+15%)	−20% (−10%)	29 April 1998	31 May 2002	14 November 2017	
Sri Lanka						3 September 2002	2 December 2015	
Sudan						2 November 2004	3 February 2014	
Suriname						25 September 2006		
Swaziland						13 January 2006	21 September 2016	
Sweden	I, II	0.4%	−8% (+4%)	−20% (−17%)	29 April 1998	31 May 2002	14 November 2017	
Switzerland	I, II	0.3%	−8%	−15.8%	16 March 1998	9 July 2003	28 August 2015	
Syria						27 January 2006		
Tajikistan						5 January 2009		
Tanzania						26 August 2002		
Thailand					2 February 1999	28 August 2002	1 September 2015	
Timor-Leste						14 October 2008		
Togo						2 July 2004	5 November 2018	
Tonga						14 January 2008	5 November 2018	
Trinidad and Tobago					7 January 1999	28 January 1999	6 August 2015	
Tunisia						22 January 2003		
Turkey	I (Note: Turkey was originally listed in both Annex I and Annex II of the UNFCCC. It refused to ratify the Convention, as it objected to its listing in the annexes. In 1997 a proposal was submitted that Annex I and Annex II be amended to remove Turkey. Though no consensus could be reached on this proposal, a compromise was reached and an amendment that entered into force in 2002 removed Turkey from Annex II.)	-	none	none		28 May 2009		
Turkmenistan					28 September 1998	11 January 1999		
Tuvalu					16 November 1998	16 November 1998	4 December 2014	
Uganda						25 March 2002	8 July 2015	
Ukraine	I	-	0%	−24%	15 March 1999	12 April 2004		
United Arab Emirates						26 January 2005	26 April 2013	
United Kingdom	I, II	4.3%	−8% (−12.5%)	−20% (−16%)	29 April 1998	31 May 2002	17 November 2017	Guernsey and Isle of Man, applied since 4 April 2005; Gibraltar, since 2 January 2007; Bermuda, Cayman Islands, Falkland Islands, Jersey, since 7 March 2007. Anguilla, British Virgin Islands, Montserrat, Pitcairn Islands, Saint Helena, Ascension and Tristan da Cunha, Turks and Caicos Islands or the Sovereign Base Areas of Akrotiri and Dhekelia: not applied
Uruguay					29 July 1998	5 February 2001	12 September 2018	
Uzbekistan					20 November 1998	12 October 1999		
Vanuatu						17 July 2001	15 March 2018	
Venezuela						18 February 2005	1 March 2018	
Vietnam					3 December 1998	25 September 2002	22 June 2015	
Yemen						15 September 2004		
Zambia					5 August 1998	7 July 2006	22 August 2019	
Zimbabwe						30 June 2009	20 April 2016	
Totals	I: 38 + EU II: 21+EU	33 (63.9%)	-%: 31 (24) 0%: 3 (5) +%: 3 (8)			192 (incl. EU)	147	

== Former parties ==
Country	Annex	% for ratification	emissions limit (2012)	emissions limit (2020)	Signed	Ratification/Acceptance	Amendment acceptance	Notes
Canada	I, II	3.3%	−6%	none (Note: Canada and the United States were listed in Annex B of the Kyoto Protocol with emission limits for the first commitment period, but as they were not parties to the Kyoto Protocol at the time of adoption of the Doha Amendment they were removed from Annex B.)	29 April 1998	17 December 2002		Withdrew 15 December 2011, effective 15 December 2012. (See Canada and the Kyoto Protocol)

== Signatory ==
Country	Annex	% for ratification	emissions limit (2012)	emissions limit (2020)	Signed	Notes
United States	I, II	36.1%	−7%	none	12 November 1998	

== Not signatories or parties ==
As of 2022 there are four UN member states or observers which are not party to the protocol, all of which are members of the UNFCCC: Andorra, Holy See, Palestine, South Sudan.
