= Margin (economics) =

Set of constraints conceptualised as a border

Within economics, margin is a concept used to describe the current level of consumption or production of a goods or service. Margin also encompasses various concepts within economics, denoted as marginal concepts, which are used to explain the specific change in the quantity of goods and services produced and consumed. These concepts are central to the economic theory of marginalism. This is a theory that states that economic decisions are made in reference to incremental units at the margin, and it further suggests that the decision on whether an individual or entity will obtain additional units of a good or service depends on the marginal utility of the product.

These marginal concepts are used to theorise various market behaviours and form the basis of price theory. It is a central idea within microeconomics and is used to predict the demand and supply of goods and services within an economy.

== Marginal concepts ==
=== Marginal cost ===
Marginal cost is the change in monetary cost associated with an increase in the quantity of production of a certain good or service. It is measured in dollars per unit, and includes all the variable costs that alter depending on the level of production. Marginal cost differs from average cost as it solely provides the additional cost of one unit, rather than the average cost of each unit.

The marginal cost function is the slope of the total cost function. Thus, given a continuous and differentiable cost function, the marginal cost function is the derivative of the cost function with respect to the quantity produced.

=== Marginal utility ===
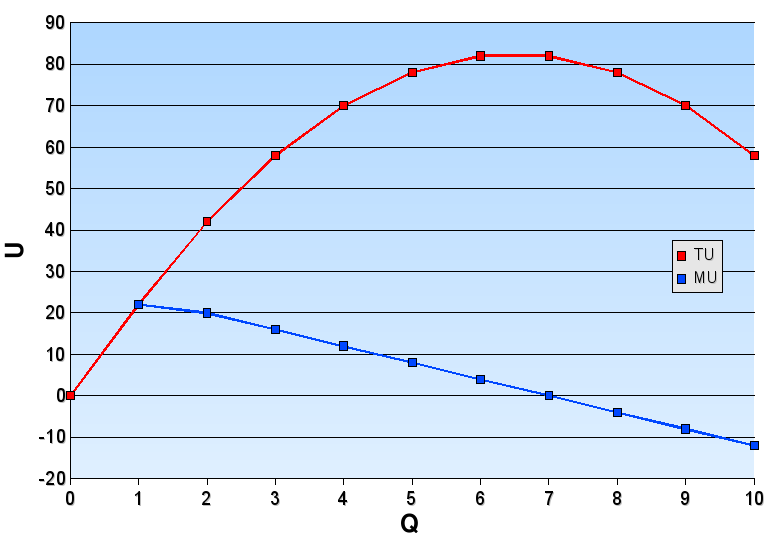
Marginal utility

Marginal utility describes the added satisfaction or benefits a consumer will obtain by purchasing an additional product or service. The marginal utility can be positive, negative or zero. A negative marginal utility states that the user gains dissatisfaction from an additional unit, whilst a marginal utility of zero states that no satisfaction is gained from the additional unit.

Within marginal utility, the law of diminishing marginal utility describes that the benefit to a consumer of an additional unit is inversely related to the number of current units, demonstrating that the added benefit of each new unit is less than the unit prior.

An example of this could be demonstrated by a family buying dinner. The 1st plate of food would have a greater marginal utility than the 30th plate of food, as the families hunger would be reduced and they would thus obtain less value from it.

=== Marginal rate of substitution ===
The marginal rate of substitution is the least favourable rate an individual or entity would exchange a good or service for another good or service. The marginal rate of substitution is associated with the value an individual or entity places on each unit, and would only trade if it provides a positive net value, whereby the value of the good or service obtained is greater than the one given away.

The marginal rate of substitution is calculated between two goods placed on the indifference curve, displaying the utility of each good. The slope of the utility curve represents the quantity of goods one would be satisfied in substituting for one another. There are however difficulties in quantifying the utility of different goods and services in comparison to one another, provide a critique of this framework.

=== Marginal product ===
In the theory of marginality, the marginal product of an input is the extra output obtained by adding one unit to a specific input. This assumes all the other factors contributing to the output remain constant. For example, the marginal product of labour would be the added production when increasing a unit of labour, such as hours worked.

Marginality states that theoretically, the wage rate would equal the marginal product of labour. If the wage rate is below the marginal product of labour, profit-maximising businesses would continue to hire more employees until the marginal product reduces to the wage rate according to the law of diminishing return. Moreover, this theory can be applied to working capital, where businesses will employ more capital when the rate of interest on the capital is less than the marginal product. The value of the final product can thus be considered as a contribution of the various inputs and values derived by each.

=== Margin squeeze ===
Margin squeeze is a pricing strategy implemented by vertically integrated companies who are the dominant provider of an input. It is used to narrow the margin between the wholesale price of the input it controls and the downstream retail price to render other retailers unprofitable. It hence squeezes the margin of a good or service. This squeezing of the margin can either be executed by increasing the price for the upstream product, decreasing the price of the downstream product or performing both simultaneously.

This strategy is viewed as an anti-competitive strategy and under anti-trust policies is prohibited in most competitive markets. The European courts considered that a margin squeeze constitutes specific and independent abuse, and the US supreme court deemed that it falls under the existing abuse of refusal to deal or predation. The European courts stated that the strategy "does not allow even an equally efficient competitor to trade profitably in the downstream market on a lasting basis", and is hence viewed as an illegal strategy.

== Applications within Price theory ==
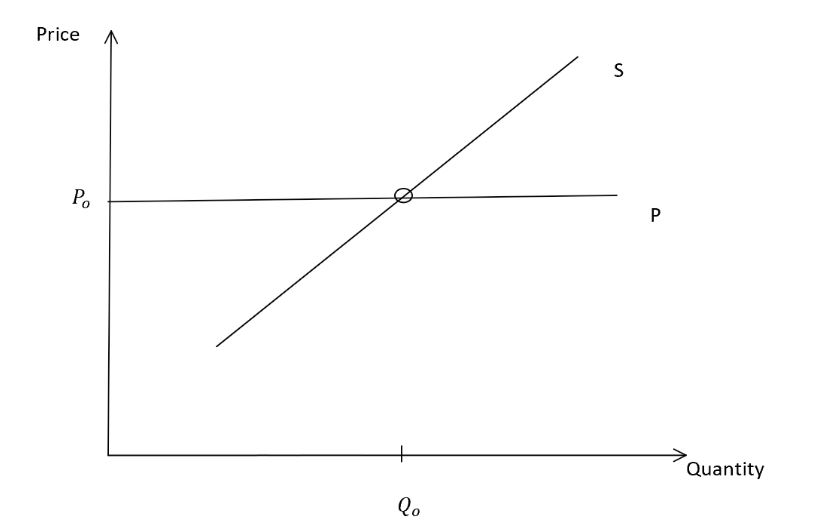
Supply graph

=== Supply ===
In both neoclassical economics and marginalism, supply curves are given by the marginal cost curve. The marginal cost curve is the marginal cost of an additional unit at each given quantity. The law of diminishing returns states the marginal cost of an additional unit of production for an organisation or business increases as the quantity produced increases. Consequently, the marginal cost curve is an increasing function for large quantities of supply.

Given a price set by a competitive market, a company will produce a product if the selling price is greater than the production cost of the unit. The company will consequently produce products until the marginal cost of an additional unit is greater than the sale price.

=== Demand ===
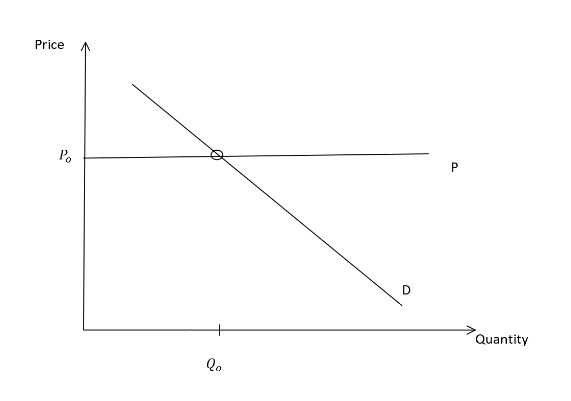
Demand graph

The demand curve within economics is founded within marginalism in terms of marginal utility. Marginal utility states that a buyer will attribute some level of benefit to an additional unit of consumption, and given the concept of diminishing marginal utility, the marginal utility of each new product will decrease as the overall quantity increases. Due to this, the demand curve will decrease as the quantity of goods increases.

Price theory states that the consumer will be willing to purchase an additional unit of a product if the marginal utility is greater than the cost of the good, as it provides a net benefit to the consumer. Given the marginal utility gradually decreases, the consumer will purchase additional units of a good or service until the marginal benefit of an additional unit is equal to the price of the unit as set by the market, shown by the intersection of the demand and cost functions.

An increase in price would consequently decrease demand for the individual as it would shift the cost curve up, and intersect the marginal utility curve at a point to the left of the original intersection, decreasing the quantity demanded. Since the demand of the market is the demand of all consumers combined, the market demand also follows this principle.

=== Market behaviour ===
==== Perfectly competitive environment ====
Competitive environment market behaviour

In defining circumstances where both suppliers and buyers are price takers, therefore allowing the demand and supply functions to not influence one another, marginalism and neoclassical economics can define models of perfect competition. However, it does not provide an accurate depiction in an imperfect environment. Within a perfectly competitive environment, marginalism is used within the principles of demand and supply to show that the intersection of the curves would be the market equilibrium.

This is the case as a company will only produce while the price is greater or equal to the marginal cost, given by the supply curve, and the consumer will only buy the good if the demand at that quantity is greater than the cost. The intersection point is consequently equilibrium as it is the price and quantity where a goods supply would equal its demand. Any natural deviation from this equilibrium would be naturally resolved within a competitive environment and return to this state.

==== Monopoly ====
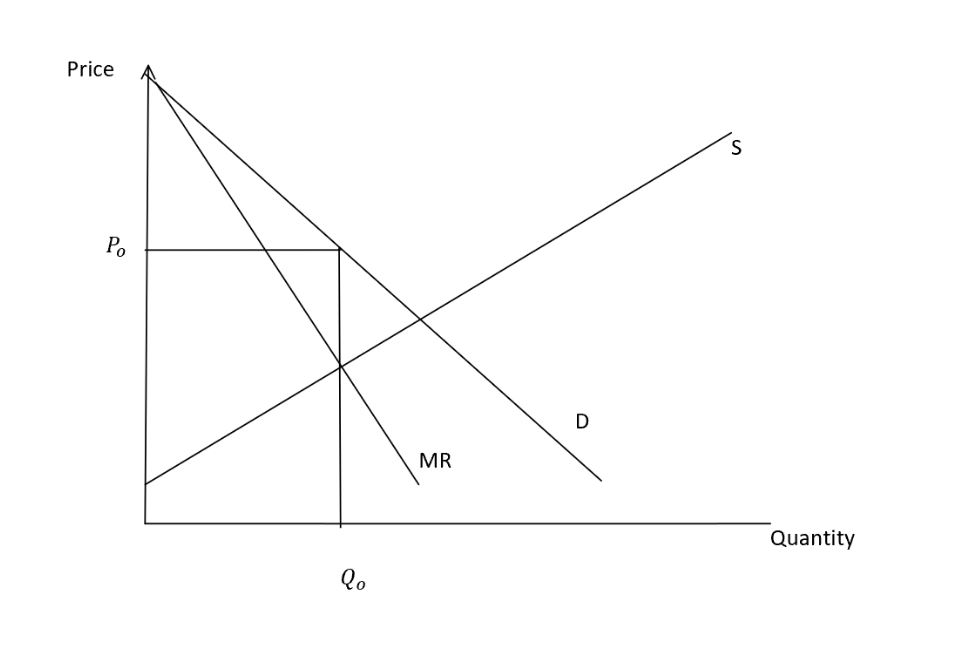
Monopoly market behaviour

In the instance of a company holding a monopoly over a particular market, the company now acts as price makers rather than price takers, and will regulate the quantity supplied and price sold to maximise profits. In an environment where they can not enact price discrimination, monopolistic companies will theoretically use the concept of marginalism to maximise profit.

Given a demand curve, a company's total revenue is equal to the product of the demand curve and quantity supplied. The marginal revenue curve can then be calculated as the derivative of the total revenue curve with respect to the quantity produced. This provides the additional revenue of each unit sold.

Given monopolistic companies act as price makers, and control the quantity supplied, they will produce at a quantity that allows them to maximise their profit.

Therefore they will produce until the marginal cost curve is greater than the marginal revenue curve, as any products sold after will incur a decrease from the maximum profit, and the price will be set by the demand function at that given quantity.

== Criticisms ==
There are several critiques of the theory of marginal utility. A major critique is that the theory ignores how an individual's valuation of a good or service may be dependent on their reference point and personal circumstances and they may not act as ‘rationale’. Psychologists have suggested that people's perceptions and judgements are influenced by their reference position. This is demonstrated by Richard Thaler’s endowment effect experiment, whereby individuals were sold small objects and then offered an option for the item to be bought back from them. He found that people would only sell the product at a premium, demonstrating that the value of the good was higher when viewed as something that could be lost compared to something that could be acquired. John List however performed a similar experiment with trading cards and found these subjects were less influenced by endowment. His research suggested that traders learnt from prior experiences and make decisions based on long term value, rather than the emotions associated with the loss of the good. Moreover, findings suggest that benefits and costs are processed in different parts of the brain and thus may not be perfectly correlated.

The uncertainty over how much marginal utility an individual will give to a certain good or service and its dependence on their individual reference point and context makes it difficult to quantify each individual's marginal utility for a certain product. However, marginal utility theory assumes this deviation to be non-existent and the consumer to be perfectly rational and uniform. Therefore, there is no certainty that people will act as theorised and they are expected to deviate, limiting this theory.

Another key limitation of margin is how marginal change is measured. Quantifying the marginal utility of certain products and services such as food may be difficult as utility is a subjective value and thus individuals may struggle to associate a numerical value to it.

The theory also assumes the marginal utility of money to be constant, however, this is not true in practice as the value of each additional dollar decreases as the overall quantity of money increases. Thus the marginal utility of money can be considered non-uniform in practice. For example, gaining $1 after having only $2 is worth more than gaining $1 after having $2,000,000.

== Alternate theories ==
=== Labour theory of value ===
The labour theory of value is an economic theory that states that the value of a good or service is quantified by the ‘socially necessary labour’ required to produce it. The theory is often associated with Marxian economics and is central to his theory that centres on how capitalism exploits the working class.

This theory values a good or service based on the duration and intensity of labour required to produce it. The theory also encompasses the means of production, referring to the tools, materials, power and other means required to produce the goods or services that are a result of prior labour. In its simplest form, the final value of a product is equal to the sum of the value of labour time( average skill and productivity) and the value of the means of production, also known as constant capital.

==== Diamond-water paradox ====
The labour theory of value was used to explain the Diamond-Water paradox as proposed by Adam Smith. It asserts that although diamonds had minimal practical value compared to water back in the 19th century, the value demanded by diamonds exceeds the value of water, a resource which was essential to life and had many applications. Smith used this to support the labour theory of value, suggesting that value associated with diamonds was reflective of the labour required to obtain them, compared to water, a more readily available resource. He argued that this supports how the cost of a good is determined by its labour cost compared to use value.

Marginalism advocates however argued that Smith misunderstood marginalism fundamentally. They claimed that the marginal usefulness can only be attributed as a specific quantity, rather than categorically. For most individuals, water is sufficiently abundant, therefore the value of an additional loss or gain of a gallon of water would be very minor, whereas the rarity of diamonds means the gain or loss of one diamond would be more significant. The first gallon of water an individual has access to would have more value than the first diamond, however, each subsequent gallon would have reduced value, to the point where the first diamond would have more value than the nth gallon. The notion is a result of diminishing marginal utility.

== See also ==
- Marginalism
- Marginal utility
- Labor theory of value
- Monopoly
