= Rescue and recovery effort after the September 11 attacks on the World Trade Center =

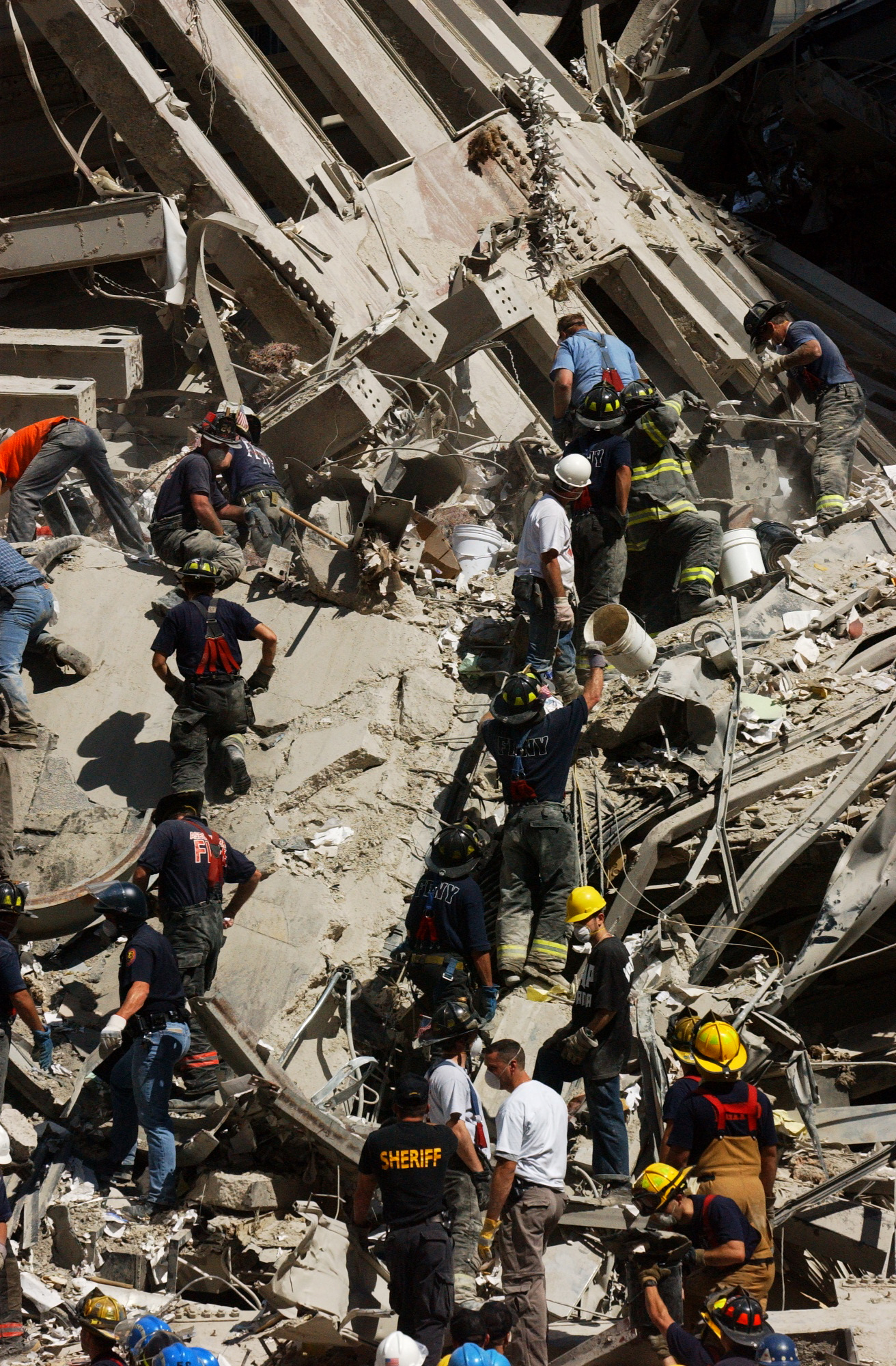
A "bucket brigade" works to clear rubble and debris after the September 11 attacks

The September 11 attacks on the World Trade Center elicited a large response of local emergency and rescue personnel to assist in the evacuation of the two towers, resulting in a large loss of the same personnel when the towers collapsed. After the attacks, the media termed the World Trade Center site "Ground Zero", while rescue personnel referred to it as "The Pile".

In the ensuing recovery and cleanup efforts, personnel related to the metalwork and construction professions would descend on the site to offer their services and remained until the site was cleared in May 2002. In the years since, investigations and studies have examined effects upon those who participated, noting a variety of afflictions attributed to the debris and stress.

== Building evacuation ==
After American Airlines Flight 11 crashed into the North Tower (1 WTC) of the World Trade Center, a standard announcement was given to tenants in the South Tower (2 WTC) to stay put and that the building was secure. However, many defied those instructions and proceeded to evacuate the South Tower (most notably, Rick Rescorla, Security Director at Morgan Stanley, evacuated 2,687 of the 2,700 Morgan Stanley employees in the building). People evacuating from WTC 2 were ordered up from the lobby level to a door on the mezzanine level that led to a covered footbridge over West Street to a building complex then called the World Financial Center. People evacuating from WTC 1 were directed from the lobby level through the WTC shopping mall beneath the outdoor plaza. The firefighters directing evacuees did not want anyone going through the front doors because of falling debris and falling people.

Standard evacuation procedures for fires in the World Trade Center called for evacuating only the floors immediately above and below the fire, as simultaneous evacuation of up to 50,000 workers would be too chaotic.

== Emergency response ==
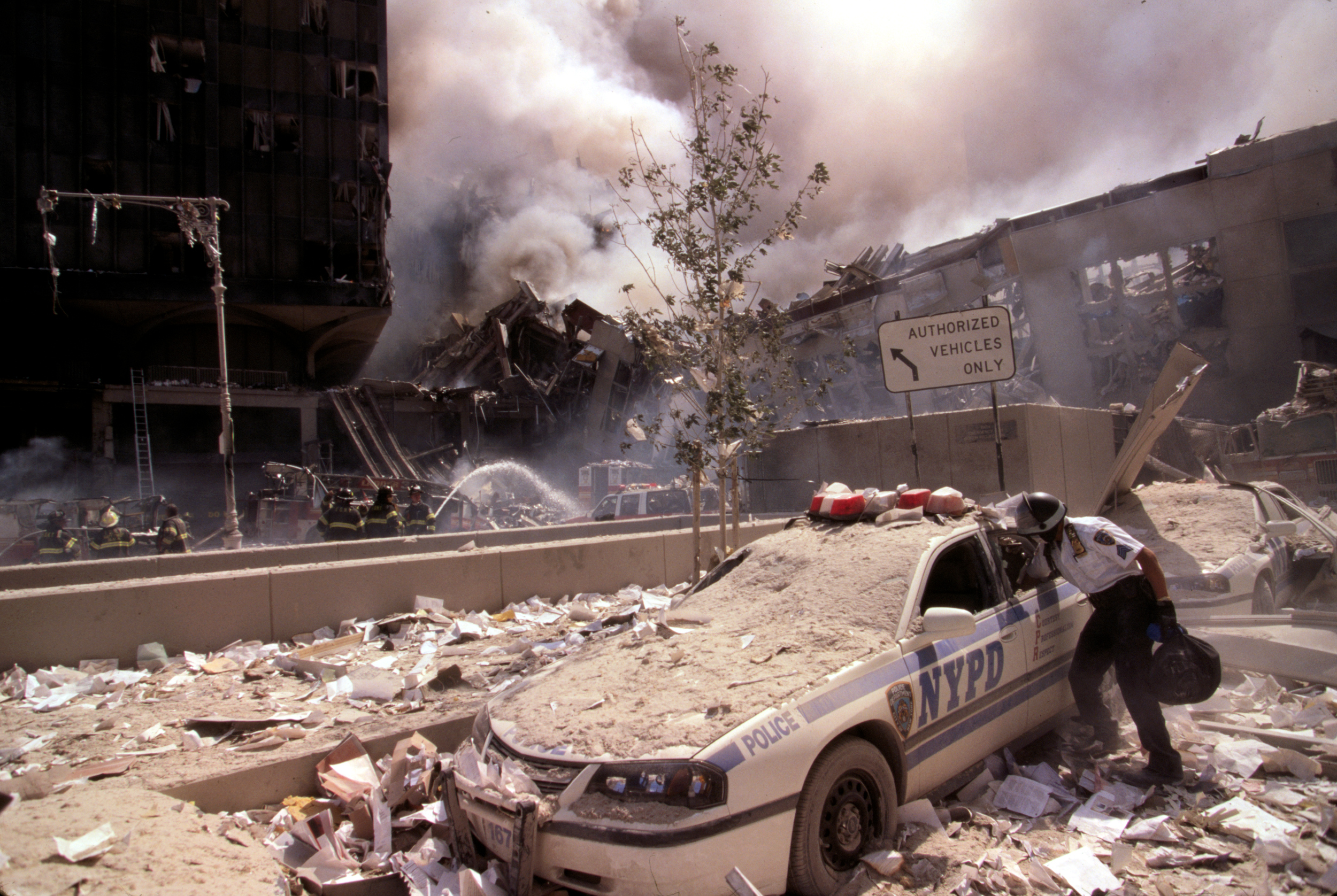
New York Police Department personnel examining a smashed New York City police car, during 9/11.

=== Firefighters ===
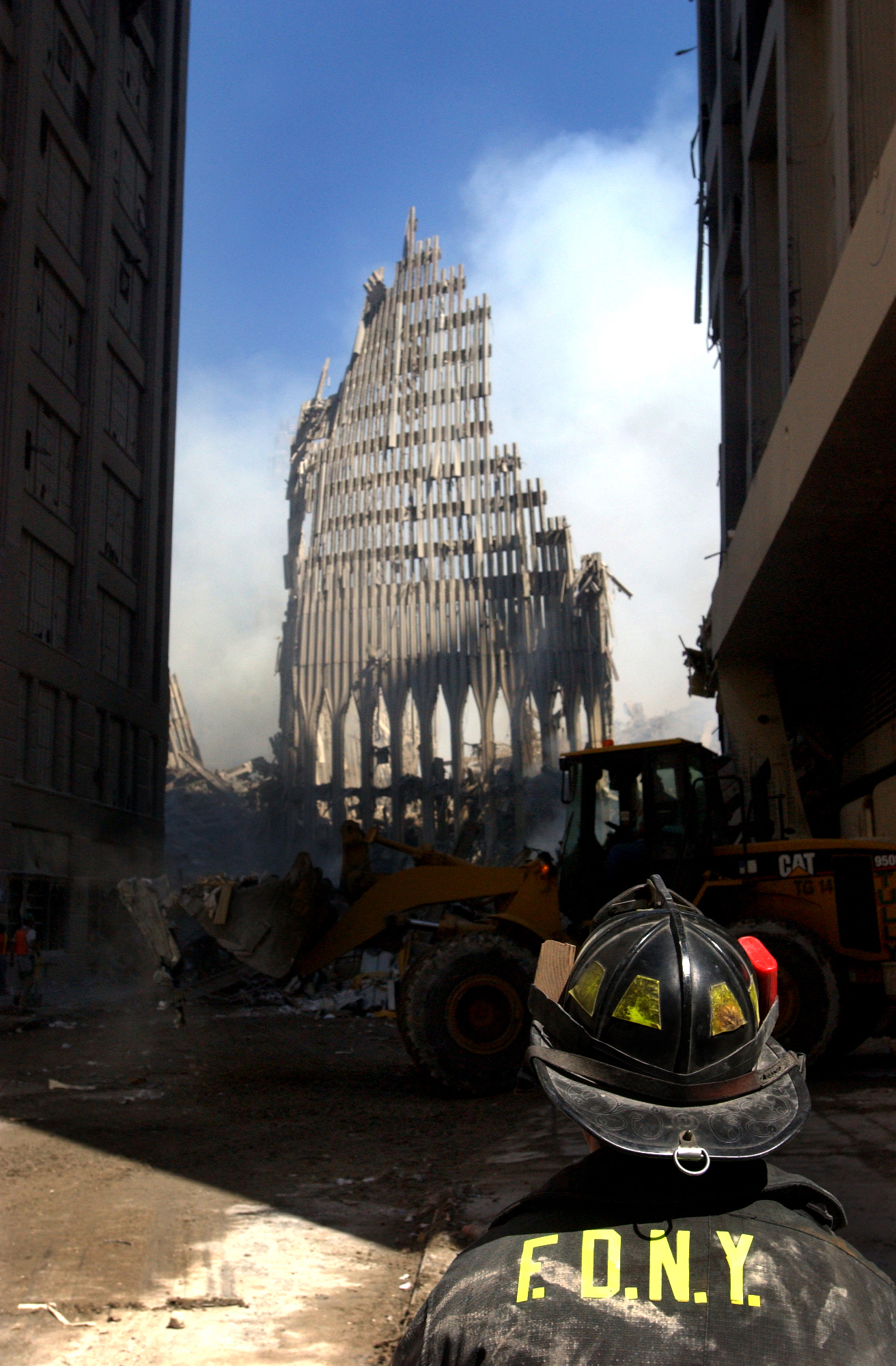
A firefighter looks up at the remains of the South Tower. (September 13, 2001)

Firefighters from the New York City Fire Department (FDNY) rushed to the World Trade Center minutes after the first plane struck the North Tower. Chief Joseph W. Pfeifer and his crew with Battalion 1 were among the first on the scene (Battalion 1 was the first Unit to notify the Manhattan Central Office.). Engine 10 and Ladder 10 were also some of the first on scene because their firehouse was directly across the street from the Towers. At 8:50 a.m., an Incident Command Post was established in the lobby of the North Tower. By 9:00 a.m., shortly before United Airlines Flight 175 hit the South Tower, the FDNY chief had arrived and taken over command of the response operations. Concerned about falling debris, he moved the incident command center to a spot located across West Street, but numerous fire chiefs remained in the lobby which continued to serve as an operations post where alarms, elevators, communications systems, and other equipment were operated. The initial response by the FDNY was on rescue and evacuation of building occupants, which involved sending firefighters up to assist people that were trapped in elevators and elsewhere. Firefighters were also required to ensure all floors were completely evacuated.

Numerous staging areas were set up near the World Trade Center, where responding fire units could report and get deployment instructions. However, many firefighters arrived at the World Trade Center without stopping at the staging areas, partly because at 8:48 a.m. Battalion 1 transmitted a Third Alarm and ordered third alarm units to the Staging Area and second alarm units to the Towers. As a result, many chiefs could not keep track of the whereabouts of their units. Numerous firefighters reported directly to the building lobbies and were ordered by those commanding the operating post to proceed into the building.

Problems with radio communication caused commanders to lose contact with many of the firefighters who went into the buildings. The repeater system in the World Trade Center, which was required for portable radio signals to transmit reliably, was malfunctioning after the impact of the planes. As a result, firefighters were unable to report to commanders on their progress, and were unable to hear evacuation orders. In addition, many off-duty firefighters arrived to help without their radios. FDNY commanders lacked communication with the New York City Police Department (NYPD), who had helicopters at the scene, or with Emergency Medical Services (EMS) dispatchers. The firefighters on the scene also did not have access to television reports or other outside information, which could help in assessing the situation. When the South Tower collapsed at 9:59 a.m., firefighters in the North Tower were not aware of exactly what happened. The battalion chief in the North Tower lobby immediately issued an order over the radio for firefighters in the tower to evacuate, but many did not hear the order on the faulty radios. Because of this, 342 firefighters died in the collapse of the towers.

The command post located across West Street was taken out when the South Tower collapsed, making command and control even more difficult and disorganized. When the North Tower collapsed, falling debris killed Peter Ganci, the FDNY chief. Following the collapse of the World Trade Center, a command post was set up at a firehouse in Greenwich Village.

The FDNY deployed more than 200 units (about half of all units) to the site, with more than 400 firefighters on the scene when the buildings collapsed. This included a total of 121 engine companies, 62 ladder companies, and other special units. The FDNY also received assistance from fire departments in Nassau, Suffolk, Westchester County, and other neighboring jurisdictions, but with limited ability to manage and coordinate efforts. Besides assisting with recovery operations at Ground Zero, volunteer firefighters from Long Island and Westchester manned numerous firehouses throughout the city to assist with other fire and emergency calls. Steve Buscemi helped as a volunteer the day after the attacks.

=== Doctors, EMS, and other medical staff ===
FDNY emergency medical technicians (EMTs) and paramedics, along with 9-1-1 system ambulances operated by voluntary hospitals and volunteer ambulance corps, began arriving at 8:53 a.m., and quickly set up a staging area outside the North Tower, at West Street, which was quickly moved over to the corner of Vesey and West Streets. As more providers responded to the scene, five triage areas were set up around the World Trade Center site. EMS chiefs experienced difficulties communicating via their radios because of the overwhelming volume of radio traffic. At 9:45, an additional dispatch channel was set aside for use by chiefs and supervisors only, but many did not know about this and continued to operate on the other channel. The communication difficulties meant that commanders lacked good situational awareness.

Dispatchers at the 9-1-1 call center, who coordinate EMS response and assign units, were overwhelmed with incoming calls, as well as communications over the radio system. Dispatchers were unable to process and make sense of all the incoming information, including information from people trapped in the towers, about conditions on the upper floors. Overwhelmed dispatchers were unable to effectively give instructions and manage the situation.

EMS personnel were in disarray after the collapse of the South Tower at 9:59 a.m. Following the collapse of the North Tower at 10:28 a.m., EMS commanders regrouped on the North End of Battery Park City, at the Embassy Suites Hotel. Around 11:00 a.m., EMS triage centers were relocated and consolidated at the Chelsea Piers and the Staten Island Ferry Terminal. Throughout the early afternoon, the soundstages at the pier were separated into two areas, one for the more seriously injured and one for the walking wounded. On the acute side, multiple makeshift tables, each with a physician, nurse, and other health care workers, and non-emergency service volunteers, were set up for the arrival of mass casualties.

Supplies, including equipment for airway and vascular control, were obtained from neighboring hospitals. Throughout the afternoon, local merchants arrived to donate food. Despite this, few patients arrived for treatment, the earliest at about 5 p.m. around the time that Building 7 collapsed, and were not seriously injured, being limited to smoke inhalation. An announcement was made around 6–7 p.m. that a second shift of providers would cover the evening shift, and that an area was being set up for the day personnel to sleep. Soon after, when it was realized that few would have survived the collapse and be brought to the piers, many decided to leave and the area was closed down.

=== Police ===
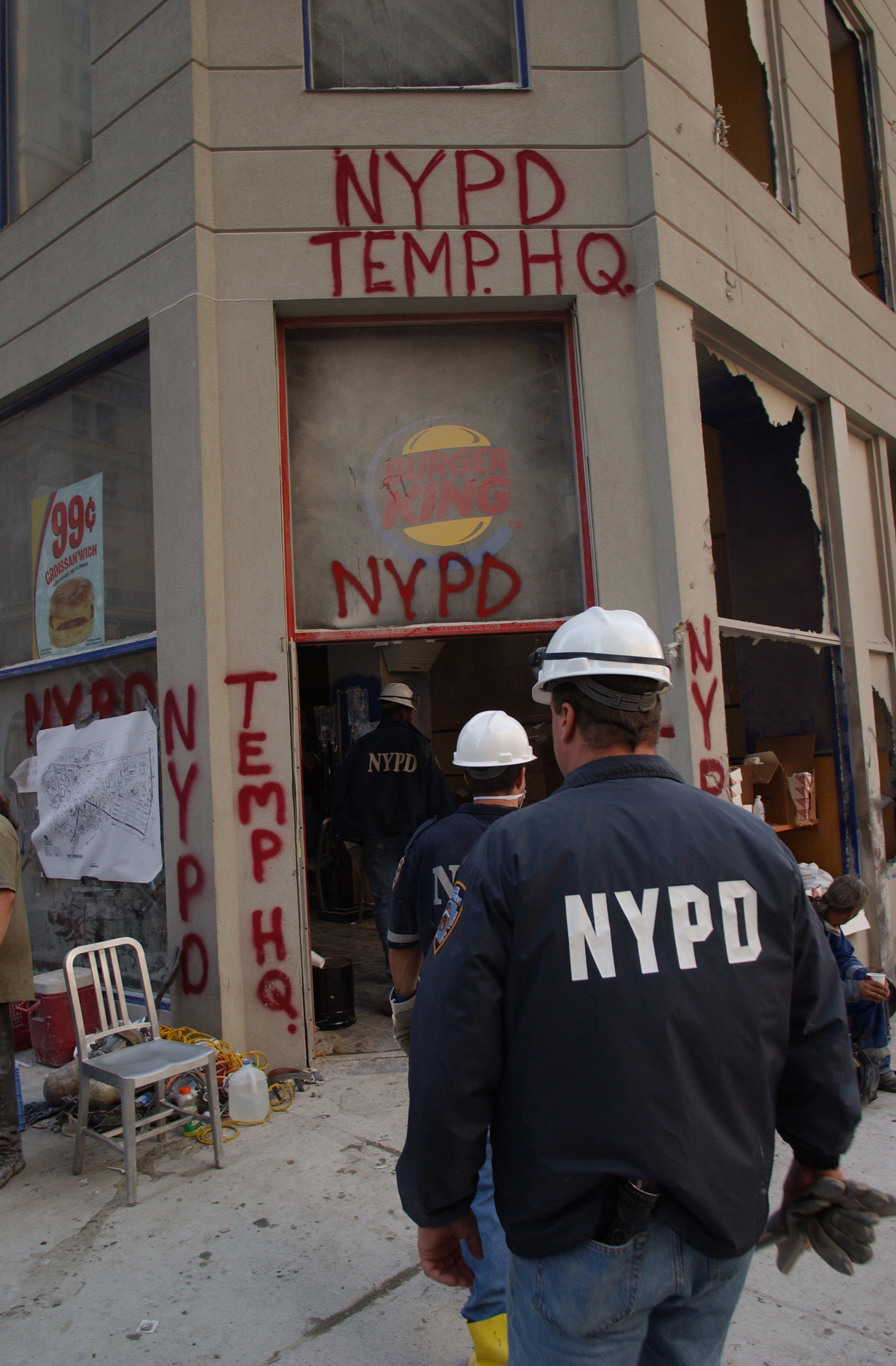
Temporary NYPD headquarters at the Burger King at 106 Liberty Street, near the World Trade Center on September 11, 2001.

The New York City Police Department (NYPD) quickly responded with the Emergency Service Units (ESU) and other responders after the crash of American Airlines Flight 11 into the North Tower. The NYPD set up its incident command center at Church Street and Vesey Street, on the opposite side of the World Trade Center from where the FDNY was commanding its operations. NYPD helicopters were soon at the scene, reporting on the status of the burning buildings. When the buildings collapsed, 23 NYPD officers were killed, along with 37 Port Authority Police Department officers. The NYPD helped facilitate the evacuation of civilians out of Lower Manhattan, including approximately 5,000 civilians evacuated by the Harbor Unit to Staten Island and to New Jersey. In ensuing days, the police department worked alternating 12-hour shifts to help in the rescue and recovery efforts.

=== Coast Guard, maritime industry, individual boat owners ===
Immediately after the first attack, the captains and crews of a large number of local boats steamed into the attack zone to assist in evacuation. These ships had responded to a request from the U.S. Coast Guard to help evacuate those stranded on Manhattan Island. Others, such as the John J. Harvey, provided supplies and water, which became urgently needed after the Towers' collapse severed downtown water mains. The Coast Guard Auxiliary helped lead a massive maritime evacuation with estimates of the number of people evacuated by water from Lower Manhattan that day in the eight-hour period following the attacks ranging from 500,000 to 1,000,000. Norman Mineta, Secretary of Transportation during the attacks, called the efforts "the largest maritime evacuation conducted in the United States". The evacuation was the largest maritime evacuation or "boatlift" in history by most estimates, passing the nine-day evacuation of Dunkirk during World War II. As many as 2,000 people injured in the attacks were evacuated by these means.

=== Amateur radio ===
Amateur radio played a role in the rescue and clean-up efforts. Amateur radio operators established communications, maintained emergency networks, and formed bucket brigades with hundreds of other volunteer personnel. Approximately 500 amateur radio operators volunteered their services during the disaster and recovery.

The New Jersey Legislature honored the role of amateur radio operators in a proclamation on December 12, 2002.

"I would like to take this opportunity to commend you for your hard work and efforts," said Assembly Speaker Albio Sires. "During times of disaster, your group has displayed superior service and dedication to the safety of our citizens. I applaud the efforts of the independent radio operators and thank you for your selfless actions on September 12, 2001. Allow me to express my sincere gratitude for your participation with the New Jersey General Assembly on this day, December 12, 2002."

Chart of firefighters, paramedics, and chaplains killed

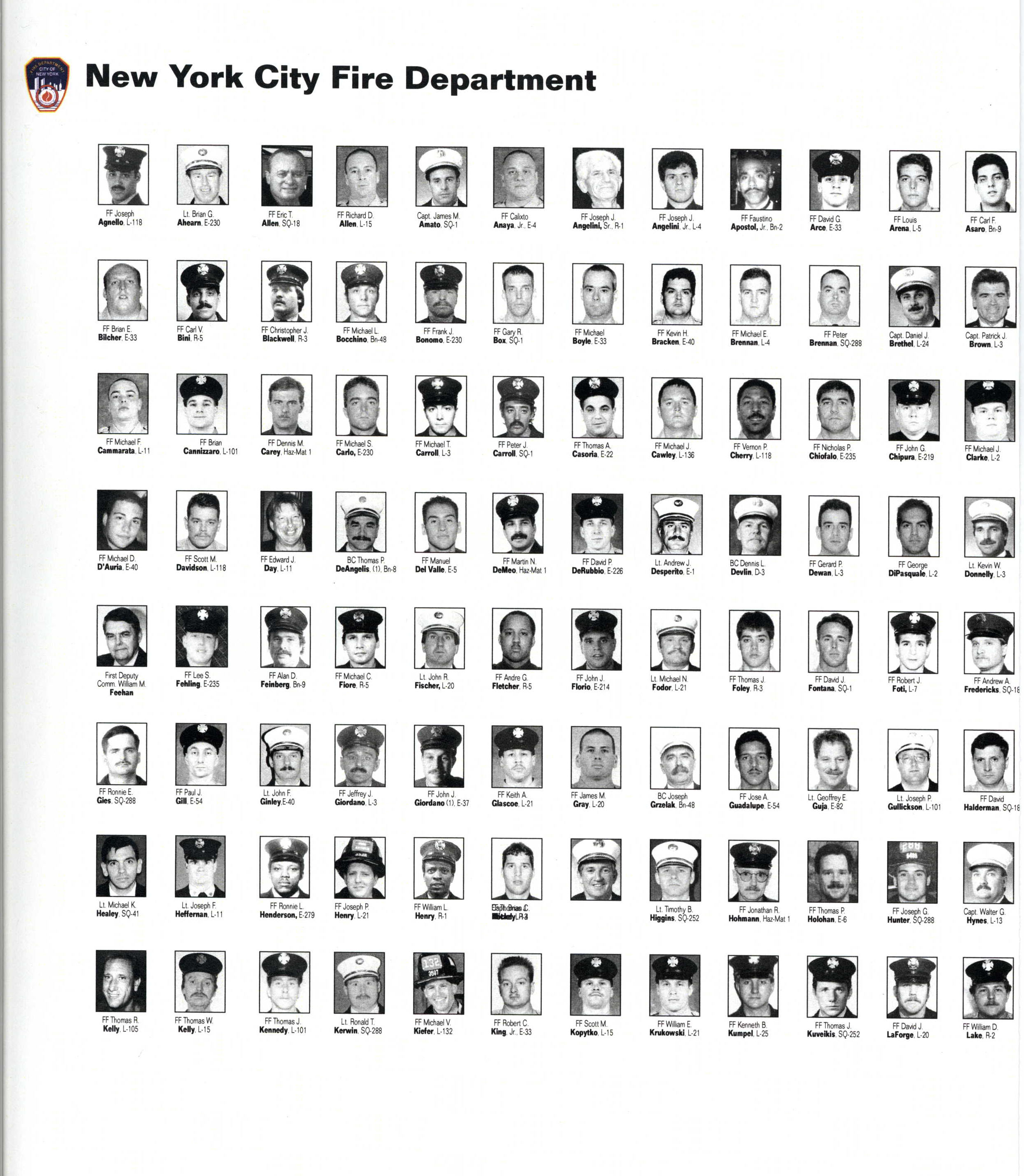

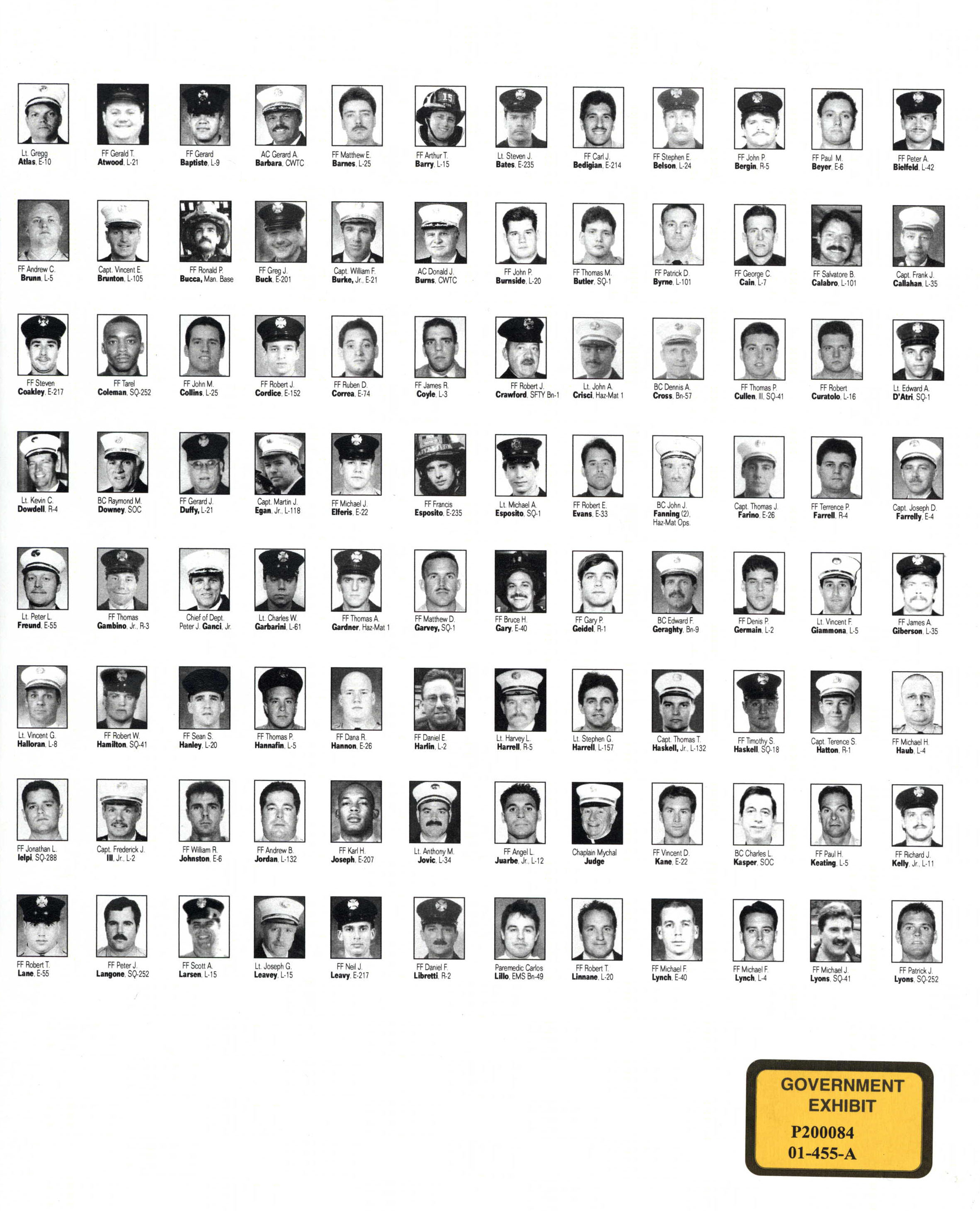

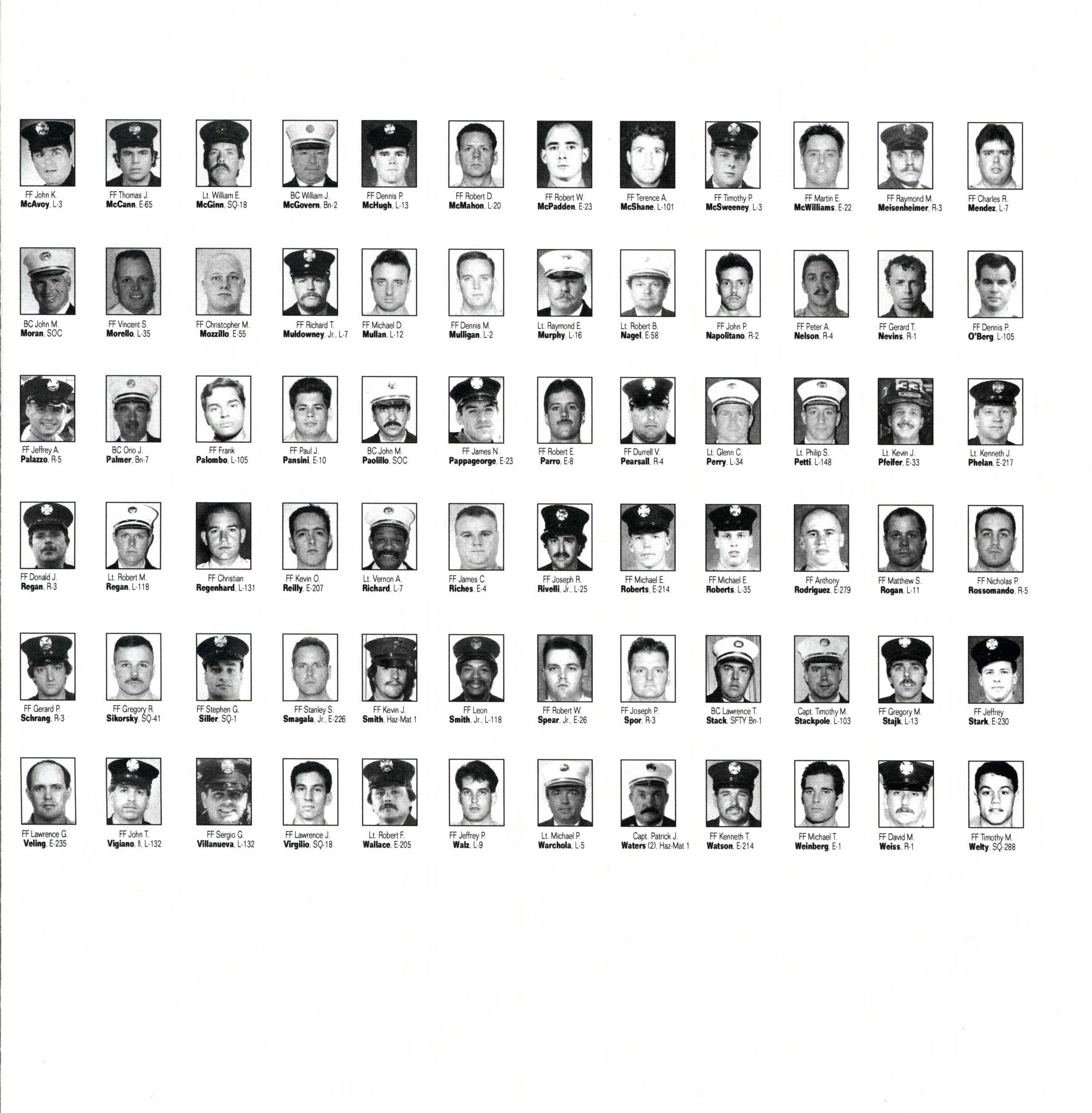

Note: Government exhibits are from the trial of Zacarias Moussaoui.

== Search and rescue efforts ==
On the day following the attacks, eleven people were rescued from the rubble, including six firefighters and three police officers. One woman was rescued from the rubble, near where a West Side Highway pedestrian bridge had been. Two PAPD officers, John McLoughlin and Will Jimeno, were also rescued. Discovered by former U.S. Marines Jason Thomas and Dave Karnes, McLoughlin and Jimeno were pulled out alive after spending nearly 24 hours beneath 30 feet (9 m) of rubble. Their rescue was later portrayed in the 2006 film World Trade Center. In total, twenty survivors were pulled out of the rubble. The final survivor, Port Authority secretary Genelle Guzman-McMillan, was rescued 27 hours after the collapse of the North Tower.

Some firefighters and civilians who survived made cell phone calls from voids beneath the rubble, though the amount of debris made it difficult for rescue workers to get to them.

By Wednesday night, 82 deaths had been confirmed by officials in New York City.

Rescue efforts were paused numerous times in the days after the attack because nearby buildings, including One Liberty Plaza, were in danger of collapsing. The last fires at the World Trade Center site were extinguished on December 20, exactly 100 days after the attacks.

== Recovery efforts ==
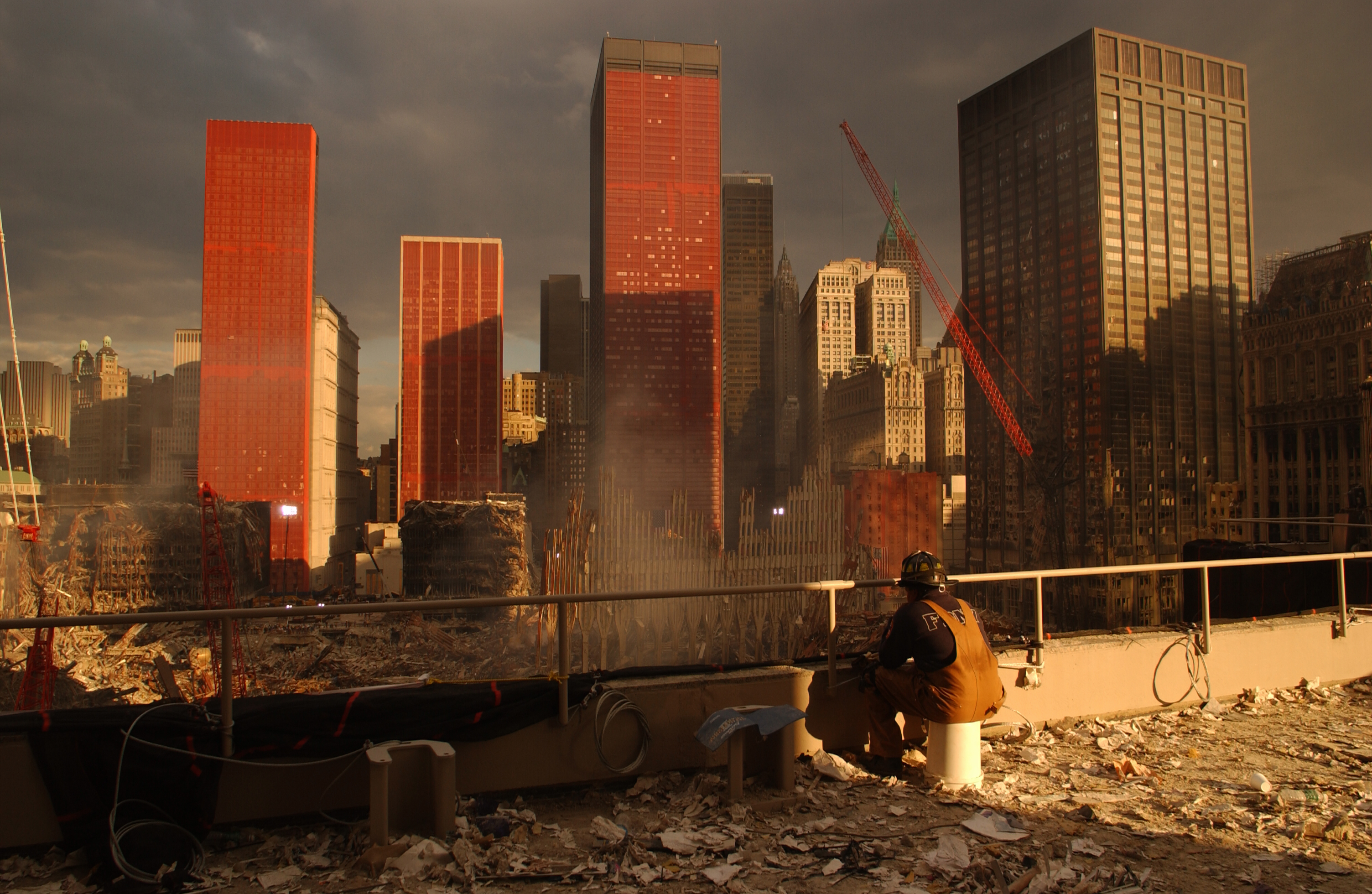
A firefighter watches debris removal at the World Trade Center on September 28.

The search and rescue effort in the immediate aftermath at the World Trade Center site involved ironworkers, structural engineers, heavy machinery operators, asbestos workers, boilermakers, carpenters, cement masons, construction managers, electricians, insulators, machinists, plumbers and pipefitters, riggers, sheet metal workers, steelworkers, truckers and teamsters, American Red Cross volunteers, and many others. Lower Manhattan, south of 14th Street, was off-limits, except for rescue and recovery workers. There were also about 400 working dogs, the largest deployment of dogs in the nation's history.

Thunder, a Washington Task Force 1 search dog, searching the World Trade Center rubble on September 21, 2001.

=== Organization ===
New York City Office of Emergency Management (OEM) was the agency responsible for coordination of the city's response to the attacks. Headed by then-Director Richard Sheirer, the agency was forced to vacate its headquarters, located in 7 World Trade Center, within hours of the attack. The building later collapsed. OEM reestablished operations temporarily at the police academy, where Mayor Giuliani gave many press conferences throughout the afternoon and evening of September 11. By Friday, rescue and reliefs were organized and administered from Pier 92 on the Hudson River.

Volunteers quickly descended on Ground Zero to help in the rescue and recovery efforts. At Jacob Javits Convention Center, thousands showed up to offer help, where they registered with authorities. Construction projects around the city came to a halt, as workers walked off the jobs to help at Ground Zero. Ironworkers, welders, steel burners, and others with such skills were in high demand. By the end of the first week, over one thousand ironworkers from across North America had arrived to help, along with countless others.

The New York City Department of Design & Construction oversaw the recovery efforts. Beginning on September 12, the Structural Engineers Association of New York (SEAoNY) became involved in the recovery efforts, bringing in experts to review the stability of the rubble, evaluate safety of hundreds of buildings near the site, and designing support for the cranes brought in to clear the debris. The City of New York hired the engineering firm, LZA-Thornton Tomasetti, to oversee the structural engineering operations at the site.

To make the effort more manageable, the World Trade Center site was divided into four quadrants or zones. Each zone was assigned a lead contractor, and a team of three structural engineers, subcontractors, and rescue workers.

- AMEC – North Tower along West Street
- Bovis Lend Lease – South Tower along Liberty Street
- Tully Construction Company, Inc. – Eastern portion of the WTC site
- Turner/Plaza Construction Joint Venture – Northern portion and 7 World Trade Center

The Federal Emergency Management Agency (FEMA), the United States Army Corps of Engineers, the Occupational Safety and Health Administration (OSHA), and the New York City Office of Emergency Management (OEM) provided support. Forestry incident management teams (IMTs) also provided support beginning in the days after the attacks to help manage operations.

A nearby Burger King restaurant was used as a center for police operations. Given that workers worked at the site, or The Pile, for shifts as long as twelve hours, a specific culture developed at the site, leading to workers developing their own jargon.

=== Debris removal ===
"The Pile" was the term coined by the rescue workers to describe the 1.8 million tons of wreckage left from the collapse of the World Trade Center. They avoided the use of "ground zero", which describes the epicenter of a bomb explosion.

Numerous volunteers organized to form "bucket brigades", which passed 5-gallon buckets full of debris down a line to investigators, who sifted through the debris in search of evidence and human remains. Ironworkers helped cut up steel beams into more manageable sizes for removal. Much of the debris was hauled off to the Fresh Kills Landfill on Staten Island where it was further searched and sorted.

According to The New York Times, by September 24, 2001, more than 100,000 tons of debris had been removed from the site. Some structural engineers have criticized the decision to recycle the steel from the buildings before it could be analyzed as part of the post-collapse investigation.

==== Reuse of steel ====
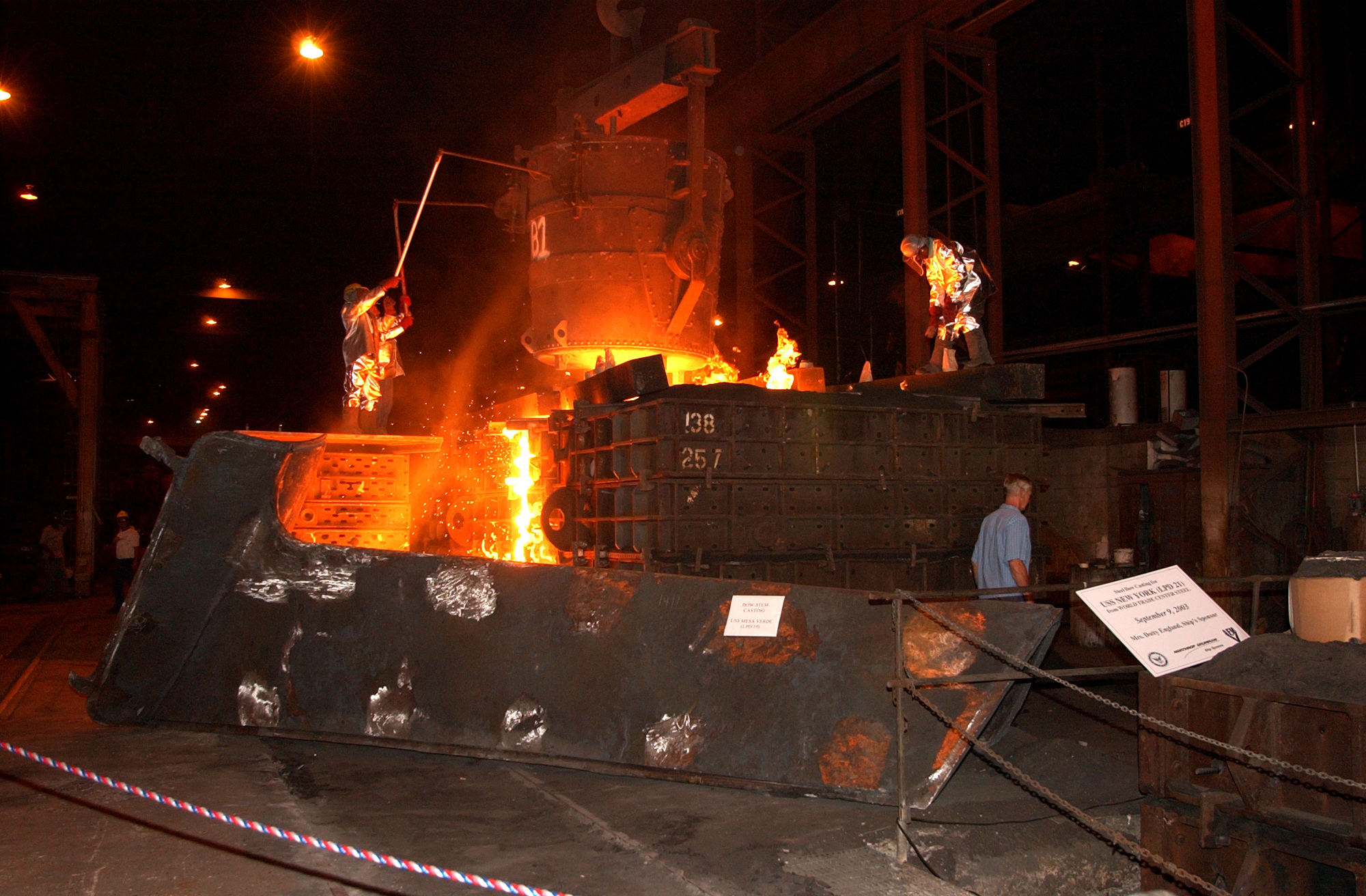
Steel from the World Trade Center is poured for construction of USS New York.

Some of the steel was reused for memorials. New York City firefighters donated a cross made of steel from the World Trade Center to the Shanksville Volunteer Fire Company in Shanksville, Pennsylvania. The beam, mounted atop a platform shaped like the Pentagon, was erected outside the Shanksville's firehouse near the crash site of United Airlines Flight 93.

Twenty-four tons of the steel used in construction of USS New York (LPD-21) came from the small amount of rubble from the World Trade Center preserved for posterity.

==== Vaulted bullion ====
In the days following the destruction of the towers, rescuers found scorch marks, likely made by a cutting torch on a basement doorway underneath 4 WTC; this was thought to be the result of looters. Further exploration of the building's basement revealed that the vault contained large amounts of gold and silver in the form of coins, as well as gold and silver bars. An armored truck operated by COMEX was also located below the World Trade Center among the other vehicles, which was fully loaded with gold and silver bars. In order to retrieve the bullion from the vault, electricity had to be supplied to its doors, which had withstood the force of the destruction above them.

Over the subsequent months, much of the bullion was recovered. Approximately 560,000 dollars' worth of coins and bars were stored in the vault by the Bank of Nova Scotia prior to September 11, 2001, with the bank having stored a total of 379,036 troy ounces of gold and 29,942,619 troy ounces of silver inside the vault. Many of these coins were purchased by Lee S. Minshull of Palos Verdes, California, who then sent them to PCGS for grading in 2002. These coins were then sold to collectors. Coins salvaged from 4 WTC's vault included American Silver Eagles, Canadian Gold Maple Leafs, South African Krugerrands and British Gold Britannias.

==== Hazards ====
Hazards at the World Trade Center site included a diesel fuel tank buried seven stories below. Approximately 2,000 automobiles that had been in the parking garage also presented a risk, with each containing, on average, at least 5 US gallons (19 L) of gasoline. Once recovery workers reached down to the parking garage level, they found some cars that had exploded and burned. The United States Customs Service, which was housed in 6 World Trade Center, had 1.2 million rounds of ammunition and weapons in storage in a third-floor vault, to support their firing range.

=== Morale ===
President George W. Bush speaking at Ground Zero with Bob Beckwith beside him

In the hours immediately after the attacks on the World Trade Center, three firefighters raised an American flag over the rubble. The flag was taken from a yacht, and the moment, which was captured on a well-known photograph, evoked comparisons to the iconic Iwo Jima photograph from 1945. Morale of rescue workers was boosted on September 14, 2001, when President George W. Bush paid a visit to Ground Zero. Standing with retired firefighter Bob Beckwith, Bush addressed the firefighters and rescue workers with a bullhorn and thanked them. Bush later remarked, "I'm shocked at the size of the devastation, It's hard to describe what it's like to see the gnarled steel and broken glass and twisted buildings silhouetted against the smoke. I said that this was the first act of war on America in the 21st century, and I was right, particularly having seen the scene." After some workers shouted that they could not hear the President, Bush famously responded by saying "I can hear you! The rest of the world hears you. And the people who knocked these buildings down will hear all of us soon!"

At some point, rescue workers realized that they were not going to find any more survivors. After a couple of weeks, the conditions at Ground Zero remained harsh, with lingering odors of decaying human remains and smoke. Morale among workers was boosted by letters they received from children around the United States and the world, as well as support from thousands of neighbors in TriBeCa and other Lower Manhattan neighborhoods.

This support continued to spread and eventually led to the founding of over 250 non-profit organizations of which raised almost $700 million within their first two years of operation. One of the nonprofits included One Day's Pay, later changed to MyGoodDeed, which championed the effort to designate September 11 as an official National Day of Service (9/11 Day).

By 2012, many of the more than 250 organizations had disbanded for lack of funding. Of the ones that remain, a handful remained functioning for those who remain in need. One of these organizations, Tuesday's Children, was founded the day after September 11 in hopes of supporting the children immediately affected by the attacks. The founder of this non-profit, David Weild IV, now calls them one of the "last men standing" in that they are now one of the few remaining organizations who "provide direct services for what social-service groups and survivors of the attacks call the '9-11 Community.'"

Other notable non-profits who are "still standing" include:

1. VOICES of September 11 who are "built on the mission of providing a 'voice' for those who died in the attacks" and "provide case management services, focus groups, depression and anxiety screenings, among other help for victims' families"
2. New York Says Thank You which is based on the idea of reaching out and giving back to "the communities who helped the city when it needed it the most"
3. Windows of Hope Family Relief Fund who "provides financial aid, health insurance, and educational help to the families of hospitality-industry workers killed in the attack"

== Military support ==
=== Civil Air Patrol ===
Immediately following the attacks, members of the Civil Air Patrol (CAP) were called up to help respond. Northeast Region placed its personnel and assets on alert moments after learning of the attack. With the exception of CAP, civilian flights were grounded by the Federal Aviation Administration. CAP flew aerial reconnaissance missions over Ground Zero in order to provide detailed analysis of the wreckage and aid in recovery efforts, including transportation of blood donations.

=== National Guard ===
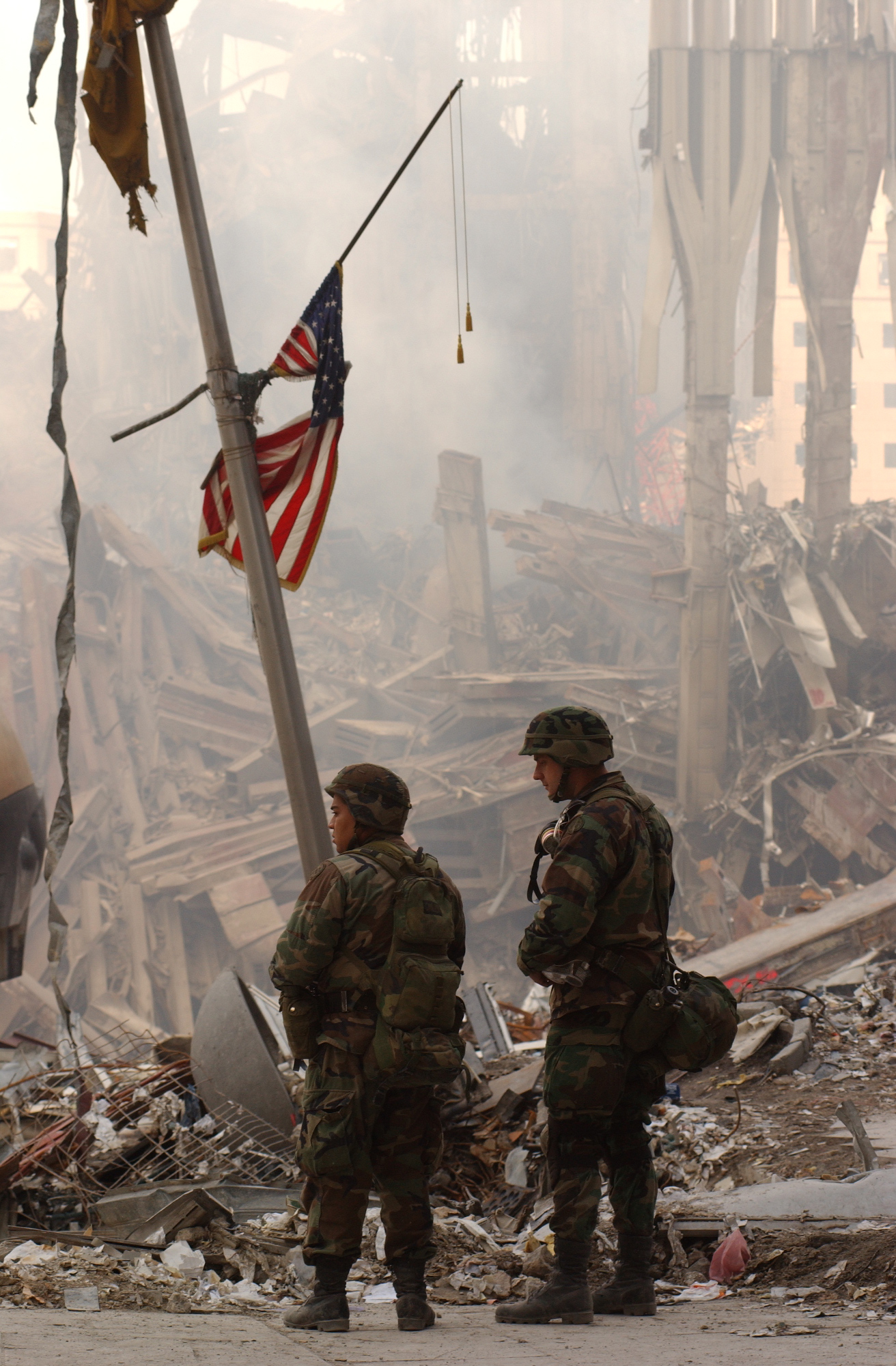
Two members of the New York Army National Guard standing at the World Trade Center site

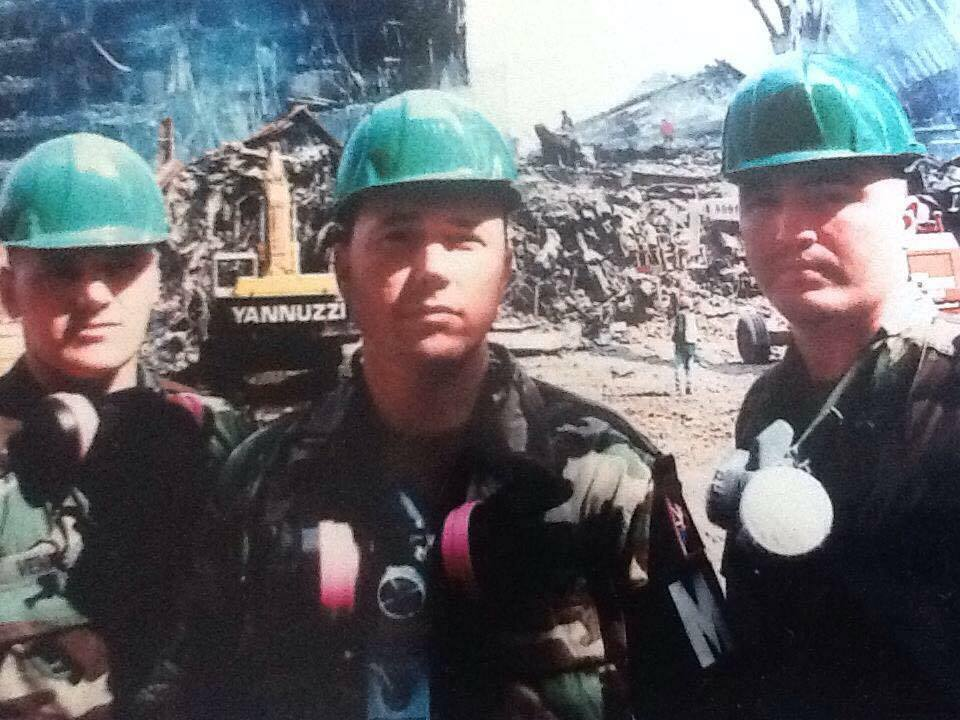
Military Police officers at Ground Zero

Elements of the New York Army National Guard's 1-101st Cavalry (Staten Island), 258th Field Artillery, 442nd Military Police Company, and 69th Infantry Regiment based in Manhattan were the first military force to secure Ground Zero on September 11. The 69th Infantry's armory on Lexington Avenue became the Family Information Center to assist persons in locating missing family members.

The National Guard supplemented the NYPD and FDNY, with 2,250 guard members on the scene by the next morning. Eventually thousands of New York Army and Air National Guardsmen participated in the rescue/recovery efforts. They conducted site security at the WTC, and at other locations. They provided the NYPD with support for traffic control, and they participated directly in recovery operations providing manpower in the form of "bucket brigades" sorting through the debris by hand.

Additionally service members provided security at a variety of location throughout the city and New York State to deter further attacks and reassure the public.

Members of the Air National Guard's 109th Airlift Wing out of Scotia, and Syracuse's 174th Fighter Wing immediately responded to New York City, setting up camp at places such as Fort Hamilton. Mostly civil engineers, firefighters and military police, they greatly aided in the clean-up effort. F-16s from the 174th Fighter Wing also ramped up their flying sorties and patrolled the skies.

The New Jersey National Guard assisted the New York National Guard's efforts following the attacks.

=== U.S. Marine Corps ===
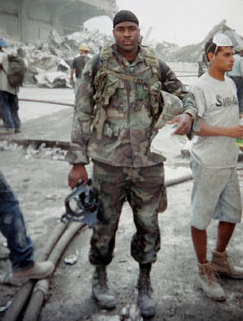
Marine Sgt. Jason Thomas standing at the site of the ruined World Trade Center, several days after the attacks

U.S. Marines were also present to assist in the rescue efforts. Films such as 2006 docudrama World Trade Center and the 2021 documentary 9/11: One Day in America talked of two Marines who rescued two trapped police officers in the rubble. U.S. Marines were headquartered at the 340 Westside Hwy Bloomberg News Building. The commanding officer was Navy Commander Hardy, and executive officer was Maj. Priester. These two oversaw 110 military personnel of various branches, various police departments and EMTs.

=== U.S. Navy ===
The U.S. Navy deployed a hospital ship USNS Comfort (T-AH-20) to Pier 92 in Manhattan. Crew members provided food and shelter for more than 10,000 relief workers. Comfort's 24-hour galley also provided 30,000 meals. Its medical resources were also used to provide first-aid and sick call services to nearly 600 people. The ship's psychological response team also saw more than 500 patients.

== Handling of cleanup procedure ==
A May 14, 2007, New York Times article, "Ground Zero Illness Clouding Giuliani's Legacy", gave the interpretation that thousands of workers at Ground Zero have become sick and that "regard Mr. Giuliani's triumph of leadership as having come with a human cost". The article reported that the mayor seized control of the cleanup of Ground Zero, taking control away from established federal agencies, such as the Federal Emergency Management Agency, the U.S. Army Corps of Engineers and the Occupational Safety and Health Administration. He instead handed over responsibility to the "largely unknown" city Department of Design and Construction. Documents indicate that the Giuliani administration never enforced federal requirements requiring the wearing of respirators. Concurrently, the administration threatened companies with dismissal if cleanup work slowed.

Workers at the Ground Zero pit worked without proper respirators. They wore painters' masks or no facial covering. Specialists claim that the only effective protection against toxins, such as airborne asbestos, is a special respirator. New York Committee for Occupational Safety and Health industrial hygienist David Newman said, "I was down there watching people working without respirators." He continued, "Others took off their respirators to eat. It was a surreal, ridiculous, unacceptable situation."

The local EPA office sidelined the regional EPA office. Dr. Cate Jenkins, a whistle-blower EPA scientist, said that on September 12, 2001, a regional EPA office offered to dispatch 30 to 40 electron microscopes to the WTC pit to test bulk dust samples for the presence of asbestos fibers. Instead, the local office chose the less effective polarized light microscopy testing method. Dr. Jenkins alleged that the local office refused, and said, "We don't want you fucking cowboys here. The best thing they could do is reassign you to Alaska."

=== Health effects ===
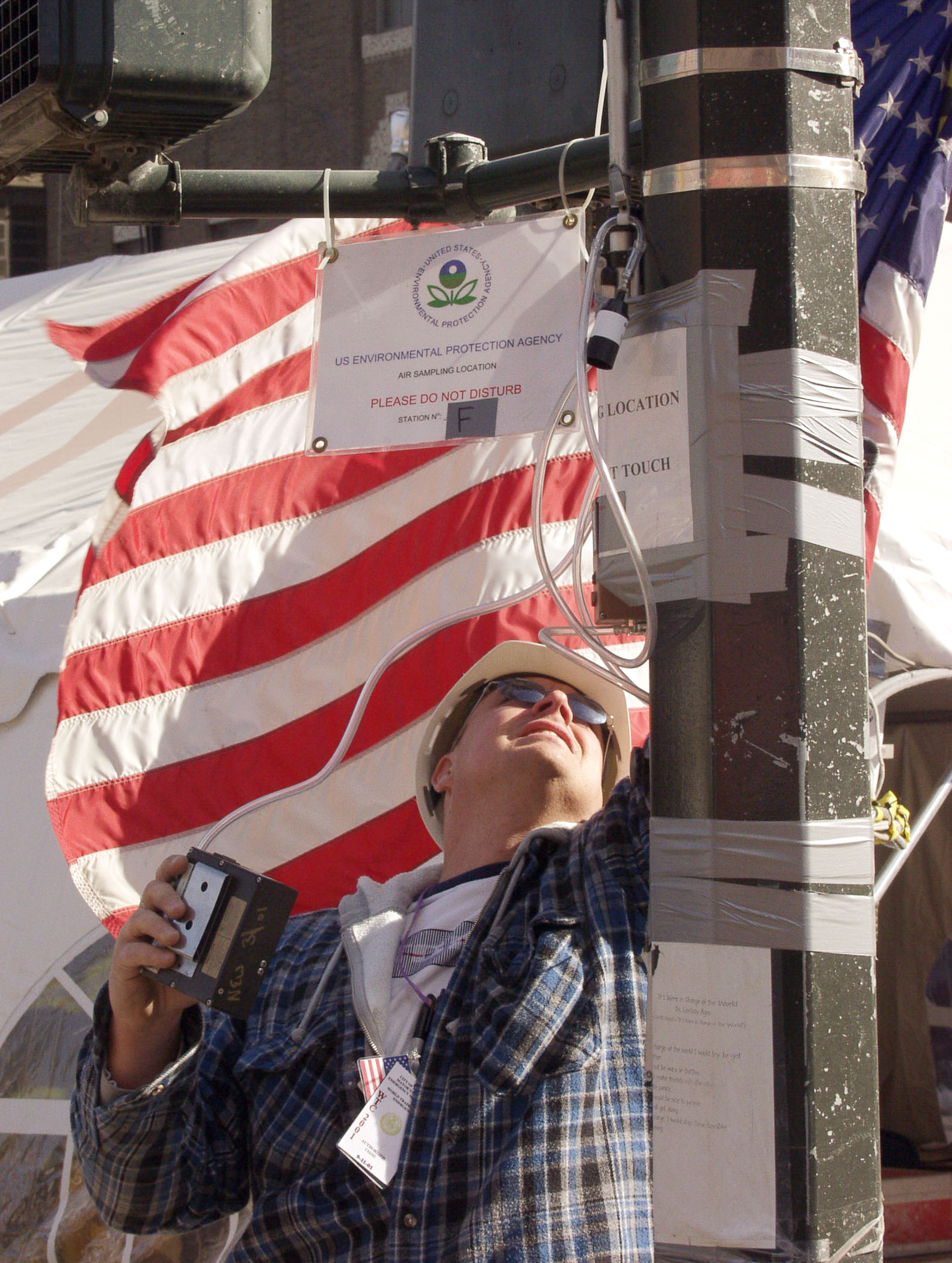
An EPA employee checks one of the many air sampling locations set up around the World Trade Center site.

There were many health problems caused by the toxins. 99% of exposed firefighters reported at least one new respiratory problem while working at the World Trade Center site that they had not experienced before. Chronic airway disease is the main lung injury among firefighters who were exposed to toxins during 9/11. Six years after the attacks, among those who never smoked, approximately 13% of firefighters and 22% of EMS had lungs that did not function as well as others around the same age. Steep declines in pulmonary lung function has been a problem since first detected among firefighters and EMS within a year of 9/11 have persisted. Increasing numbers of Ground Zero workers are getting illnesses, such as cancer. Between September 11, 2001, through 2008, there were 263 new cases of cancer found in 8,927 male firefighters who responded to 9/11 attacks. This number is 25 times more than what is expected from men from a similar age group and race. There is a 19% increase in cancer overall, between firefighters who responded to the attacks and those who were not exposed to toxins from responding to the attacks on September 11.

On January 30, 2007, Ground Zero workers and groups such as Sierra Club and Unsung Heroes Helping Heroes met at the Ground Zero site and urged President George Bush to spend more money on aid for sick Ground Zero workers. They said that the $25 million that Bush promised for the ill workers was inadequate. A Long Island iron-worker, John Sferazo, at the protest rally said, "Why has it taken you five and a half years to meet with us, Mr. President?"

Firefighters, police and their unions, have criticized Mayor Rudy Giuliani over the issue of protective equipment and illnesses after the attacks. A study by the National Institute of Environmental Safety and Health said that cleanup workers lacked adequate protective gear. The Executive Director of the National Fraternal Order of Police reportedly said of Giuliani: "Everybody likes a Churchillian kind of leader who jumps up when the ashes are still falling and takes over. But two or three good days don't expunge an eight-year record." Sally Regenhard, said, "There's a large and growing number of both FDNY families, FDNY members, former and current, and civilian families who want to expose the true failures of the Giuliani administration when it comes to 9/11." She told the New York Daily News that she intends to "Swift Boat" Giuliani.

Various health programs arose after the attacks to provide treatment for 9/11-related illnesses among responders, recovery workers, and other survivors. When the James Zadroga 9/11 Health and Compensation Act became federal law in January 2011, these programs were replaced by the World Trade Center Health Program.

== Investigations ==
Soon after the attacks, New York City commissioned McKinsey & Company to investigate the response of both the New York City Fire Department and New York City Police Department and make recommendations on how to respond more effectively to such large-scale emergencies in the future.

Officials with the International Association of Fire Fighters have also criticized Rudy Giuliani for failing to support modernized radios that might have spared the lives of more firefighters. Some firefighters never heard the evacuation orders and died in the collapse of the towers.

== Estimated costs ==
Estimated total costs, as of October 3, 2001

$5 billion for debris removal
$14 billion for reconstruction
$3 billion in overtime payments to uniformed workers
$1 billion for replacement of destroyed vehicles and equipment
(one Fire Department accident response vehicle cost $400,000)

== Reconstruction ==
Plans for the World Trade Center rebuilding started in July 2002, which was headed by the Lower Manhattan Development Corporation. There were rounds of proposals on how to rebuild the World Trade Center; however, many of the early schemes were criticized for lacking creativity. There was division among members of the public, architects, and political leadership as to what an appropriate new World Trade Center would look like. Several architects were chosen and replaced throughout the planning and design process; there were issues with implementing the early designs. By 2006 all architects for the site had been chosen and designs were largely finalized in 2007. The date of completion for the World Trade Center was scheduled for 2016. As of June 11, 2018, four of seven planned buildings were completed, as were the transportation hub, 9/11 Memorial, and Liberty Park.

== See also ==
- 2001 anthrax attacks
- Bunker gear
- Communication during the September 11 attacks
- Health effects arising from the September 11 attacks
- World Trade Center Health Program
- World Trade Center (2001–present)
