= Dominick Pezzulo =

Italian-American police officer (1965-2001)

Dominick A. Pezzulo
- Born: August 15, 1965; Giano Vetusto, Italy
- Died: September 11, 2001 (aged 36); World Trade Center, New York City, U.S.
- Cause of death: Injuries sustained from the collapse of the North Tower during the September 11 attacks
- Resting place: Saint Raymonds Cemetery, New York
- Police career
- Department: Port Authority Police Department (PAPD)
- Service years: 2000–2001
- Rank: Police Officer
- Awards: 9/11 Heroes Medal of Valor

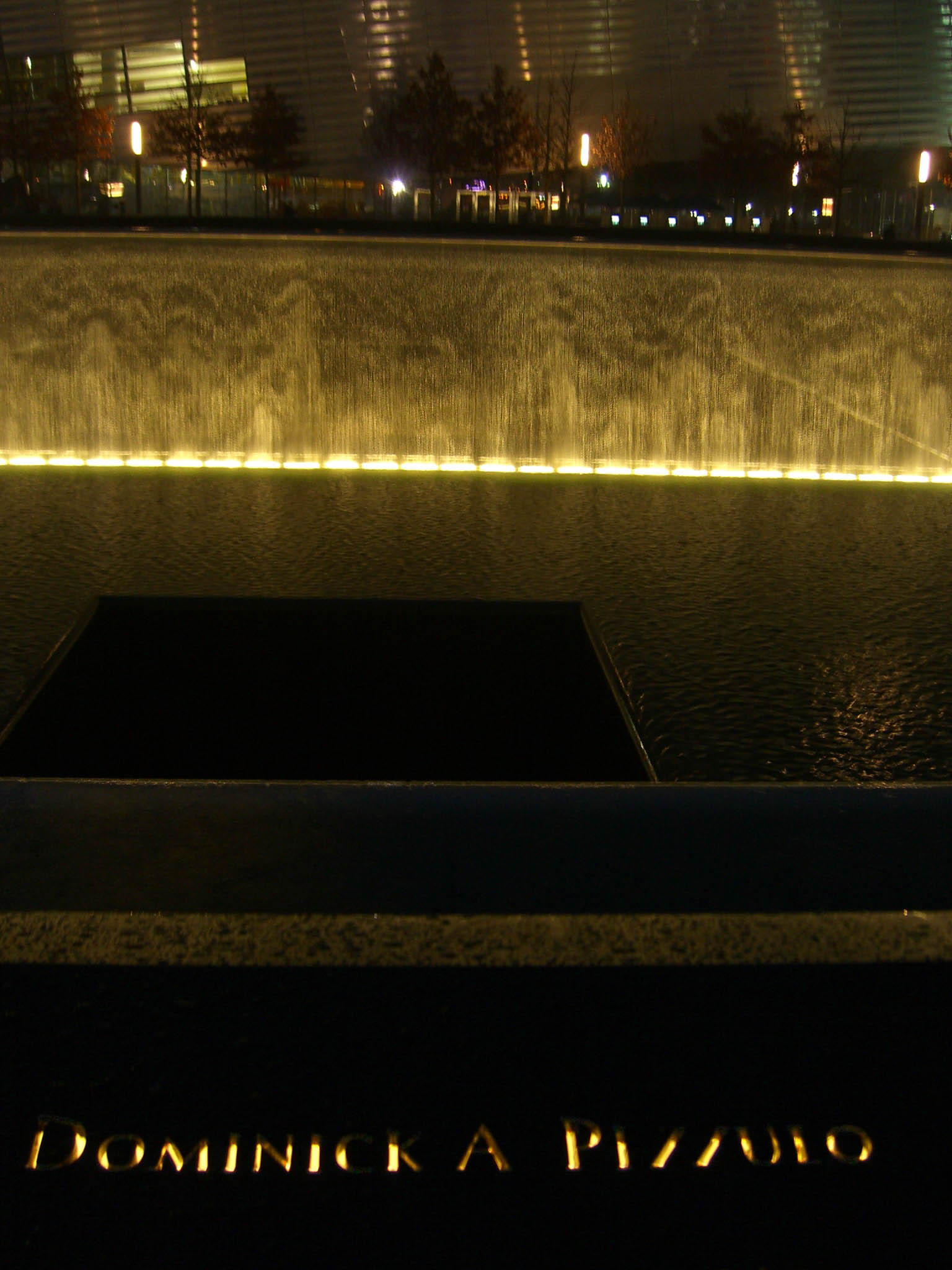
At the National September 11 Memorial, Pezzulo's name is located on Panel S-29 of the South Pool, along with those of other first responders.

Dominick A. Pezzulo (August 15, 1965 – September 11, 2001) was an Italian-American Port Authority of New York and New Jersey Police Department (PAPD) officer who died in the September 11 attacks in lower Manhattan, New York City in 2001.

In the early morning of September 11, he volunteered to assist PAPD Sergeant John McLoughlin with the rescue effort in the first World Trade Center building along with Officer Will Jimeno. After a brief overlook of the common area, the floor shook as the South Tower collapsed just 56 minutes after being struck by United Airlines Flight 175. With only ten seconds defining the collapse from 110 floors to the ground, the men dashed for the elevator shaft. Only Pezzulo, McLoughlin and Jimeno would survive the initial hit. As he struggled to lift debris from Officer Jimeno, the North Tower collapsed, causing more rubble, concrete, steel and ash to fall on the already existing pile of rubble formed by the collapse of the South Tower. Pezzulo was pinned, and in an effort to alert rescuers to their whereabouts, he fired a single shot into the air before dying.

He was portrayed in the Oliver Stone movie World Trade Center by Jay Hernandez.

== Early life ==
Dominick was born in Italy to Dino and Victoria Pezzulo. He was named after his grandfather Domenico Pezzulo. His nickname was Mimmo.

Jeanette Pezzulo met her husband Dominick while they were attending Herbert Lehman High School in the Bronx. Although they knew each other from the neighborhood and school, they didn't start dating until they finished high school. Ms. Pezzulo, now a School Aide and Local 372 member at Lehman, was struck by how considerate Dominick was during their first date. "We went to the World Trade Center," she recalled. "We were by the water fountain and he was concerned that I might get wet. That impressed me."

Pezzulo also returned to teach auto repair, math and computer technology.

After seven years as a teacher, Pezzulo became a police officer for the Port Authority of New York and New Jersey Police Department. He was stationed at the Port Authority Bus Terminal. Pezzulo was on his new job for only 13 months when he received the urgent telephone call on September 11, 2001, about the attacks. He and other officers commandeered a city bus and raced downtown to the World Trade Center. Dominick Pezzulo was 36 years old and had served with the Port Authority of New York and New Jersey Police Department for 13 months. He is survived by his wife and two young children and a brother, Tony.

== September 11 attacks ==
On the morning of September 11, 2001, Pezzulo and fellow officer and friend, Will Jimeno, were stationed at the entrances of the Port Authority Bus Terminal. Upon learning of the terrorist attacks on the World Trade Center, the pair volunteered to assist Sgt. John McLoughlin in the rescue effort. They were joined by two other Port Authority police officers, Antonio Rodrigues and Chris Amoroso.

The five officers were located in the concourse just outside the South Tower when at 9:59 a.m. the building collapse initiated. In the ten seconds it took for the collapse to reach ground zero McLoughlin, Pezzulo, and Jimeno were able to find cover in a nearby freight elevator and despite being trapped beneath the rubble, the trio survived the initial collapse. Amoroso and Rodrigues were unable to reach the elevator in time and both men were killed instantly.

Of the surviving trio Pezzulo was the only one to avoid serious injury and was able to free himself from the position he was initially trapped in. Working in very cramped conditions he immediately set about trying to free Jimeno who was trapped by the legs nearby. Despite repeated attempts, the large piece of concrete that had pinned Jimeno was too much for Pezzulo to move by himself and at 10:28 a.m. the North Tower collapsed. The collapse of the second tower triggered further settlement of the South Tower debris and Pezzulo became pinned beneath a falling concrete wall. Now mortally wounded, Officer Pezzulo fired a single shot from his Smith & Wesson 5946 9mm service weapon in an attempt to alert any nearby rescuers to the group's position beneath the rubble but died of his injuries shortly thereafter. Pezzulo's last words were: "Willie, don't forget. I died trying to save you guys."

On September 9, 2005, all of the public safety officers killed in the attacks were posthumously awarded the 9/11 Heroes Medal of Valor by President George W. Bush.

== Legacy ==
In the film World Trade Center by Oliver Stone, Pezzulo was portrayed by Jay Hernandez.

At the National September 11 Memorial, Pezzulo is memorialized at the South Pool, on Panel S-29, along with other first responders.

== See also ==
- Will Jimeno
- Dave Karnes
- Jason Thomas
- World Trade Center (film)
