= World Trade Center (film) =

2006 drama film by Oliver Stone

- Theatrical release poster
- Directed by: Oliver Stone
- Written by: Andrea Berloff
- Produced by: Moritz Borman; Debra Hill; Michael Shamberg; Stacey Sher
- Starring: Nicolas Cage; Michael Peña; Maggie Gyllenhaal; Maria Bello; Stephen Dorff; Jay Hernandez; Michael Shannon
- Cinematography: Seamus McGarvey
- Edited by: David Brenner; Julie Monroe
- Music by: Craig Armstrong
- Production companies: Double Feature Films; Intermedia Films; Ixtlan; Kernos Filmproduktionsgesellschaft & Company
- Distributed by: Paramount Pictures
- Release date: August 9, 2006
- Running time: 129 minutes
- Country: United States
- Language: English
- Budget: $65 million
- Box office: $163.5 million

World Trade Center is a 2006 American docudrama disaster film directed by Oliver Stone and written by Andrea Berloff. Starring Nicolas Cage and Michael Peña, the film is based on the experience of a team of Port Authority Police Officers during the September 11 attacks, in which they were trapped inside the rubble of the collapsed World Trade Center.

The film was shot between October 2005 and February 2006, and theatrically released in the United States by Paramount Pictures on August 9, 2006. It was met with generally positive reviews from critics and grossed $163 million worldwide.

== Plot ==
On September 11, 2001, members of the Port Authority Police are dispatched to Downtown Manhattan in response to the North Tower of the World Trade Center having been hit by a plane. The officers learn en route that the South Tower was hit by another plane. Sergeant John McLoughlin, veteran of the 1993 bombing, assembles a group of volunteers; officers Antonio Rodrigues, Will Jimeno and Dominick Pezzulo, to retrieve rescue equipment from Building 5. They are joined by Officer Christopher Amoroso.

As the five officers prepare to enter the North Tower from the concourse, the South Tower begins to collapse onto them, and McLoughlin realizes that their only chance of survival is to take cover in the elevator shaft. McLoughlin, Jimeno, and Pezzulo are the only survivors, but they are trapped beneath the rubble. Pezzulo tries but fails to free Jimeno, whose lower half is pinned. McLoughlin, who is also pinned, listens helplessly as the North Tower begins to collapse. Pezzulo is fatally injured when a concrete slab crushes his torso, but manages to fire his sidearm once into the air, in an attempt to alert rescuers to their whereabouts just before dying. Jimeno and McLoughlin spend painful, terrifying hours under the rubble telling each other about their lives. Meanwhile, their families try to learn if they are still alive.

When Building 7 collapses, both men scream and accept their demise, but they survive without further harm. McLoughlin tries to keep Jimeno awake by encouraging him to repeatedly pull on metal rebar that potential rescuers might hear. Hours pass, and McLoughlin falls in and out of consciousness. Both agree to stay alive for one another.

Two United States Marines, Dave Karnes and Jason Thomas, who are searching for survivors, hear the noise produced by Jimeno and find the men, calling for help to dig them out. After hours and effort by first responders, Jimeno is rescued first, and then hours later McLoughlin is lifted out of the debris in critical condition. Both men are reunited with their families at the hospital and undergo medical treatment, including extensive surgeries, and McLoughlin is placed in a medically induced coma.

Two years later, Jimeno and McLoughlin, both medically retired from duty, attend a celebratory barbecue with their families. The epilogue reveals that both men were two of twenty people found alive at Ground Zero, and they were numbers eighteen and nineteen, respectively. Dave Karnes reenlisted in the Marines and served two tours in the Iraq War.

== Cast ==
- Nicolas Cage as Sergeant John McLoughlin
- Michael Peña as Officer Will Jimeno
- Maria Bello as Donna McLoughlin
- Maggie Gyllenhaal as Allison Jimeno
- Stephen Dorff as NYPD ESU Rescueman Scott Strauss
- Jon Bernthal as Officer Christopher Amoroso
- Jay Hernandez as Officer Dominick Pezzulo
- Michael Shannon as Marine Sergeant Dave Karnes
- Donna Murphy as Judy Jonas: a neighbor of the McLoughlin family in Goshen, NY; and wife of FDNY Captain John "Jay" Jonas (FDNY Ladder Company 6).
- Brad William Henke as Allison's Brother Jerry
- Peter McRobbie as Allison's Father
- Julie Adams as Allison's Grandmother
- Frank Whaley as Paramedic Chuck Sereika
- Jude Ciccolella as Inspector Lawrence Fields
- Nicholas Turturro as Officer Colovito
- Danny Nucci as Officer Giraldi
- William Mapother as Marine Sergeant Jason Thomas
- Tom Wright as Officer Reynolds
- Wass Stevens as Officer Pat McLoughlin
- Armando Riesco as Officer Antonio Jose Rodrigues
- Ned Eisenberg as Officer Polnicki
- Dara Coleman as Officer Boel
- Nick Damici as Lieutenant John Kassimatis
- Connor Paolo as Steven McLoughlin
- Arthur Nascarella as FDNY Chief at Ground Zero
- Patti D'Arbanville as Donna's Friend
- Viola Davis as Mother in Hospital
- Will Jimeno as Port Authority Police Officer
- Aimee Mullins as Reporter
- Charles A. Gargano as Port Authority Police Commander

== Historical accuracy ==
The Port Authority police officers portrayed by Nicolas Cage and Michael Peña, John McLoughlin and Will Jimeno, and their wives, played by Maria Bello and Maggie Gyllenhaal, were involved with the writing and overall production. John McLoughlin and Will Jimeno said they wanted to have a film made to honor their rescuers and comrades who died on September 11, not for personal gain.

McLoughlin's wife Donna has said: "We got involved because we felt it needed to be done accurately. We wanted to do the right thing and I think the filmmakers wanted to do the right thing too." Both John McLoughlin and Will Jimeno appear at the end of the film during the barbecue scene.

The real ESU (Emergency Services Unit) police from New York who are depicted in the film—Scott Strauss and Paddy McGee—were on set as technical advisers. In addition, the firemen in the film were played by real FDNY members who served on 9/11. All of them enthusiastically supported the film and its intention to accurately portray the rescue of McLoughlin and Jimeno.

Jeanette Pezzulo, the widow of Port Authority police officer Dominick Pezzulo (who died in the attacks and is played by Jay Hernandez in the film), expressed anger with the film, criticizing McLoughlin's and Jimeno's participation in its production. She is quoted as saying, "My thing is: this man died for you. How do you do this to his family?" Staten Island resident Jamie Amoroso, whose husband also died during the rescue operation, also expressed her anger over the film and said she did "not need a movie" to tell her "what a hero" her husband was.

Many major American newspapers ran editorials accusing Stone of having his film examine 9/11 conspiracy theories because Stone was known for examining various conspiracy theories surrounding the Kennedy assassination in JFK. However, Stone has stated that the film does not explore the conspiracy theories surrounding 9/11. He, the producers, and the real McLoughlin and Jimeno, have said the film is a simple dedication to the heroism and sadness of the day with little-to-no political themes.

The film has been accused of not providing a fair portrayal of the character and motives of rescuer Dave Karnes and paramedic Chuck Sereika. They did not participate in the making of the film and felt their roles of being the first rescuers to reach the trapped men did not receive enough screen time. Sereika began treating and extricating Jimeno a full 20 minutes before officers from the New York City Police Department's Emergency Services Unit arrived.

Certain details about the story were altered. For instance, the film depicts McLoughlin's team being completely oblivious to the crash into the South Tower, having arrived at the World Trade Center site and entered the concourse before United Airlines Flight 175 struck; in reality, Will Jimeno has clarified in interviews that they were well aware of the second impact as it occurred while they were en route to the complex. Early in the film, there is reference to Derek Jeter hitting a home run on Saturday (9/8 vs. Boston). Jeter not only did not homer in this game, he did not even play.

== Non-fictional characters ==
John McLoughlin graduated from the State University of New York at Oswego, where he was a member of the Sigma Tau Chi fraternity. He was rescued after 22 hours, the 19th of 20 people pulled out of the rubble alive. Doctors kept him in an induced coma for six weeks. He underwent 27 surgeries and spent nearly three months in the hospital and rehabilitation. Four months after their rescue, McLoughlin and Jimeno—who both have since retired—took part in a ceremony at Ground Zero to watch as the final column was removed. When all the uniformed officers walked out of The Pit, the last two were McLoughlin and Jimeno. On June 11, 2002, McLoughlin received the Port Authority's Medal of Honor. He resided in Goshen, New York.

Will Jimeno was born on November 26, 1967, in Colombia but immigrated to New York City as a boy with his family. At the time of the attacks, he was a rookie cop assigned to the Port Authority Bus Terminal. He was pulled out of the rubble after 13 hours, the 18th of 20 people pulled out alive. On June 11, 2002, Jimeno received the Port Authority's Medal of Honor. Jimeno and McLoughlin make a cameo in the film.

Christopher Amoroso was born on June 1, 1972, and raised in North Bergen, New Jersey where he attended North Bergen High School. Since 2010 the Chopper 2002 Foundation has presented their annual invitational softball tournament in North Bergen on the first weekend of June.

Dominick Pezzulo was born on August 15, 1965, in Italy to Dino and Victoria Pezzulo. He was named after his grandfather Domenico Pezzulo. Pezzulo taught auto repair, math and computer technology. After seven years as a teacher, Pezzulo became a police officer for the Port Authority of New York and New Jersey Police Department 13 months before the attack. He was stationed at the Port Authority Bus Terminal. On September 9, 2005, all of the public safety officers killed on September 11, 2001, were posthumously awarded the 9/11 Heroes Medal of Valor by President George W. Bush. At the National 9/11 Memorial, Pezzulo is memorialized at the South Pool, on Panel S-29. In his birthplace of Giano Vetusto, Italy, a plaque has been erected on the door of the house he grew up in.

Bruce A. Reynolds was born in Inwood and resided in Knowlton Township, New Jersey with his wife and two kids. He joined the Port Authority in 1986 and was stationed at the bus terminal on 42nd Street. On September 11, 2001 - Reynolds was sent to the World Trade Center from his post at the George Washington Bridge. Despite having respiratory problems, he went into the South Tower to help with the rescue effort.

David W. Karnes was born c. 1958 and spent 23 years in the Marine Corps infantry. He left his accounting office at Deloitte and Touche in Wilton, Connecticut soon after witnessing the attacks on television to assist in the rescue efforts. Karnes spent nine days at the site before returning to his office. He then reenlisted in the Marine Corps Reserve and went on to serve in the Philippines and Iraq. He served for 17 months, including two tours of duty in Iraq. Karnes did not cooperate in the making of Stone's World Trade Center movie due to Stone's antipathy towards U.S. President George W. Bush. Some critics took issue with the portrayal in the film. Rebecca Liss of Slate magazine observed, "The film seems to overplay his zeal without conveying his motivations and reasoning." It notes he is unfairly portrayed as "a robotic soldier of Christ—a little wacky and simplistic."

Jason Thomas was born c. 1974 and was dropping his daughter off at the home of his mother on Long Island when she told him about the attacks. Despite having left active duty in August 2001, Thomas drove to Manhattan to assist in the rescue efforts, telling the Associated Press: "Someone needed help. It didn't matter who. I didn't even have a plan. But I have all this training as a Marine, and all I could think was, 'My city is in need.'" As of 2013, Thomas is serving in the United States Air Force as a medical technician. His portrayal by a white actor in the film generated controversy, although the producers claimed that they were unaware that the real Thomas was black until they had already started filming. On February 11, 2007, Extreme Makeover: Home Edition aired a special two-hour episode about Thomas and his family. Following the attacks, Thomas and his wife had moved their four children from New York to Columbus, Ohio. The house they bought began to deteriorate and the show intervened to help them. On September 2, 2013, Channel 4 broadcast The Lost Hero of 9/11 which detailed Thomas's involvement in the rescue operation following the collapse of both towers. As of 2018, Thomas was living in Columbus with his wife Kirsti and their children. He worked as an officer for the Ohio Supreme Court. Thomas is in 15 Septembers Later which has appeared on the History Channel.

== Reception ==
=== Box office ===
In its opening weekend, the film made $18.7 million in the U.S. and Canada. In total, the film grossed $70.3 million in North America, and $93 million in other territories, for a worldwide total of $163.2 million.

=== Critical response ===
On Rotten Tomatoes the film holds an approval rating of 66% based on 234 reviews, and an average rating of 6.70/10. The website's critics consensus states: "As a visually stunning tribute to lives lost in tragedy, World Trade Center succeeds unequivocally, and it is more politically muted than many of Stone's other works." On Metacritic, the film has a weighted average score of 66 out of 100, based on 40 critics, indicating "generally favorable reviews". Audiences polled by CinemaScore gave the film an average grade of "A−" on an A+ to F scale.

The producers met with all relevant September 11 victims groups before production began to inform them of the intent. After its release, they, the NYPD, and the FDNY were very pleased with it. Former mayor Rudy Giuliani, former Governor George Pataki, and then-Fire Commissioner Nicholas Scoppetta, as well as representatives from the NY Port Authority, were at the premiere of the film at the Ziegfeld Theatre in Manhattan.

== Home media ==
The film was released on DVD and HD DVD and Blu-Ray on December 12, 2006. A 4k Blu-ray was released by Shout! Factory on August 12, 2025.

== See also ==
- List of cultural references to the September 11 attacks
- Collapse of the World Trade Center
- United 93, another 2006 film, directed by Paul Greengrass, which centered around the events aboard United Airlines Flight 93.
- List of firefighting films
