= New York Police =

New York Police may refer to:

- New York City Police Department (NYPD)
- New York State Police (NYSP)
- Port Authority Police Department (PAPD)
