= Will Jimeno =

September 11 survivor (born 1967)

- Born: William Jose Jimeno; November 26, 1967 (age 58); Barranquilla, Colombia
- Other names: Will; Willy
- Police career
- Department: Port Authority Police Department (PAPD)
- Service years: 2000–2004
- Rank: 2000 – Commissioned as a police officer
- Badge no.: 1117
- Awards: Port Authority Police Department Medal of Honor
- Other work: Author

William Jose Jimeno (born November 26, 1967) is a Colombian-American author and retired Port Authority of New York and New Jersey Police Department officer who survived the September 11 attacks in 2001. He was buried under the rubble for a total of 13 hours, but survived, along with fellow Port Authority officer John McLoughlin. He has written two books regarding the experience. The entrapment and rescue were portrayed in the 2006 Oliver Stone film World Trade Center, with Jimeno portrayed by Michael Peña.

Jimeno was born in 1967 in Colombia but immigrated to New York City as a boy with his family. On January 2, 2008, Jimeno appeared on the television game show Deal or No Deal and won $271,000.

== Career ==
At the time of the attacks, he was a rookie cop assigned to the Port Authority Bus Terminal. He saw the shadow of American Airlines Flight 11, the airplane that seconds later hit the North Tower of the World Trade Center. He rode to the WTC site with 20 other Port Authority police officers in a commandeered bus.

The collapse of the South Tower trapped Jimeno and two other Port Authority officers, led by Sgt. McLoughlin, under the concourse between the Twin Towers. Only Jimeno and McLoughlin survived. Dominick Pezzulo survived the initial collapse but was killed by the collapse of the North Tower while he was trying to free Jimeno.

A USA Today account observed:

Sometimes they yelled for help. But mostly the 48-year-old sergeant, a 21-year veteran, and the 33-year-old rookie talked intimately, sometimes revealing personal things – about kids, families, feelings – that they had never shared with anyone. Jimeno asked the Sergeant to deliver a message over the radio to his wife, Allison, who was seven months pregnant. They had received no response earlier, but he thought maybe their radio call would be picked up on a police tape recording. "Attention," Sgt. McLoughlin announced, "Officer Jimeno requests that his baby girl be named Olivia." His wife had liked the name. He hadn't been so sure. Now, as he prepared to die, he wanted to think of his baby girl, Olivia.

The two men were located and extricated after former U.S. Marines Sergeant Jason Thomas and Staff Sergeant Dave Karnes heard their cries for help. Both survivors, especially McLoughlin, were severely injured. They required several surgeries and months of hospitalization for recovery and rehabilitation. On June 11, 2002, McLoughlin (with a walker) and Jimeno (with a limp) walked across a stage at Madison Square Garden to receive the Port Authority's Medal of Honor.

== Books ==
Jimeno is the author of two books, including one for children, regarding the events of 9/11.

Year	Title	Publisher	ISBN	Pages
2021	Immigrant, American, Survivor: A Little Boy Who Grew Up To Be All Three (Childrens book/Autobiography)	Charles Ricciardi	978-0999698655	57
2021	Sunrise Through the Darkness: A Survivor's Account of Learning to Live Again Beyond 9/11 (Biography/Autobiography)	University Professors Press	978-1939686992	220

== See also ==
- John McLoughlin (police officer)
- Dominick Pezzulo
- Dave Karnes
- Jason Thomas (Marine)
