= John McLoughlin (police officer) =

American police officer, survivor of 9/11 attacks (born 1953)

- Born: June 6, 1953 (age 73); New York City, U.S.
- Other name: Johnny
- Relatives: Married
- Police career
- Department: Port Authority Police (PAPD)
- Service years: 1980–2001
- Rank: Commissioned as a Patrolman - 1980: Sergeant - 1993
- Awards: Port Authority Police Department Medal of Honor

John McLoughlin (born June 6, 1953) is a retired American police officer who is known for being one of the two Port Authority of New York and New Jersey police officers who survived after being trapped under the rubble of the World Trade Center during the September 11 attacks. His rescue and that of William Jimeno were later the subject of Oliver Stone's film World Trade Center in 2006, in which McLoughlin was portrayed by actor Nicolas Cage.

McLoughlin graduated from the State University of New York at Oswego, where he was a member of the Sigma Tau Chi fraternity.

== September 11, 2001 ==
McLoughlin led a team of officers, including Jimeno, who were on the main concourse between the two towers when the South Tower collapsed. The five ran toward a nearby freight elevator, and were buried in the ensuing collapse of the concourse. Officers Antonio Rodrigues and Chris Amoroso were killed immediately. McLoughlin, Jimeno and a third officer, Dominick Pezzulo, were trapped but alive. The freight elevator withstood the devastation, creating breathing room that saved their lives. Pezzulo, who was the only one not pinned, immediately managed to free himself and tried to free Jimeno, but the subsequent collapse of the North Tower caused shifting and additional debris falling through. Pezzulo was mortally wounded and died minutes after the collapse. McLoughlin and Jimeno were rescued after former U.S. Marine Corps Sergeant Jason Thomas and Staff Sergeant Dave Karnes heard their cries for help about ten hours after they were first buried.

As we were walking we were yelling at the top of our lungs 'United States Marines, can anyone hear us?'" Karnes described. "As we approached the depression of the South Tower I thought I heard something. Indeed it was some muffled call for help, I assured them that Thomas and I were both looking for them so keep yelling so we can find you."

The two men were eventually rescued after hours of painstaking work — Jimeno after 13 hours and McLoughlin after 22 hours. McLoughlin was gravely injured. Doctors kept him in an induced coma for six weeks. He underwent 27 surgeries and spent nearly three months in the hospital and rehabilitation. Four months after their rescue, McLoughlin and Jimeno — who both have since retired — took part in a ceremony at Ground Zero to watch as the final column was removed. When all the uniformed officers walked out of The Pit, the two were last to leave. Only 20 people were pulled out of the rubble alive; Jimeno and McLoughlin were numbers 18 and 19. On June 11, 2002, McLoughlin (with a walker) and Jimeno (with a limp) walked across a stage at Madison Square Garden to receive the Port Authority's Medal of Honor.

The film World Trade Center (2006) tells the story of McLoughlin (played by Nicolas Cage) and William Jimeno (portrayed by Michael Peña). The two make a small appearance at the BBQ greeting them.

== See also ==
- Will Jimeno
- Dominick Pezzulo
- Dave Karnes
- Jason Thomas (Marine)
- Genelle Guzman-McMillan
- Ronald Paul Bucca
