= Jason Thomas (Marine) =

United States Marine (born 1974)

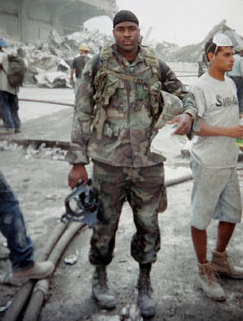
- Thomas standing at the ruins of the World Trade Center in 2001, days after the attacks.
- Born: July 4, 1974 (age 52)
- Spouse: Kirsti Thomas
- Children: 5
- Military career
- Allegiance: United States of America
- Branch: United States Marine Corps; United States Air Force
- Service years: 1993–2006 (Marine Corps); 2006–present (Air Force)
- Rank: Sergeant (Marine Corps); Technical Sergeant (Air Force)
- Conflicts: War in Afghanistan; Iraq War
- Other work: Security Officer for the Ohio Supreme Court (2004–present)

Jason Thomas (born July 4, 1974) is a United States Marine who located and rescued people in the aftermath of collapse of the World Trade Center in New York City after the September 11 attacks in 2001. With fellow U.S. Marine David Karnes, he helped find a pair of Port Authority Police officers buried in the rubble of the World Trade Center.

== Career ==
=== 2001: September 11 attacks ===
On September 11, 2001, Thomas was dropping his daughter off at the home of his mother on Long Island when she told him planes had struck the towers. The 27-year-old Thomas, having left active duty in August 2001, quickly put on his Marine uniform (camouflage utilities), sped to Manhattan, and had just parked his car when the North Tower of the World Trade Center collapsed.

Thomas told the Associated Press:

"Someone needed help. It didn't matter who," he said. "I didn't even have a plan. But I have all this training as a Marine, and all I could think was, 'My city is in need.'"

Thomas ran into another Marine veteran, Staff Sergeant David Karnes. Thomas presented a plan for a search-and-rescue mission in the area, and he and Karnes tried to enlist other Marines and soldiers on site to help. They decided to go it alone when they were told the mission was dangerous. "I found a couple of guys, but it wasn't enough, to them, to start a search and rescue," he said. "I remember myself and Karnes saying, 'We're going to start the search and rescue with or without you because someone needs us.'"

Carrying an infantryman's shovel, the two climbed the debris, calling out, "Is anyone down there? United States Marines!" They met a retired EMT, Chuck Sereika, who crawled down into the 50-foot-deep hole where the 2 Port Authority police officers (Will Jimeno and John McLoughlin) were trapped. Chuck began treating Will's injuries as fire in the hole intensified, threatening the lives of the rescuers, who nevertheless continued their rescue, occasionally climbing out of the hole to clear their lungs of smoke and recover from the heat. After 20 minutes, the three rescuers were joined by NYFD and NY Emergency Services Unit members. After 5 hours of digging and using the "jaws of life", the two Port Authority Police Department officers were rescued. A 3rd Port Authority police officer, Dominick Pezzulo, was trapped with Will and John but was mortally wounded by debris from the WTC 7 building collapse while trying to extricate Will from the rubble. His last act was to fire his service weapon through a hole in the debris to try and signal for help.

Thomas said he returned to Ground Zero daily to pitch in before attempting to put the events behind him. He did not even tell his five children about his rescues. He had only identified himself to Karnes and others as "Sergeant Thomas".

Thomas is now serving in the United States Air Force as a medical technician since 2006.

Thomas was portrayed in Oliver Stone's feature film World Trade Center by William Mapother. This portrayal by a white actor generated controversy, and the producers stated that they were unaware that the real Thomas was black until they had already started filming.

On February 11, 2007, Extreme Makeover: Home Edition aired a special two-hour episode about Thomas and his family. Following the attacks, Thomas and his wife moved their four children from New York to Whitehall, Ohio. The house they bought began deteriorating, and the show intervened to help them.

On September 2, 2013, Channel 4 detailed Thomas' involvement in the rescue operation following the collapse of the towers in the UK broadcast The Lost Hero of 9/11.

== After 9/11 ==
As of 2018, Thomas lives in Whitehall, Ohio, with his wife Kirsti and their children. He works as an officer for the Ohio Supreme Court and a Technical Sergeant in the United States Air Force.

== See also ==
- John McLoughlin (police officer)
- Will Jimeno
- Dominick Pezzulo
- Dave Karnes
