= Dave Karnes =

United States Marine (born 1958)

David W. Karnes
- Born: December 12, 1958 (age 67)
- Military career
- Allegiance: United States
- Branch: United States Marine Corps
- Service years: 1978–2007
- Rank: Staff sergeant
- Unit: 3rd Marine Division
- Conflicts: Persian Gulf War War on terror: Operation Enduring Freedom; Iraq War
- Awards: Iraq Campaign Medal; Global War on Terrorism Expeditionary Medal; Global War on Terrorism Service Medal

David W. Karnes (born December 12, 1958) is a former United States Marine who, with fellow U.S. Marine Jason Thomas, located and helped rescue two police officers of the Port Authority Police Department trapped in the rubble from the September 11 attacks after the collapse of the World Trade Center in 2001.

== Career ==
=== 2001: September 11 attacks ===
Karnes, an accountant by profession, left his office at Deloitte and Touche in Wilton, Connecticut, after witnessing the attacks on television. Karnes said to his co-workers, "You guys may not realize it, but this country is at war."

According to a Slate magazine profile, Karnes drove to a local church and asked the pastor and parishioners to say a prayer that God would lead him to survivors. A devout Christian, Karnes often turned to prayer when faced with decisions.

Having spent 23 years in the Marine Corps infantry, he got a regulation hair cut, put on his Marine Corps camouflage utility uniform, and obtained equipment that included rappelling gear. He drove from Connecticut to the World Trade Center to assist with the disaster. At the site, he ran into another Marine, Jason Thomas, and walked with him into the rubble. At the time, he only knew his fellow Marine as "Sgt. Thomas". His full identity was not discovered until five years later.

According to a Defense Department profile of Karnes:

As we were walking we were yelling at the top of our lungs 'United States Marines, can anyone hear us?'" Karnes described. 'As we approached the depression of the south tower I thought I heard something. Indeed it was some muffled call for help, I assured them that Thomas and I were both looking for them so keep yelling so we can find you.'

Karnes instructed Thomas to position himself on some high rubble for visibility and to guide any responding rescuers to the trapped men. To which he found an operating engineer with a flashlight, who climbed down and spoke with Will, one of the officers. After that, the operating engineer climbed through the rubble, and summoned the FDNY.

After Karnes called his wife and sister on his cell phone with instructions to relay to the authorities his whereabouts, he and Thomas were able to find two survivors.

The three men found Will Jimeno and John McLoughlin, a pair of police officers buried in the rubble. Karnes spent a total of nine days at the site before returning to his office. Upon returning home, he reenlisted in the Marine Corps Reserve and went on to serve in the Philippines and Iraq. He served for 17 months, including two tours of duty in Iraq.

== In popular culture ==
In the 2006 Oliver Stone movie, World Trade Center, which tells this story, Karnes is played by Michael Shannon. Karnes did not cooperate in the making of Stone's World Trade Center movie due to Stone's antipathy towards U.S. President George W. Bush. Some critics took issue with the portrayal in the film. Rebecca Liss of Slate magazine observed, "The film seems to overplay his zeal without conveying his motivations and reasoning." It notes he is unfairly portrayed as "a robotic soldier of Christ—a little wacky and simplistic."

== See also ==
- John McLoughlin (police officer)
- Dominick Pezzulo
- Jason Thomas (Marine)
- Will Jimeno
- Genelle Guzman-McMillan
