= 9/11 Heroes Medal of Valor =

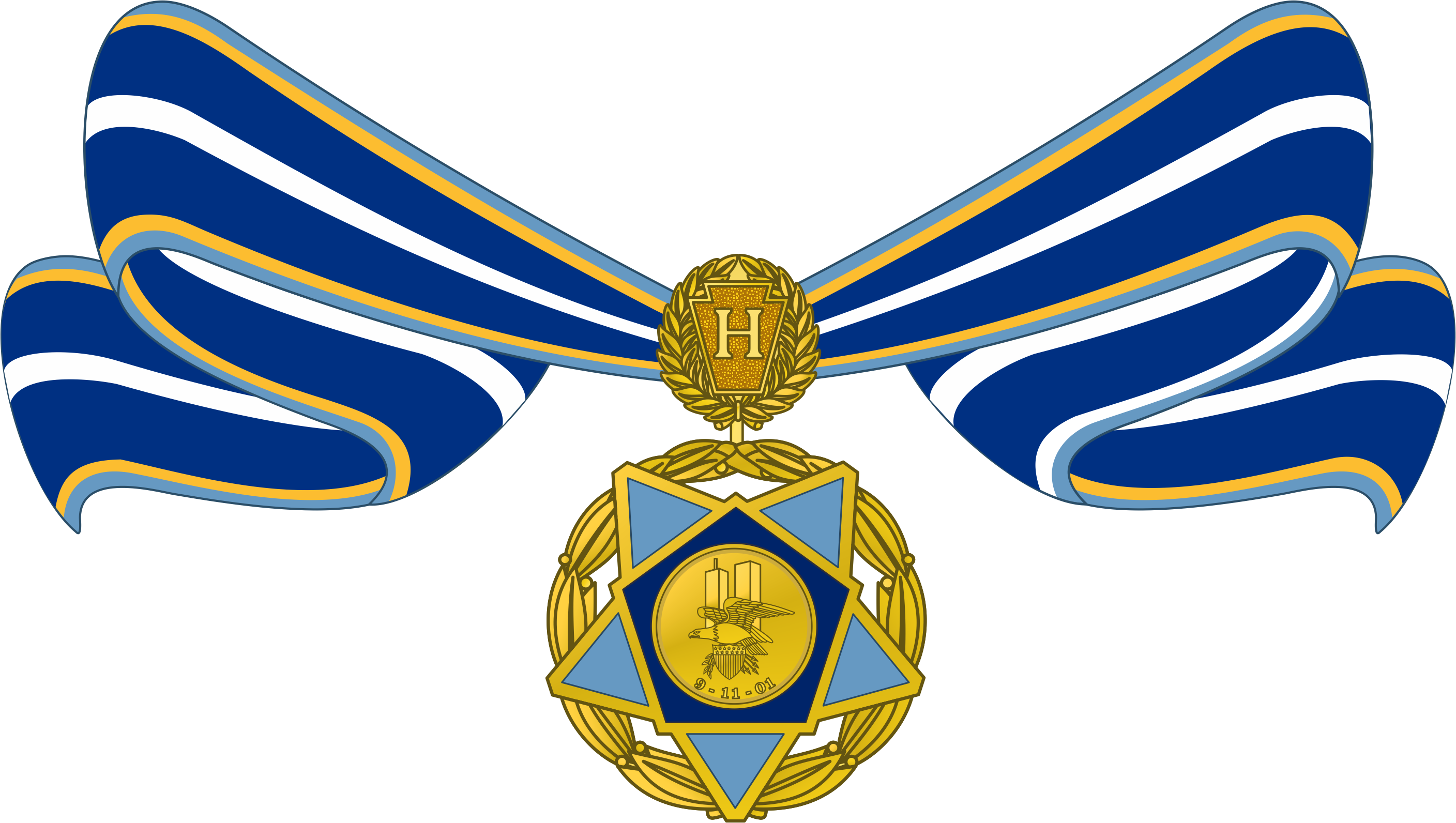
- Country: United States
- Presented by: Federal Government of the United States
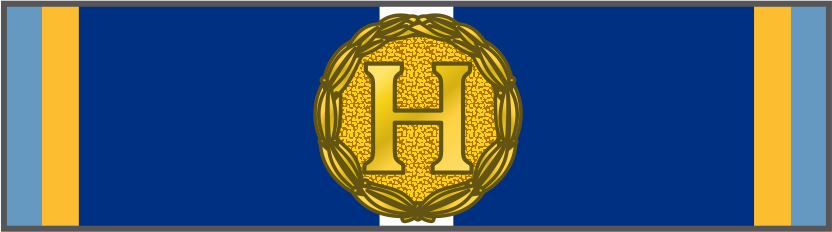
- Ribbon

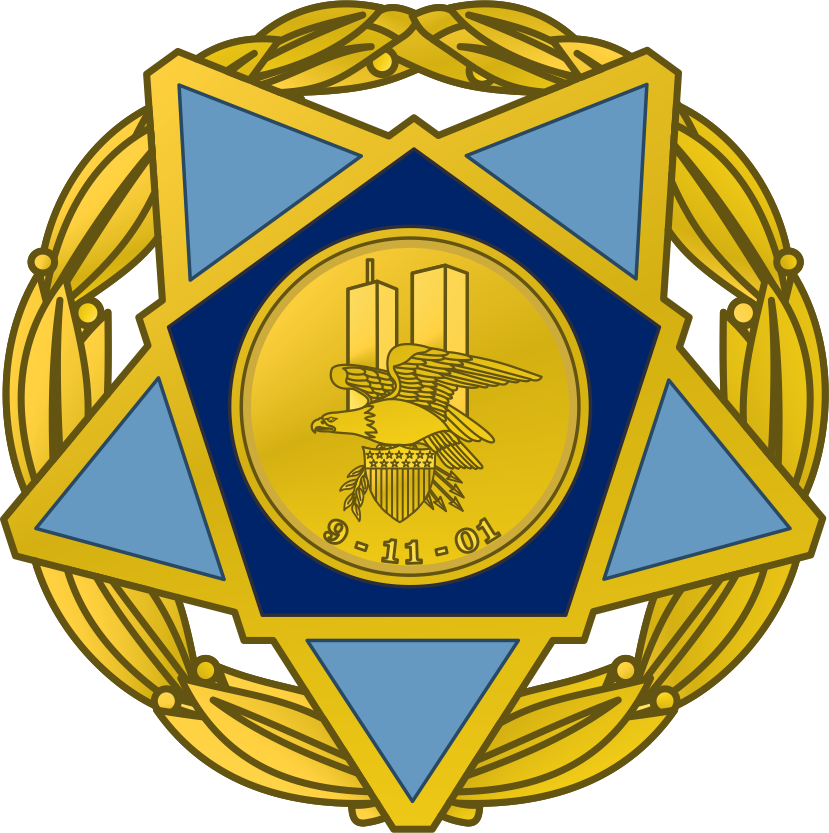
- Obverse

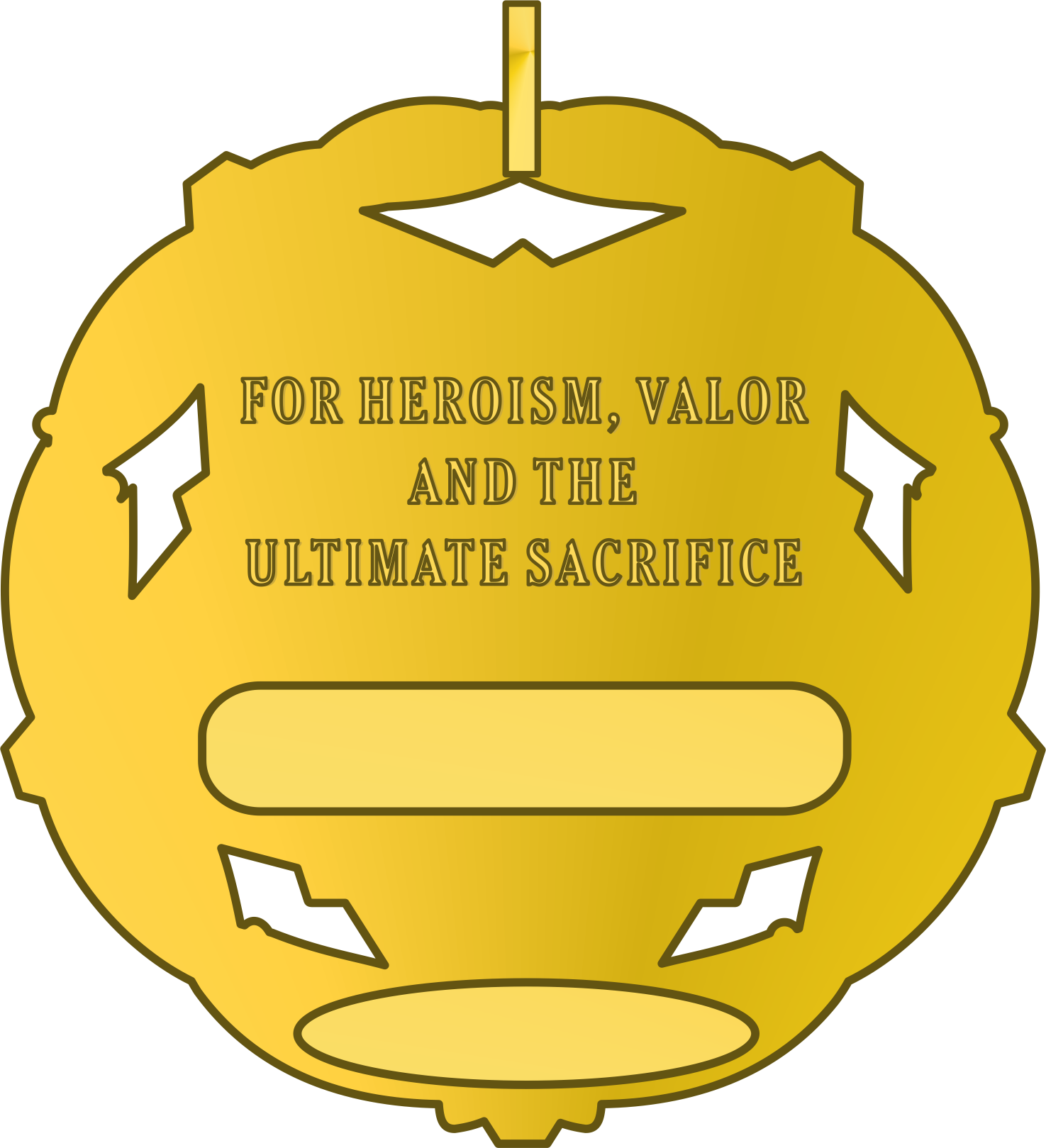
- Reverse
- First award: September 9, 2005
- Final award: September 9, 2005
- Website: www.ojp.usdoj.gov/911medalofvalor/

The 9/11 Heroes Medal of Valor is a decoration in the United States, created specifically to honor the 442 public safety officers who were killed in the line of duty during the September 11, 2001 terrorist attacks at the World Trade Center and the empty wing of The Pentagon.

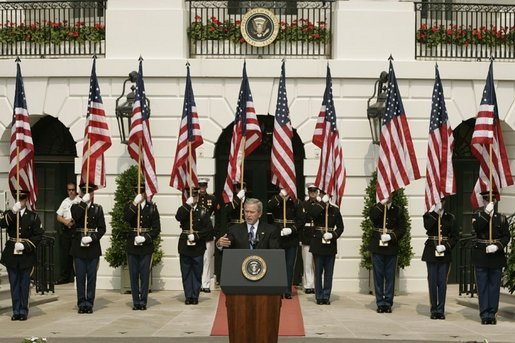
President George W. Bush gestures as he addresses guests on the South Lawn of the White House, Friday, Sept. 9, 2005, during the 9/11 Heroes Medal of Valor Award Ceremony and to honor the courage and commitment of emergency services personnel who died on Sept. 11, 2001. White House photo by Paul Morse

The medals were presented by President George W. Bush to the families of the fallen officers at The White House on September 9, 2005.

In November 2018, President Donald Trump signed the Medal of Valor bill, sponsored by Rep. Joe Crowley D-N.Y, adding first responders who died of Ground-Zero related illnesses to become eligible for the award.

The 9/11 Heroes Medal of Valor, which intentionally resembles the Public Safety Officer Medal of Valor and the military's Medal of Honor, is a gilt, light blue-enameled, five-pointed, upside-down star (i.e. one arm points downwards), surrounded by a wreath of laurel. The center has a dark blue-enameled pentagon (representing The Pentagon), with a gilt disc bearing the twin towers of the World Trade Center, the American eagle holding the shield of the United States and laurel, and the date "9. 11. 01". The Medal is suspended on a gilt disc bearing a letter "H" (for Heroism) inside a keystone, (representing the Keystone State of Pennsylvania) surrounded by a wreath of laurels, which is in turn suspended on a neck ribbon, blue with gold and light blue edge stripes and a white center stripe.

Because the 9/11 Heroes Medal of Valor has only been authorized posthumously, and only for one action, it is generally considered a commemorative decoration not intended for wear; therefore the Medal does not come with lapel pin.

== Similar medals ==
- Medal of Honor
- Public Safety Officer Medal of Valor
- Chaplain's Medal for Heroism
