= Port Authority of New York and New Jersey Police Department =

Law enforcement agency in New York and New Jersey

- PAPD Patch

- Shield of the PAPD

- Flag of the PAPD
- Common name: Port Authority Police Department
- Abbreviation: PAPD
- Motto: Pride - Service - Distinction

Agency overview
- Formed: June 1, 1928
- Preceding agency: Port of New York Authority

Jurisdictional structure
- Operations jurisdiction: New York, New York & New Jersey, U.S.
- Legal jurisdiction: New York and New Jersey
- General nature: Local civilian police

Operational structure
- Headquarters: The Port Authority Technical Center Jersey City, New Jersey
- Police Officers: 2,100
- Agency executive: Edward T. Cetnar, Superintendent of Police/Director, Public Safety Department
- Parent agency: Port Authority of New York and New Jersey

Facilities
- Commands/Facilities: List: Howland Hook Marine Terminal; Port Jersey Marine Terminal; Port Newark-Elizabeth Marine Terminal; John F. Kennedy International Airport; LaGuardia Airport; Newark Liberty International Airport; Teterboro Airport; AirTrain JFK; AirTrain Newark; PATH; Lincoln Tunnel; Holland Tunnel; George Washington Bridge; Goethals Bridge; Outerbridge Crossing; Bayonne Bridge; Port Authority Bus Terminal; George Washington Bridge Bus Station; Journal Square Transportation Center; World Trade Center; The Teleport Business Complex; Port Authority Technical Center

Website
- panynj.gov

The Port Authority of New York and New Jersey Police Department, or Port Authority Police Department (PAPD), is a law enforcement agency in New York and New Jersey, the duties of which are to protect and to enforce state and city laws at all the facilities owned or operated by the Port Authority of New York and New Jersey (PANYNJ), the bi-state agency running airports, seaports, and many bridges and tunnels within the Port of New York and New Jersey. Additionally, the PAPD is responsible for other PANYNJ properties including three bus terminals (the Port Authority Bus Terminal, the George Washington Bridge Bus Station and Journal Square Transportation Center), the World Trade Center in Lower Manhattan, and the PATH train system. The PAPD is the largest transit-related police force in the United States.

== History ==
The Port Authority Police Department was created in June 1928 when 40 men were selected to police the Goethals Bridge and Outerbridge Crossing. These original officers were known as Bridgemen, nine of whom were later promoted to the rank of Bridgemaster, or Sergeant.

The force grew in number with the opening of Port Authority facilities such as the Holland Tunnel in 1927, three Metropolitan Airports and a Marine Terminal in the 1940s, and the Port Authority Bus Terminal in the 1950s. The Port Authority also assumed control of the Hudson and Manhattan Railroad, rebranding it as the PATH.

== Airports ==
The PAPD protects three major airports: John F. Kennedy International, LaGuardia, and Newark Liberty International which handle over 140 million air passengers, over 1.2 million flights, and over 2.2 million tons of air cargo annually. Together, the three New York area airports create the largest airport system in the entire United States. The department runs vehicle checkpoints, responds to all aircraft incidents, and assists travelers from all parts of the world. The agency is also responsible for escorting and protecting visiting dignitaries. The PAPD also patrols the Port Authority-owned Teterboro Airport in New Jersey, which is much smaller than the other three airports and operates only general aviation aircraft.

The PAPD is also responsible for fire fighting and crash emergency rescue at the four airports and for all other aircraft emergency incidents. Police personnel assigned to fire and rescue duty are trained in all phases of aircraft rescue and firefighting. They have a large number of aircraft rescue fire fighting vehicles, known as "crash trucks".

== Marine terminals ==
Police operations at Port Newark-Elizabeth Marine Terminal, Howland Hook, Port Jersey, include traffic control and the prevention and investigation of cargo thefts.

== Structure ==
The department's headquarters is located at the Port Authority Technical Center in Jersey City, New Jersey. The nerve center of the force is the Central Police Desk, which is located at Journal Square. It is staffed around-the-clock and is the hub of the communications network. There, personnel are assigned to needed areas, all radio transmissions are monitored, and computer terminals are integrated into the NY & NJ Intelligence and Crime Information Systems as well as the National Crime Information Center (NCIC) in Washington, D.C. Information received from these sources is supplied to officers in the field when needed. Approximately 200,000 passengers use the PATH system daily. The system's stations are monitored by video surveillance to aid police personnel.

At the Holland and Lincoln Tunnels, the Bayonne, Goethals, and George Washington Bridges, and the Outerbridge Crossing, the duties of PAPD officers are patrol, traffic control, hazardous cargo inspections, truck weigh and emergency services, as well as enforcement for violations of motor vehicle laws. Police at these crossings have also instituted programs that maintain a constant campaign against drunk driving. The Port Authority operates the largest and busiest bus terminal in the nation, accommodating 57 million bus passengers and over 2.2 million bus movements in 2001. Police assignments demand a broad range of functions, everything from locating lost children to aiding everyday commuters. They are responsible for the general security of the facility utilizing a variety of patrol tactics. Police Officer/Social Worker teams patrol the bus terminal and identify youngsters who may be runaways, throwaways, or missing persons. They provide crisis intervention counseling, placement with social service agencies, and reunions with families when appropriate. The Port Authority also owns the World Trade Center site and Port Authority Trans-Hudson, and the PAPD is responsible for the general safety and security of those facilities.

=== Criminal Investigations Bureau ===
The Criminal Investigations Bureau consists of 77 detectives and supervisors that are specifically trained for crimes occurring at transportation facilities. During the past year, the Criminal Investigations Bureau has worked on computerized airline ticket fraud, and property and drug interdictions. They have seized over 10 million dollars of goods including 35 kg (77 lb) of narcotics. Additionally, the Criminal Investigations Bureau has worked cooperatively with Local, State, and Federal agencies in the fight against crime. Some of these agencies include the New Jersey State Police, the New York City Police Department, United States Customs and Border Protection, and the federal Drug Enforcement Administration. Members of the Criminal Investigations Bureau also work as part of the FBI Joint Terrorism Task Force to prevent terrorist activities in the region.

=== Emergency Service Unit ===
PAPD Emergency Service Unit patch

The Port Authority Police Emergency Service Unit was founded in 1983, over the objections of the Port Authority Police management at that time. Working with the non-police PATH railroad personnel and railroad management, who clearly recognized the need for a rapid response to PATH railroad emergencies and fires, a small group of Port Authority Police officers assigned to the PATH command asked for, and got, a stock Port Authority utility truck which was converted for police emergency use. Despite the continued objections of P.A. Police management, the PATH railroad management's goal of having an "Emergency Response Vehicle" operated by the police bore fruit. The initial team members were trained in underground rescue, extrication of passengers from PATH train cars and first aid, with emphasis on the procedure of lifting railroad cars from trapped persons by use of Vetter air bags. Prior to the PATH Emergency Unit, emergencies which occurred on the PATH train were handled by the local police within the jurisdictions around the PATH train (Jersey City, New York, Newark, etc.).

Emergency Service Unit members, who have received specialized training to respond to emergency and rescue operations that arise at Port Authority facilities or in other jurisdictions when their expertise is requested are currently assigned to various facilities throughout the Port Authority. Emergency Service Unit members may receive training in the following areas; animal control, hazardous material response, heavy weapon use, bridge and water rescue and tactical operations. Noteworthy cases that the Emergency Services Unit has handled or assisted other jurisdictions in handling include:

- A 1983 ceiling collapse at the Journal Square Transportation Center
- Water rescues from the PATH system in 1992
- The 1993 World Trade Center bombing
- The rescue of an emotionally disturbed person from a water tower in West New York, New Jersey.
- An NJ Transit train accident in the Hackensack Meadowlands in 1996
- A 1999 General Aviation crash in the City of Newark
- The rescue of homeowners in Bound Brook, N.J., trapped by rising floodwaters caused by Hurricane Floyd in 1999.
- The collapse of the World Trade Center on September 11, 2001

=== Canine Units ===
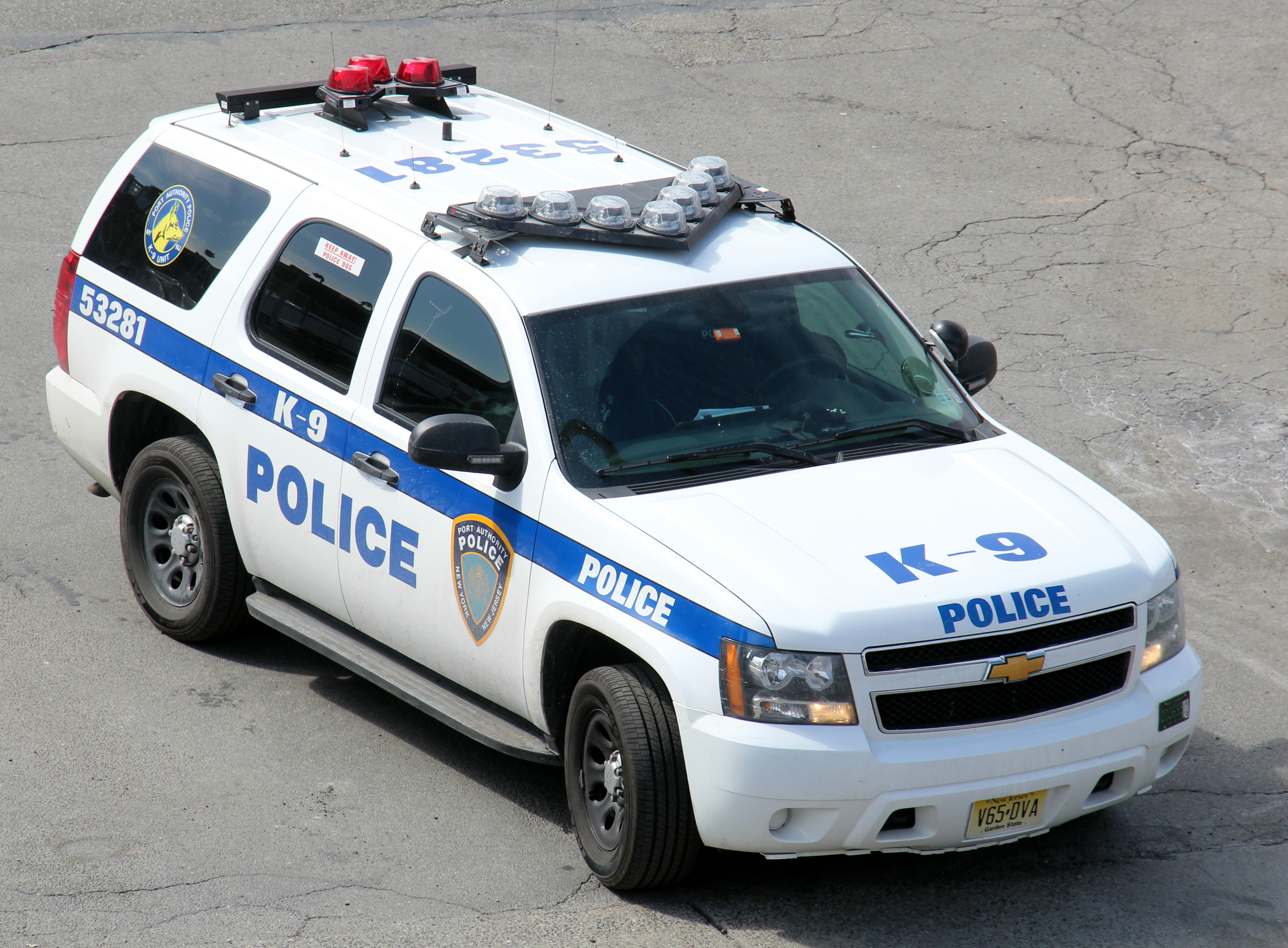
PAPD K-9 Chevrolet Tahoe

The Port Authority Police Department formed its first canine unit with three patrol dogs; Prince, Bear, and Rex, and three police officer handlers in September 1985. There were two assigned to PATH and one assigned to the Port Authority Bus Terminal. They were trained by the NYC Transit Police canine unit located in Brooklyn N.Y. They began patrol in December 1985. The Port Authority Police Department formed its Canine (police dog) Explosive Detection Unit in the fall of 1996 in response to the crash of TWA Flight 800 off the coast of Long Island that summer. The department subsequently expanded the unit to include a K-9 Narcotics Detection Unit.

The Canine unit, which consists of 45 police officers, three sergeants, one inspector, and 48 dogs, patrols all Port Authority facilities on a 24-hour basis.

Port Authority Police officers who are members of the K-9 unit must pass a challenging and demanding physical, a physical agility course, participate in a group interview and complete a minimum of 400 hours of K-9 training. The most popular dog in the unit is the German Shepherd. The unit also has Labradors, a Belgian Shepherd and a Golden Retriever. The dogs are trained to detect either explosives or narcotics, but not both.

The unit currently has 40 dogs trained to detect explosives, including 22 certified by the federal Transportation Security Administration. There are eight dogs trained in narcotics detection.

The canine explosive detection teams patrol and search aircraft, airline and cargo buildings, bus terminals, subway stations, vehicles, and unattended luggage and packages. The K-9 narcotic detection teams patrol and perform a variety of searches at Port Authority facilities and are also used by many other government agencies.

This unit experienced what might be the first loss ever of an American police dog due to international terrorism when Sirius, PAPD Badge #17, died in the collapse of the World Trade Center's South Tower. Sirius' remains were recovered in 2002, and ceremoniously removed with full honors.

=== Youth Services Unit ===
Originally founded in 1972, the Port Authority Police’s Youth Services Unit (YSU) helps youth in or by:

- Responding to situations involving child abuse, rape or harm
- D.O.E. or runaway situations
- Truancy verification

=== Firefighting and Crash Emergency ===
In June 1998, the Port Authority Police Department opened a new aircraft rescue, firefighting, and fuel spill trainer facility at John F. Kennedy International Airport.

The facility, one of the largest of its kind in the United States, is used to train Port Authority Police officers in aircraft rescue and firefighting techniques. It allows officers to train for emergency situations in a controlled environment. The centerpiece of the training center is a 125-foot-diameter (38 m) pit that uses clean-burning propane to simulate a fire. It also features a 75-foot (23 m)-long aircraft mock-up with a broken wing section. Computer controls allow for the creation of firefighting scenarios that vary in size, difficulty and intensity.

Each year, more than 600 Port Authority officers are cross-trained as aircraft rescue firefighters for the region's three major airports - John F. Kennedy International, Newark Liberty International, and LaGuardia airports.

In 2014, the command and responsibility of the Aircraft rescue and firefighting (ARFF) Unit at the major Port Authority airports was transferred from the Port Authority Police Department to Port Authority Aviation Department. This transfer was due to numerous and prolonged deficiencies and violations discovered by the Federal Aviation Administration (FAA). The results of the FAA investigation cited numerous instances where Port Authority Police did not properly maintain training records that are mandated by the FAA. The FAA also discovered numerous instances where Port Authority Police permitted untrained officers to be placed in firefighter positions. Thousands of violations were found to be occurring for many years. A Federal consent order was levied against the Port Authority which mandated numerous changes including creating a full-time cadre of ARFF firefighters; removing command and control of the ARFF unit from the direction of the Port Authority Police Department; and the putting in place non-police ARFF commanding officers. While Port Authority Police officers still make up the rank and file of the ARFF Unit, command and control of the ARFF unit and emergencies is under the direction of a Port Authority Aviation Department fire chief as well as Port Authority Aviation deputy fire chiefs and fire captains assigned to each of the agency's four airports. The Police Academy Deputy Inspector is the commanding officer of the Rescue Training Center at JFK Airport.

=== Aviation Unit ===
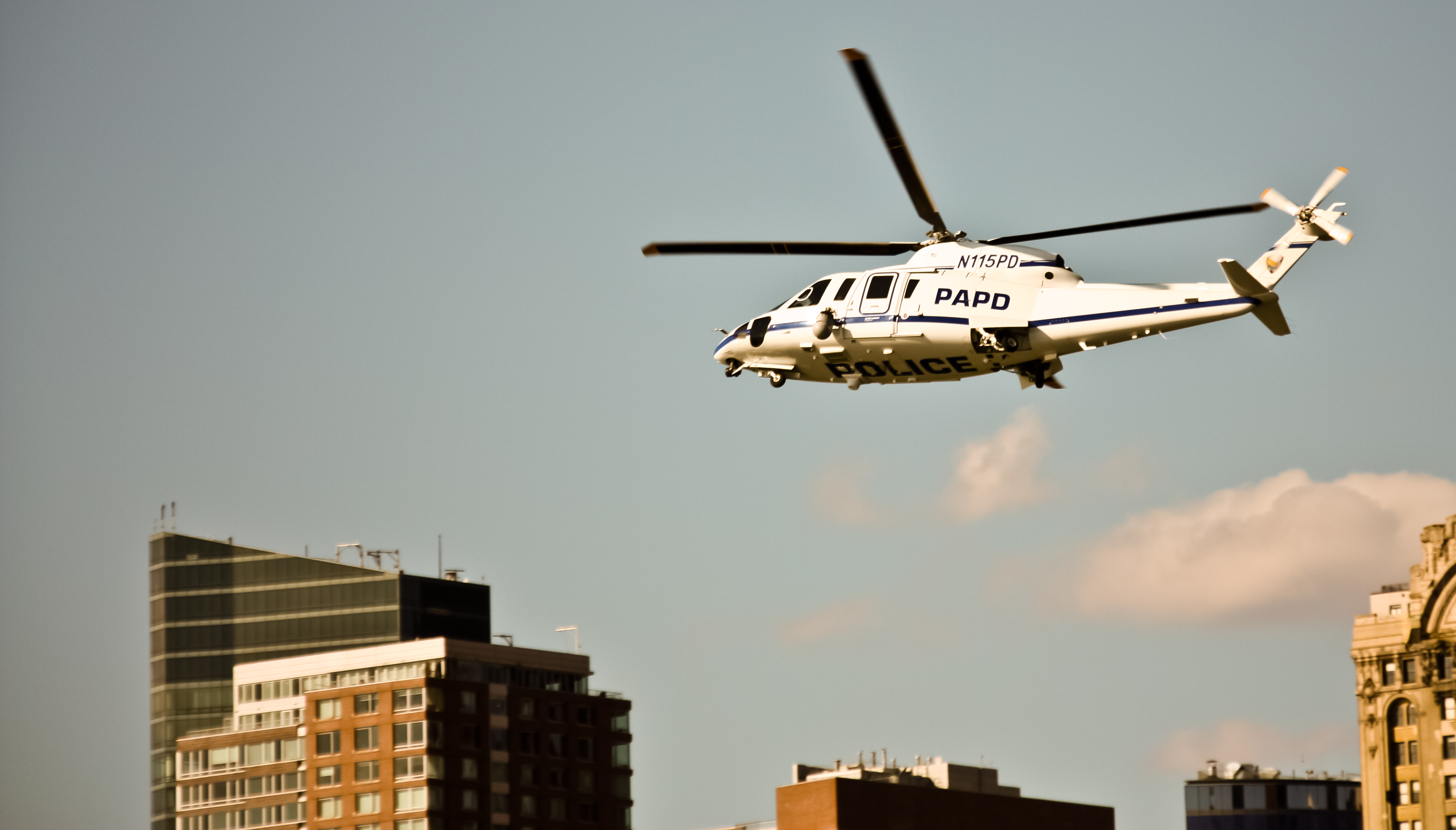
A PAPD S-76 in March 2010

After undertaking a study, the PAPD in July 2010 decided to disband its aviation unit, elimination of which would save an estimated $4 million annually in labor, fuel and maintenance costs. In addition, selling the fleet's two Sikorsky S-76 helicopters was expected to net over $8 million.

During an eight-month review period from August 2008 through April 2009, the helicopters made 258 flights, 228 of which were security patrols of Port Authority-operated airports, bridges, tunnels, and other properties. Not a single unusual incident was spotted during these patrols, according to a Wall Street Journal report. One flight was made in response to the US Airways 1549 "Miracle on the Hudson" incident, but the New York City Police Department waved off the PAPD's assistance. Other flights were made to take aerial photos of facilities. The review also discovered that the Port Authority was the only airport operator in the U.S. to use patrol helicopters.

== Training ==
Recruits typically receive 26 weeks of intensive training at the Port Authority Police Academy, which is located in Jersey City, NJ, with a Regional Training Center located at Kennedy Airport. Training given to recruits includes New York and New Jersey law, behavioral sciences, public relations, police practices and procedures, laws of arrest, court procedures and testimony. They are also trained in rules of evidence, defensive tactics, first aid, fire fighting, police patrol and traffic duty, firearms training, defensive and pursuit driving, water safety and rescue. Throughout their careers, Port Authority Police officers return to the academy both for refresher courses and for training in new techniques added to the curriculum.

The Koebel Memorial Police Firearms Training Center is dedicated to the memory of Police Officer Henry J. Koebel, who was killed in the line of duty in May 1978. The Police Academy uses state-of-the-art equipment where the staff operates eighteen shooting ports within this computerized firearms training facility. Features include moveable target lights and noise controls, shoot/do not shoot situations, as well as standard marksmanship instruction.

In June 2016, the PAPD began delivering counter-terrorism training focused on "active shooter situations" to key personnel. The program was paid for by federal grants. That month, the PAPD added 102 new recruits to its ranks of roughly 1,800 officers. The PAPD focuses on intelligence gathering to protect against attacks. It is a member of 28 different task forces at the federal, state and local level, including the FBI Joint Terrorism Task Force.

== Rank structure ==
Overseen by a non-uniformed Superintendent of Police/Director of Public Safety, there are ten sworn titles (commonly referred to as ranks) in the Port Authority Police Department in the following order:

Title (Rank)	Insignia	Uniform Shirt Color
Chief of Police Operations		White
Assistant Chief		White
Deputy Chief		White
Inspector		White
Deputy Inspector		White
Captain		White
Detective Lieutenant or Lieutenant		White
Detective Sergeant or Sergeant		Dark Blue
Detective or Police Officer		Dark Blue

Promotions to the rank of sergeant, lieutenant and higher are made via examinations, including a qualifications review meeting interview. Promotion to detective and Captain and above is at the discretion of the Superintendent of Police/Director, Public Safety Department.

== Power and authority ==
Port Authority Police officers are classified as police officers in New Jersey and as New York State police officers under paragraph e, subdivision of the state Criminal Procedure Law. With the status of police officer, they are permitted to serve warrants, make arrests, use physical and deadly force, carry and use firearms, carry and use handcuffs, and issue summonses. Port Authority Police officers have jurisdiction in a 35-mile radius from the Statue of Liberty.

== Equipment and vehicles ==
A Ford F-550 with a custom upfit for the Emergency Service Unit of the PAPD

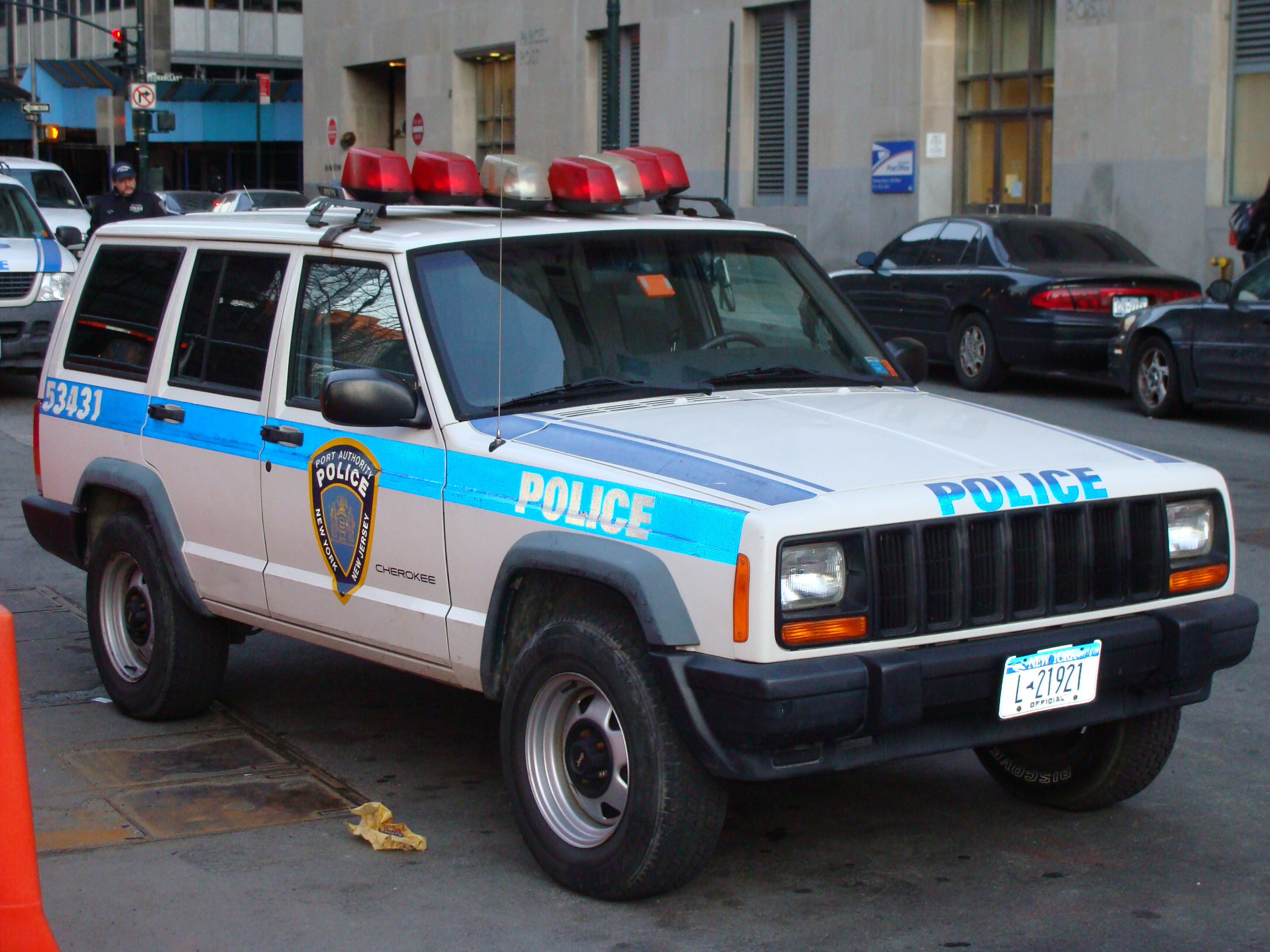
PAPD Jeep Cherokee near the World Trade Center in 2009

A new Ford Police Interceptor Utility parked at Journal Square’s Terminal A in 2026

All Port Authority Police officers are equipped with a Glock 19 9mm handgun as their service pistol, expandable baton, can of pepper spray, handcuffs, whistle, flashlight, bullet resistant vest, and a radio that is directly linked to the Central Dispatcher and other Port Authority officers.

All Port Authority Police vehicles are painted in a solid white color, with a blue stripe painted horizontally from the shoulder line and beltline of the side view. Large blue sans-serif letters making the word "POLICE" are placed centrally on the front and rear side doors. Secondary white "POLICE" letters (possibly in Helvetica Condensed Extra Bold) are incorporated in the blue horizontal stripe near the front wheel well. The agency emblem is placed on the front doors. It is a shield-shaped logo of the Port Authority Police Department that bears the agency name and mentions New York and New Jersey.

For unit identification, the unit's own fleet number (e.g., 52889) is painted in white numbers in the blue stripe over the rear quarter panel and in blue text in the upper-left part of the rear tailgate.

For the front and rear markings, white "POLICE" letters are centrally located at the front of the hood while the blue horizontal stripe continues to the rear and goes beneath the rear windshield. Standard agency decals are placed in the bottom part of the tailgate.

Currently, the department utilizes numerous vehicles in its fleet including Ford Police Interceptor Utilitys, Chevrolet Impalas, Chevrolet Tahoes, Dodge Chargers, and Harley Davidson motorcycles. The department also utilizes numerous boats. At the airports the Port Authority utilizes a number of aircraft rescue fire fighting vehicles, known as "crash trucks".

== Deaths in the line of duty ==
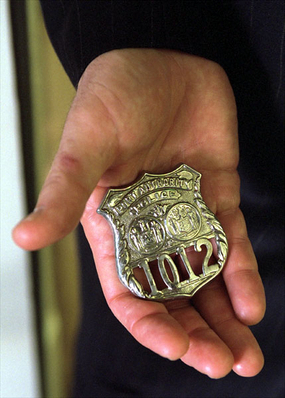
Badge 1012 was worn by Police Officer George Howard who died in the collapse of the WTC on 9/11.

The PAPD has had 50 police officers die in the line of duty. The Port Authority Police Department suffered one of the worst losses of life ever in a single event in the history of policing in the United States, losing 37 officers in the 9/11 attacks. PAPD officers killed ranged from rookie patrolmen to the Chief of the Department.

Officer's Name	End Of Watch	Cause Of Death
Patrolman Charles Kessler	Sunday, December 16, 1951	Accident
Police Officer James Calandra	Monday, November 19, 1956	Motorcycle Accident
Police Officer Hitler M. Mcleod	Friday, November 3, 1961	Gunfire
Police Officer Bertram Winkler	Tuesday, March 21, 1972	Heart Attack
Police Officer Arthur M. Ansert	Monday, October 8, 1973	Vehicular Assault
Police Officer Henry J. Koebel	Friday, May 26, 1978	Gunfire
Police Officer William J. Perry	Monday, December 22, 1980	Gunfire
Police Officer Scott R. Parker	Monday, September 5, 1983	Gunfire
Police Officer David P. Lemagne	Tuesday, September 11, 2001	Terrorist Attack
Chief James Romito	Tuesday, September 11, 2001	Terrorist Attack
Police Officer Richard Rodriguez	Tuesday, September 11, 2001	Terrorist Attack
Captain Kathy Mazza	Tuesday, September 11, 2001	Terrorist Attack
Police Officer Liam Callahan	Tuesday, September 11, 2001	Terrorist Attack
Police Officer James Lynch	Tuesday, September 11, 2001	Terrorist Attack
Director Of Public Safety Fred V. Morrone	Tuesday, September 11, 2001	Terrorist Attack
Police Officer James Nelson	Tuesday, September 11, 2001	Terrorist Attack
Police Officer Uhuru Gonja Houston	Tuesday, September 11, 2001	Terrorist Attack
Police Officer Clinton Davis	Tuesday, September 11, 2001	Terrorist Attack
Police Officer Alfonse Niedermeyer	Tuesday, September 11, 2001	Terrorist Attack
Police Officer Paul Laszczynski	Tuesday, September 11, 2001	Terrorist Attack
Police Officer Nathaniel Webb	Tuesday, September 11, 2001	Terrorist Attack
Police Officer John Lennon	Tuesday, September 11, 2001	Terrorist Attack
Police Officer George Howard	Tuesday, September 11, 2001	Terrorist Attack
Police Officer Michael Wholey	Tuesday, September 11, 2001	Terrorist Attack
Inspector Anthony Infante	Tuesday, September 11, 2001	Terrorist Attack
Lieutenant Robert Cirri	Tuesday, September 11, 2001	Terrorist Attack
Police Officer Kenneth Tietjen	Tuesday, September 11, 2001	Terrorist Attack
Police Officer John Levi	Tuesday, September 11, 2001	Terrorist Attack
Police Officer Thomas Gorman	Tuesday, September 11, 2001	Terrorist Attack
Police Officer Dominick Pezzulo	Tuesday, September 11, 2001	Terrorist Attack
Police Officer Antonio Rodrigues	Tuesday, September 11, 2001	Terrorist Attack
Sergeant Robert Kaulfers	Tuesday, September 11, 2001	Terrorist Attack
Police Officer Donald McIntyre	Tuesday, September 11, 2001	Terrorist Attack
Police Officer Donald Foreman	Tuesday, September 11, 2001	Terrorist Attack
Police Officer Christopher Amoroso	Tuesday, September 11, 2001	Terrorist Attack
Police Officer Walter McNeil	Tuesday, September 11, 2001	Terrorist Attack
Police Officer Maurice Barry	Tuesday, September 11, 2001	Terrorist Attack
Police Officer Joseph Navas	Tuesday, September 11, 2001	Terrorist Attack
Police Officer James Parham	Tuesday, September 11, 2001	Terrorist Attack
Police Officer Walwyn Stuart	Tuesday, September 11, 2001	Terrorist Attack
Police Officer Bruce Reynolds	Tuesday, September 11, 2001	Terrorist Attack
Police Officer John Skala	Tuesday, September 11, 2001	Terrorist Attack
Police Officer Gregg Froehner	Tuesday, September 11, 2001	Terrorist Attack
Police Officer Stephen Huczko Jr.	Tuesday, September 11, 2001	Terrorist Attack
Police Officer Paul Jurgens	Tuesday, September 11, 2001	Terrorist Attack
K9 Sirius	Tuesday, September 11, 2001	Terrorist Attack
Police Officer John Mark Cortazzo	Saturday, March 14, 2009	9/11-related illness
Police Officer Steven Tursellino	Friday, March 13, 2013	9/11-related illness
Sergeant Lawrence Guarnieri	Tuesday, November 4, 2014	9/11-related illness
Lieutenant John J. Brant	Thursday, July 19, 2018	9/11-related illness
Police Officer William James Leahy	Thursday, June 6, 2019	
Lieutenant Robert Jones	Saturday, June 15, 2019	Duty related illness

== Terrorist attacks ==
=== World Trade Center bombing ===
On February 26, 1993, the Port Authority's World Trade Center complex was the target of a terrorist attack bombing. PAPD personnel stationed at the complex provided an immediate response to the terrorist bombing and assisted other responding agencies in evacuating people from the power-stricken complex, many of whom required additional medical assistance as a result of breathing in acrid, sulfurous smoke that had spread from the burning subterranean bomb site at the B-2 level parking garage to the upper floors of the Twin Towers via connecting elevator shafts and stairwells.

=== September 11 attacks ===
September 11, 2001, witnessed the complex as the target of terrorist attacks for a second time. On a normal business day the complex housed over 50,000 employees and accommodated 70,000 visitors; the rescue and evacuation efforts of the Port Authority Police, the New York City Police Department (NYPD), the Fire Department of the City of New York (FDNY), New York City Sheriff's Office, New York State Court Officers, and federal law enforcement officers, along with countless other uniformed and civilian first responders, helped to greatly minimize the loss of life resulting from the plane strikes and subsequent building collapse events. The Port Authority Police suffered the worst loss of police personnel in a single event in American history: 37 police officers, along with one police K-9 named Sirius, were killed at the World Trade Center complex on September 11.

== See also ==
- List of law enforcement agencies in New Jersey
- List of law enforcement agencies in New York
- Metropolitan Transportation Authority Police
- New Jersey Transit Police Department
- Newark Police Department
- New York City Police Department
- Port Authority of New York and New Jersey
