= Health effects arising from the September 11 attacks =

Health issues and effects during and after the September 11 attacks

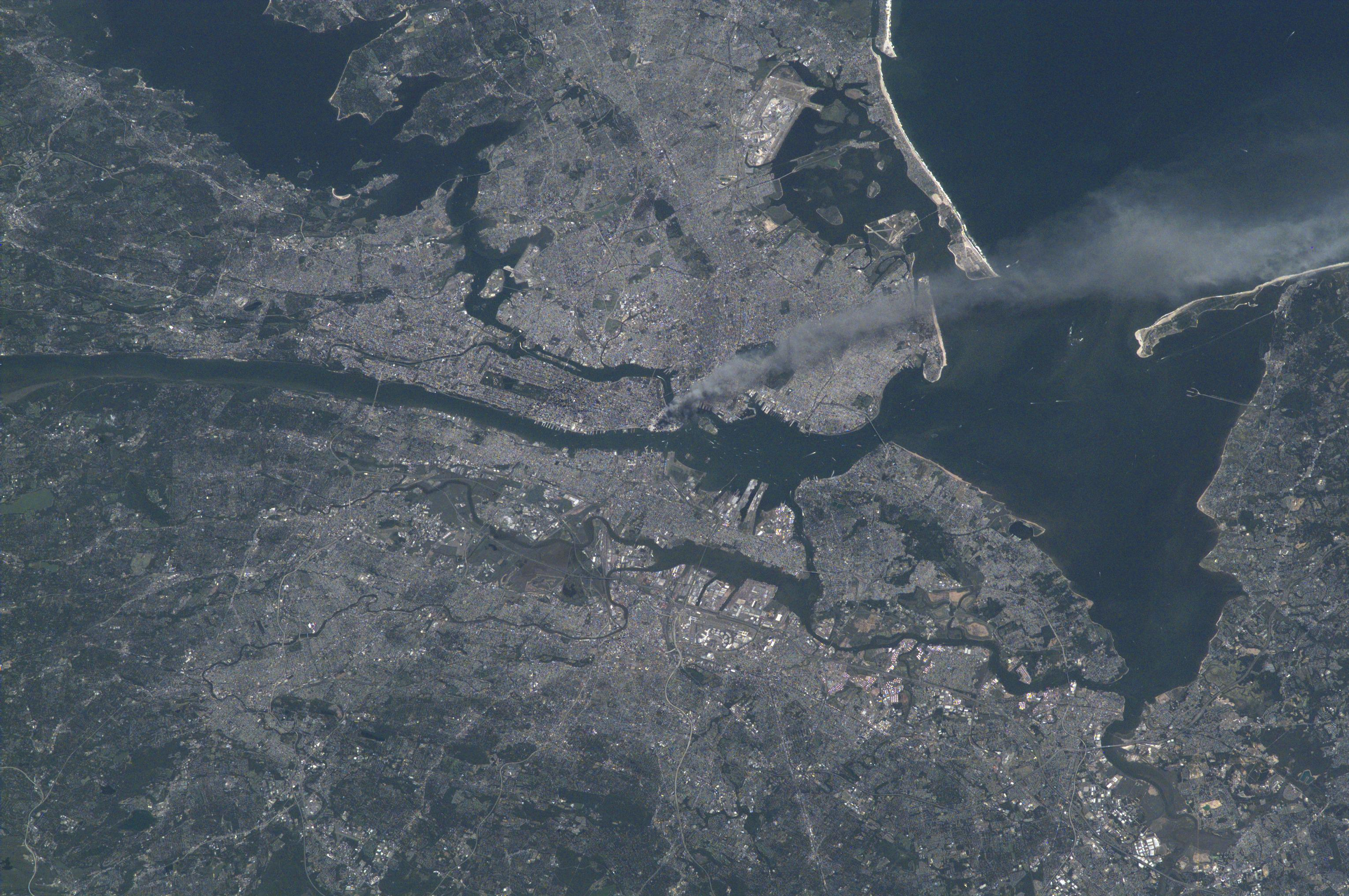
International Space Station image taken on September 11, 2001, with the smoke plume rising from Lower Manhattan and extending over Brooklyn (Expedition 3 crew)

Within seconds of the collapse of the World Trade Center in the September 11 attacks, building materials, electronic equipment, and furniture were pulverized and spread over the area of the Financial District of Lower Manhattan. In the five months following the attacks, dust from the destroyed buildings continued to fill the air of the World Trade Center site. Many New York residents have reported symptoms of Ground Zero–related respiratory illnesses.

Various health programs have arisen to deal with the ongoing health effects of the September 11 attacks. The World Trade Center Health Program, which provides testing and treatment to 9/11 responders and survivors, consolidated many of these after the James Zadroga 9/11 Health and Compensation Act became law in January 2011.

More people have died from illnesses caused by 9/11 than during the attack itself. As of 2023, it is estimated that over 5,000 people have died from medical complications related to the attacks, specifically those enrolled in the World Trade Center Health Program by the Centers for Disease Control and Prevention.

== Exposures and conditions ==
As of December 2017, the most common conditions certified by the World Trade Center Health Program were rhinosinusitis, gastroesophageal reflux disease (GERD), asthma, sleep apnea, cancer, post-traumatic stress disorder, respiratory disease, chronic obstructive pulmonary disease, depression, and anxiety disorder. The most common cancers were skin cancer and prostate cancer. The World Trade Center Health Program regularly publishes the most commonly certified condition on its website.

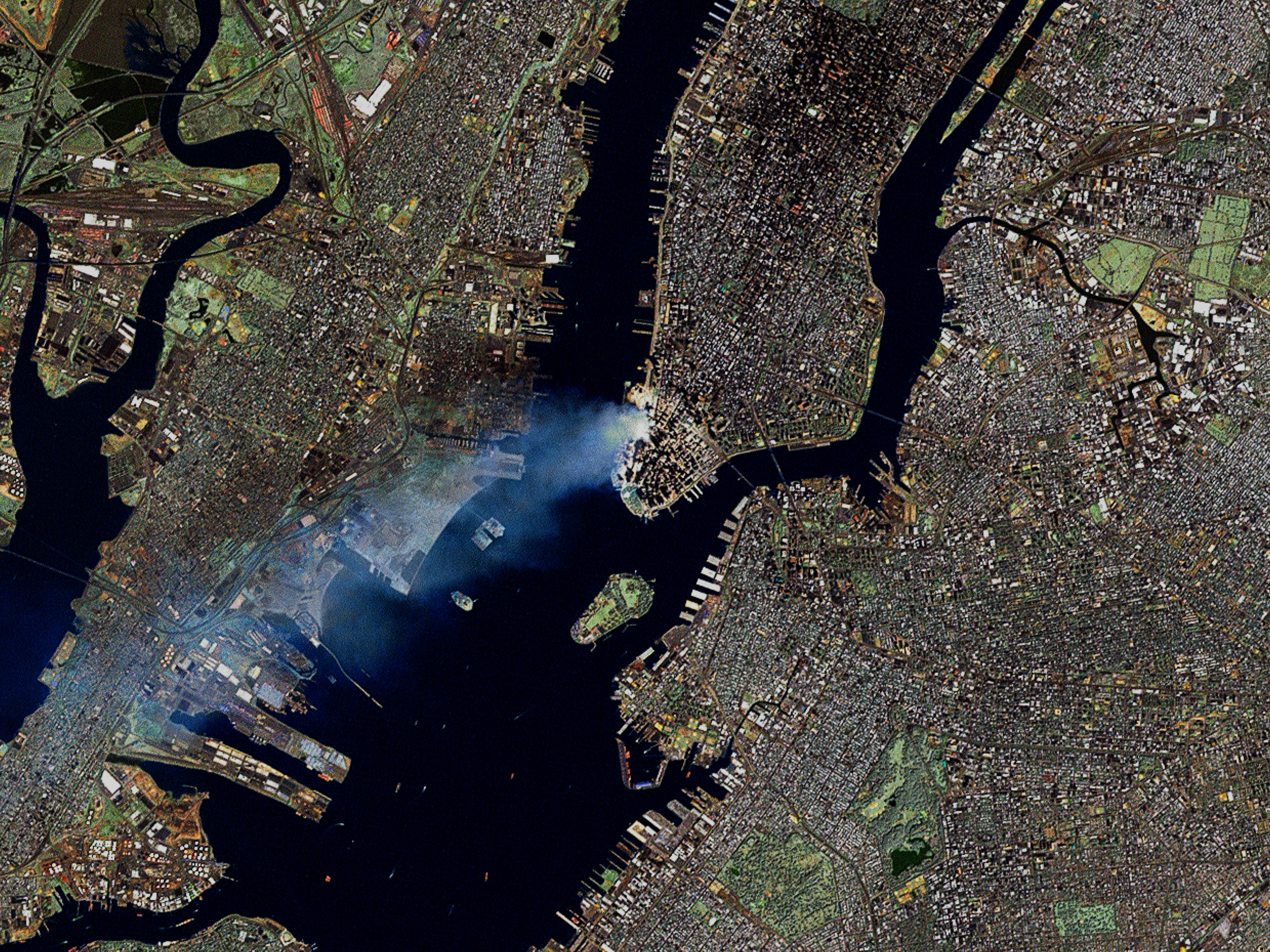
September 12 from space: Manhattan spreads a large smoke plume

=== Toxic dust ===
A video on airway injury in patients exposed to WTC dust

The dust from the collapsed towers was "wildly toxic", according to air pollution expert and University of California, Davis Professor Emeritus Thomas Cahill. Much of the thousands of tons of debris resulting from the collapse of the Twin Towers was pulverized concrete, which is known to cause silicosis upon inhalation. The remainder consisted of more than 2,500 contaminants, more specifically: 50% non-fibrous material and construction debris; 40% glass and other fibers; 9.2% cellulose; and 0.8% of the extremely toxic carcinogen asbestos, as well as detectable amounts of lead and mercury. There were also unprecedented levels of dioxins and polycyclic aromatic hydrocarbons (PAHs) from the fires which burned for three months. Many of the dispersed substances (asbestos, crystalline silica, lead, cadmium, and polycyclic aromatic hydrocarbons) are carcinogenic; other substances can trigger kidney, heart, liver and nervous system deterioration. This was well known by the EPA at the time of collapse. A case report funded by the National Institute for Occupational Safety and Health (NIOSH) and performed by Mount Sinai School of Medicine observed carbon nanotubes in dust samples and in the lungs of several 9/11 responders.

The composition of the smoke and dust in the air was not fully understood at the time; the World Trade Center Health Program's Dr. Michael Crane touched upon this issue in an interview with Newsweek stating:

We will never know the composition of that cloud, because the wind carried it away, but people were breathing and eating it...What we do know is that it had all kinds of god-awful things in it. Burning jet fuel. Plastics, metal, fiberglass, asbestos. It was thick, terrible stuff. A witch’s brew.

— World Trade Center Health Program's Dr. Michael Crane, Newsweek interview

These toxic exposures have led to debilitating illnesses among rescue, recovery, and cleanup workers, and the pulmonary fibrosis death of NYPD member Cesar Borja. Increasing numbers of cases are appearing in which first responders are developing serious respiratory ailments. Health effects also extended to some residents, students, and office workers of Lower Manhattan and nearby Chinatown.

Dr. Edwin M. Kilbourne, a high level federal scientist, issued a memo on September 12, 2001, to the Centers for Disease Control and Prevention advising against the speedy return to buildings in the area because of possible hazards from various toxic materials.

On October 6, 2001, Associate City Health Commissioner Kelly McKinney said that proper safety protocol for WTC site workers was not being enforced.

In September 2026, New York City released approximately 170,000 pages of previously undisclosed records concerning air quality, health concerns, and the city's response to the September 11 attacks. The records included the "Harding Memo", which addressed potential litigation related to exposure to hazardous substances at the World Trade Center site and the lack of adequate protective equipment. The release followed a legal battle with 9/11 Health Watch over access to the records.

Environmental measurements documenting asbestos and other contaminants in Lower Manhattan following the attacks. Some records showed contaminant levels exceeding applicable limits while others documented continued asbestos contamination months after the attacks.

A study of 5,000 rescue workers published in April 2010 by Dr. David J. Prezant – the chief medical officer for the Office of Medical Affairs at the New York City Fire Department – found that all the workers studied had impaired lung functions, with an average impairment of 10 percent. The study found that firefighters who arrived on the Sept. 11 morning had the worst impairments, which presented themselves within the first year after the attack, with little or no improvements in the ensuing six years. 30% to 40% of workers were reporting persistent symptoms and 1000 of the group studied were on "permanent respiratory disability". A 2006 study has discovered that first responders were losing 12 years of lung capacity. The World Trade Center Health Program certified such conditions as rhinosinusitis, asthma, GERD, COPD, and cancer. Dr. Prezant noted that medication given to the victims can ease but not cure the symptoms. Dr. Byron Thomashow, medical director of the Center for Chest Disease and Respiratory Failure at New York – Presbyterian/Columbia hospital, said that "The drop-off in lung function initially is really quite significant and doesn't get better. That's not what we've generally come to expect in people with fire and smoke exposure. They usually recover."

=== Cancer risk ===
A video on the three types of cancer found to increase in WTC exposed populations

A study published in December 2012 in The Journal of the American Medical Association observed the possible association between exposure to the World Trade Center debris and excess cancer risk. Over 55,000 individuals enrolled in the World Trade Center Health Registry, separated by rescue and/or recovery workers and non-rescue and/or recovery workers, were observed from 2003 or 2004 to December 31, 2008. The findings showed the overall incidence of all cancers among rescue and/or recovery workers was not significantly elevated, compared to non-rescue and/or recovery workers. Despite this, the incidences for prostate cancer, thyroid cancer and multiple myeloma were significantly elevated among the rescue and/or recovery workers in the final year of observation. There were higher rates of cancer in the firefighters exposed to the WTC than in the general population of male individuals in the United States in 2001-2016, with major adjustments observed in melanoma, thyroid cancer and non-Hodgkin lymphoma. The highest number of cancer cases and cancer deaths recorded under the WTC Health Program have reached 8,215 and 143, respectively.

On November 28, 2006, the Village Voice reported that several dozen recovery personnel have developed cancer – as opposed to having contracted respiratory ailments, and that doctors have argued that some of these cancers developed as a result of the exposure to toxins at the Ground Zero site: "To date, 75 recovery workers at ground zero have been diagnosed with blood cell cancers that a half-dozen top doctors and epidemiologists have confirmed as having been likely caused by that exposure."

On September 11, 2018, 17 years after the attacks, a New York City law firm reported that at least 15 men were diagnosed with male breast cancer in the intervening years due to the attacks.

On September 7, 2025, the New York Post reported the number of people diagnosed with cancer increased by 143% in five years to 48,579, including 8,215 deaths, according to the World Trade Center Health Program.

Through the September 11th Victim Compensation Fund (VCF), individuals who had been diagnosed with cancer as a result of their physical exposure to the toxins in the World Trade Center blast zone or the surrounding New York City area between September 11, 2001, and May 30, 2002, were able to receive financial compensation for the collateral damage they personally suffered because of the attack. Through free legal guidance, affected individuals could clarify their specific eligibility for the VCF, while receiving the necessary logistic aid in order to fulfill a compensation claim by the July 29, 2021 cut-off date for "timely" applications.

=== Psychological effects ===
A video on the risk of developing post-traumatic stress disorder as a result of 9/11 exposures

A study published two months after 9/11 found that Americans across the country experienced substantial symptoms of stress after the attacks. Two subsequent studies found that exposure to the attacks was a predictor of the development of PTSD. Additional studies also looked at the psychological effects of those who lost a family member or friend in the attacks, or viewed the attacks on television.. Among higher exposure rates of chronic mental illness, PTSD, depression and anxiety were significantly higher ten years following the attacks. Even seven to nine years post-attack, the rescue and recovery personnel were still left with a range of comorbid conditions and had to be provided with a multidisciplinary way of treatment. Measures have been suggested to diagnose the population affected to heal in the long-term as the psychosocial resilience community level is understood.

=== Reactions ===
Dr. Larry Norton of Memorial Sloan-Kettering Hospital asked, "Why isn't the whole nation mobilizing to take care of the chronic health impact of this disaster?" Dr. Norton cited the 70 percent illness rate among first responders as "a wake up call." Dr. Nathaniel Hupert of Weill Cornell Medical College, quoted by Jill Gardiner of the October 4, 2006, issue of the New York Sun said that premature deaths and other ailments of dogs in the area are "our canary in the coalmine."

A number of professors and researchers have argued that the cancer incidence among monitored individuals cannot be called a coincidence. They include Richard Clapp and David Ozonoff, professors of environmental health at Boston University School of Public Health, Michael Thun, director of epidemiological research at the American Cancer Society, Francine Laden, assistant professor of environmental epidemiology at Harvard School of Public Health, Jonathan Samet, chairman of the epidemiology department at Johns Hopkins Bloomberg School of Public Health, and Charles Hesdorffer, associate professor of oncology at Johns Hopkins School of Medicine. They assert that the Ground Zero cloud was likely the cause of the illnesses. The American College of Preventative Medicine is concerned that malignant mesothelioma will develop among persons exposed to Ground Zero air.

== Monitoring and compensation ==
About 400,000 people that were directly affected by the attack are eligible to be enrolled in the World Trade Center Health Registry, and can be referred to the World Trade Center Health Program, which provides free monitoring and health care to those enrolled.

There is scientific speculation that exposure to various toxic products and the pollutants in the air surrounding the Towers after the WTC collapse may have negative effects on fetal development. Due to this potential hazard, a notable children's environmental health center (Columbia University Center for Children's Health) is currently analyzing the children whose mothers were pregnant during the WTC collapse, and were living or working near the World Trade Center towers. The staff of this study assesses the children using psychological testing every year and interviews the mothers every six months. The purpose of the study is to determine whether there is significant difference in development and health progression of children whose mothers were exposed, versus those who were not exposed after the WTC collapse.

Mount Sinai Medical Center is conducting an ongoing monitoring program, World Trade Center Worker and Volunteer Medical Screening Program. A leader of Mt. Sinai monitoring efforts is Stephen M. Levin, Medical Director of the Mount Sinai – Irving J. Selikoff Center for Occupational and Environmental Medicine. First responders met in a conference, November 11, 2006, in an effort to monitor responders' health. The event was organized by the World Trade Center Monitoring Program.

An ongoing Pennsylvania State University/Monmouth University study reported that respiratory illnesses grew by more than two hundred percent in the year and a half after the September 11 attacks. (This was the first study that monitored police officers at the Ground Zero site. It was published in the "Journal of Occupational and Environmental Medicine.") In this study of 471 police officers, 19 percent of the officers in October 2001 experienced shortness of breath; 44 percent of the officers experienced shortness of breath in April 2003. The percentage of the 471 officers coughing up phlegm increased from 14 percent in October 2001 to 31 percent in 2003.

A 2006 medical study of fire fighters reported that those personnel who inhaled Ground Zero air essentially lost 12 years of lung function. Additionally, a Mount Sinai report found that 70 percent of recovery and rescue workers reported an increase in debilitated respiratory function between 2002 and 2004. A 2008 report by New York City's Department of Health indicated that up to 70,000 people might have stress disorder due to the attack. The findings were the result of the city's health registry of September 11 first responders, residents, and others.

=== Compensation ===
Apparently, out of at least 100,000 eligible, fewer than 14,000 have registered, as reported by the National Council for Occupational Safety and Health. The final registration deadline for September 11–related workers' compensation was August 14, 2007.

On July 12, 2007, Governor Eliot Spitzer extended to August 14, 2008, the filing deadline for worker's compensation claims, for people who worked or volunteered at Ground Zero. Individuals would register with the State Workers' Compensation Board. In 2019 New York Governor Andrew Cuomo granted a third extension for Ground Zero rescue, recovery or clean up workers to file a notice of participation for worker' compensation benefits. This applies to workers who had not yet filled or who were denied between September 2015 and September 2017, with the new deadline being September 11, 2022.

In April 2022 a bill was introduced in the New York State Legislature, and was referred to the Committee on Governmental Employees. The bill aimed to provide coverage for any illness or death incurred due to the individuals participation in rescue, recovery and cleanup operations related to the attacks. Additionally, the Centers for Disease Control and Prevention World Trade Center Health Program Certification would be deemed presumptive medical evidence of a causally related diagnosis under workers compensation law.

== Vulnerable individuals ==
In 2008, the lead researcher of a New York State Department of Health study informed The New York Post of a study documenting at least 204 deaths of rescue and recovery workers since September 11, 2001. The researchers for the study confirmed 98 deaths with death certificates. The researchers showed that 77 persons died of illnesses, including 55 from lung and various other cancers. Kitty Gelberg, New York state Bureau of Occupational Health's chief epidemiologist said, "We're not saying they are all World Trade Center related; we're just saying this is what people are dying from." Many of the 55 responders who died from cancer had cancer before September 11, 2001, but most of the cancer patients developed the disease afterward.

The 98 deaths up to 2008 included:

- 55 cancers
- 21 traumatic injuries (motor-vehicle crashes, gunshots and five homicides, including four cops killed in the line of duty)
- 12 heart disease, including 10 heart attacks
- 2 sarcoidosis
- 1 polyneuropathy (neurological disorder)
- 1 pneumonia
- 1 granuloma pneumonitis
- 1 alcoholism
- 1 amyloidosis (bone marrow disorder)
- 1 kidney disease

=== First responders ===
Many first responders who reported to Ground Zero and later assisted in rescue and recovery have claimed that they are victims of diseases associated with the toxic cloud from the pulverized buildings and equipment. NYPD Detective James Zadroga, 34, was the first 9/11 responder whose death was directly linked with toxic Ground Zero substances. Gerard Breton, a pathologist of the Ocean County, New Jersey, medical examiner's office (which conducted an autopsy), reported "with a reasonable degree of medical certainty that the cause of death in this case was directly related to the 9/11 incident."

In 2017, 24 members of the NYPD died of cancer linked to toxins from the terrorist attack. In the first five months of 2018, another 24 members of the NYPD died of the same cause.

In 2020, the NYPD confirmed that 247 NYPD police officers had died due to 9/11-related illnesses. In September 2022, the FDNY confirmed that the total number of firefighters that died due to 9/11-related illnesses was 299. Both agencies believed that the death toll would rise dramatically in the coming years. The Port Authority of New York and New Jersey Police Department (PAPD), which is the law enforcement agency which has jurisdiction over the World Trade Center due to the Port Authority of New York and New Jersey owning the site, has confirmed that four of its police officers have died of 9/11-related illnesses. The chief of the PAPD at the time, Joseph Morris, made sure that industrial-grade respirators were provided to all PAPD police officers within 48 hours and decided that the same 30 to 40 police officers would be stationed at the World Trade Center pile, drastically lowering the number of total PAPD personnel who would be exposed to the air. The FDNY and NYPD had rotated hundreds, if not thousands, of different personnel from all over New York City to the pile which exposed so many of them to dust that would give them cancer or other diseases years or decades later. Also, they weren't given adequate respirators and breathing equipment that could have prevented future diseases.

==== Examples of health issues ====
Cesar Borja, a veteran of the NYPD, died, falling ill from lung disease. He had spent 16-hour days at the smoldering wreckage of Ground Zero. Detective Robert Williamson, 46, died from pancreatic and lung cancer on May 13, 2007. He worked for 16-hour days, without taking days off, in performing recovery work at the Ground Zero site. After the clean up effort, he was among individuals that lobbied Governor George Pataki to sign a bill permitting retirees suffering from Ground Zero illnesses to have their illnesses reclassified and to receive additional pension benefits. His family and union believe that his cancers were directly caused by exposure to Ground Zero dust at the World Trade Center site. Twenty year veteran of the NYPD, Officer Kevin Hawkins, 41, died in May 2007 from kidney cancer, soon after filing for a Ground Zero disability pension. He had worked two months at the Ground Zero site.

On September 3, 2007, NYPD Officer Frank Macri died of lung cancer that spread throughout his body, including to his spine. Macri's lungs were filled with dust when the towers collapsed and he later spent two months working on the site. The long hours on the site gave him vomiting spells and he was diagnosed with an already rapidly progressing stage four cancer only one year after the attack, despite being a non-smoker and cancer free before the attacks. In 2011, a lower court ruled that 9/11 toxins were the likely cause of Macri's death. In 2012, the New York Supreme Court ruled that Macri's widow is entitled to line-of-duty death benefits of his full salary. On December 12, 2017, NYPD Captain Douglas Greenwood took his own life after a suffering from long-term lung disease, brought on by deadly chemicals in the air while working alongside other officers at Ground Zero. The pain he suffered over the years became too much to manage, causing him to take his own life by shooting himself in the chest near his home in Suffolk County, New York.

===== General list of deceased due to health effects =====
| Name | Rank or role | Organisation | Date of death | Ref. |
|---|---|---|---|---|
| Felicia Dunn-Jones | Attorney | | February 10, 2002 | |
| Thomas F. Weiner Jr. | Detective | New York City Police Department | May 3, 2003 | |
| William B. Titus Jr. | Detective | New York City Police Department | August 24, 2003 | |
| Edward M. Ferraro | Officer | New York City Police Department | June 6, 2004 | |
| James J. Godbee | Officer | New York City Police Department | December 30, 2004 | |
| Thomas G. Brophy | Officer | New York City Police Department | April 21, 2005 | |
| Ronald E. Weintraub | Officer | New York City Police Department | November 16, 2005 | |
| James Zadroga | Detective | New York City Police Department | January 5, 2006 | |
| Sandra Y. Adrian | Detective | New York City Police Department | January 11, 2006 | |
| Edward C. Gilpin | Captain | New York City Police Department | September 7, 2006 | |
| Daniel C. Conroy | Officer | New York City Police Department | December 3, 2006 | |
| Cesar Borja | Officer | New York City Police Department | January 23, 2007 | |
| Louise M. Johnston | Officer | New York City Police Department | March 6, 2007 | |
| Kevin Hawkins | Detective | New York City Police Department | May 7, 2007 | |
| Robert Williamson | Detective | New York City Police Department | May 13, 2007 | |
| Madeline Carlo | Officer | New York City Police Department | July 15, 2007 | |
| Robert B. Helmke | Officer | New York City Police Department | July 28, 2007 | |
| Claire T. Hanrahan | Sergeant | New York City Police Department | August 28, 2007 | |
| Frank Macri | Officer | New York City Police Department | September 3, 2007 | |
| William J. Holfester | Detective | New York City Police Department | January 22, 2008 | |
| John E. Goggin | Detective | New York City Police Department | May 6, 2008 | |
| Gary Mausberg | Officer | New York City Police Department | October 8, 2008 | |
| Alex W. Baez | Sergeant | New York City Police Department | November 22, 2008 | |
| Vito Mauro | Officer | New York City Police Department | December 2, 2008 | |
| Richard Jakubowsky | Officer | New York City Police Department | June 7, 2009 | |
| Renee Dunbar | Officer | New York City Police Department | August 25, 2009 | |
| Donald G. Feser | Inspector | New York City Police Department | September 12, 2009 | |
| Corey J. Diaz | Detective | New York City Police Department | October 7, 2009 | |
| Robert C. Grossman | Officer | New York City Police Department | October 9, 2009 | |
| Charles J. Clark | Sergeant | New York City Police Department | November 7, 2009 | |
| Frank M. Bolusi | Officer | New York City Police Department | January 12, 2010 | |
| Alan Hechtman | EMT | Wantagh-Levittown Volunteer Ambulance Corps | May 11, 2010 | |
| David Mahmoud | Officer | New York City Police Department | November 11, 2010 | |
| Robert M. Ehmer | Officer | New York City Police Department | November 21, 2010 | |
| Kevin A. Czartoryski | Detective | New York City Police Department | December 5, 2010 | |
| Barry Galfano | Captain | New York City Police Department | June 26, 2011 | |
| Karen E. Barnes | Officer | New York City Police Department | August 4, 2011 | |
| Charles D. Cole Jr. | Officer | Nassau County Police Department | August 14, 2011 | |
| Alick W. Herrmann | Detective | New York City Police Department | December 23, 2011 | |
| Richard G. Holland | Officer | New York City Police Department | March 23, 2012 | |
| Garrett Danza | Sergeant | New York City Police Department | July 11, 2012 | |
| Ronald G. Becker Jr. | Officer | New York City Police Department | August 19, 2012 | |
| John F. Kristoffersen | Detective | New York City Police Department | August 25, 2012 | |
| Steven L. Cioffi | Lieutenant | New York City Police Department | March 5, 2013 | |
| Carmen M. Figueroa | Detective | New York City Police Department | May 26, 2013 | |
| Steven Bonano | Deputy Chief | New York City Police Department | January 17, 2015 | |
| William Sheldon | Special Agent | Bureau of Alcohol, Tobacco and Firearms | March 2, 2015 | |
| Marcy Borders | Legal Assistant | Bank of America | August 24, 2015 | |
| Paul R. Stuewer | Investigator | New York State Police | October 5, 2016 | |
| Douglas Greenwood | Captain | New York City Police Department | December 12, 2017 | |
| William Allee | Chief of Detectives | New York City Police Department | May 24, 2018 | |
| Luis Alvarez | Detective | New York City Police Department | June 29, 2019 | |

==== Legal ====
Surviving first responders and their advocates are asserting that their illnesses have resulted from exposure to toxins at Ground Zero. The Patrolmen's Benevolent Association of the City of New York (PBA) filed a lawsuit to secure benefits for Officer Christopher Hynes, 36. In March 2004 he was diagnosed as having sarcoidosis. However, the NYPD has refused to bestow line-of-duty injury status to him. Hynes had worked for 111 hours at Ground Zero and its vicinity. He claims that he was never given a proper respirator for his work at Ground Zero. He has had difficulty in paying medical bills because of the denial of line-of-duty status. One medical provider sued him for $3,094 for medical bills. The provider eventually settled out of court for $1,625. The PBA noted that firefighters, by contrast, have been given line-of-duty status for their injuries.

=== Various volunteers ===
Hundreds of volunteer firefighters, construction workers, health professionals, clergy, and other individuals descended upon the scene in the days immediately following the attacks. These individuals volunteered directly at the Ground Zero site or cared for traumatized responders. Among individuals in the latter group, newspaper accounts have cited South Carolinian Episcopal nun, Sister Cindy Mahoney's death as a fatality of Ground Zero illness. Mahoney spent several months attending to first responders' spiritual needs. Two weeks prior to her death, she was cut off from her insurance. She choked to death on November 1, 2006, following five years of lung troubles.

Sen. Hillary Clinton on Sister Mahoney and Ground Zero illness: "We know that so many are now suffering health effects from breathing the toxic air at Ground Zero … Yet there are still some who doubt the link. By raising attention to her own devastating illness, Sister Mahoney will continue as she did in life, to help those affected by 9/11."

=== Communication workers ===
Communications recovery worker Mark DeBiase, aged 41, died on April 9, 2006, from a Ground Zero illness. He worked without protective gear for restoring communications at the site. "DeBiase's work was so crucial in emergency workers to communicate that he was shuttled between locations in a military helicopter," according to his father, Angelo DeBiase.

=== Janitorial workers ===
Manuel Checo is one of many janitors that performed cleanup work who now suffer from World Trade Center cough. He spent six months at the site. Compounding janitorial workers' troubles, three-quarters of them lack health insurance.

=== Financial district personnel ===
Civil rights attorney Felicia Dunn-Jones, 42, died February 10, 2002, from sarcoidosis. The city's chief medical examiner belatedly attributed her death to her being engulfed in the dust cloud from the collapse of the Twin Towers, one block from her office.

Mayor Rudy Giuliani acted quickly to "reopen Wall Street." The Wall Street area reopened for business on September 17.

=== Educators and students ===
Students and staff at Stuyvesant High School returned to the school which lies within one-third of a mile north of the World Trade Center site, while fires were still burning at Ground Zero. Alumni are circulating a petition for greater attention to health problems related to the Ground Zero air. There is a debate over whether the 2002 Class President Amit Friedlander's developing cancer is related to Ground Zero air.

In addition, the students and staff members at the Murry Bergtraum High School returned to the building a couple of days after the attack, with the air system in the school severely affected and damaged from the debris and dust from the World Trade Center site (the school is three-quarters of a mile east of the site). Several teachers, particularly from the business department, and students have developed asthma and other breathing problems because of the lack of unpolluted air and the failure to clean the school's central air system thoroughly years after the attack. Some students who were in the schools at the time of the attacks suffered from trauma related conditions such as depression, anxiety, and PTSD.

== Controversies ==
=== President George W. Bush's alleged manipulation of EPA statements ===
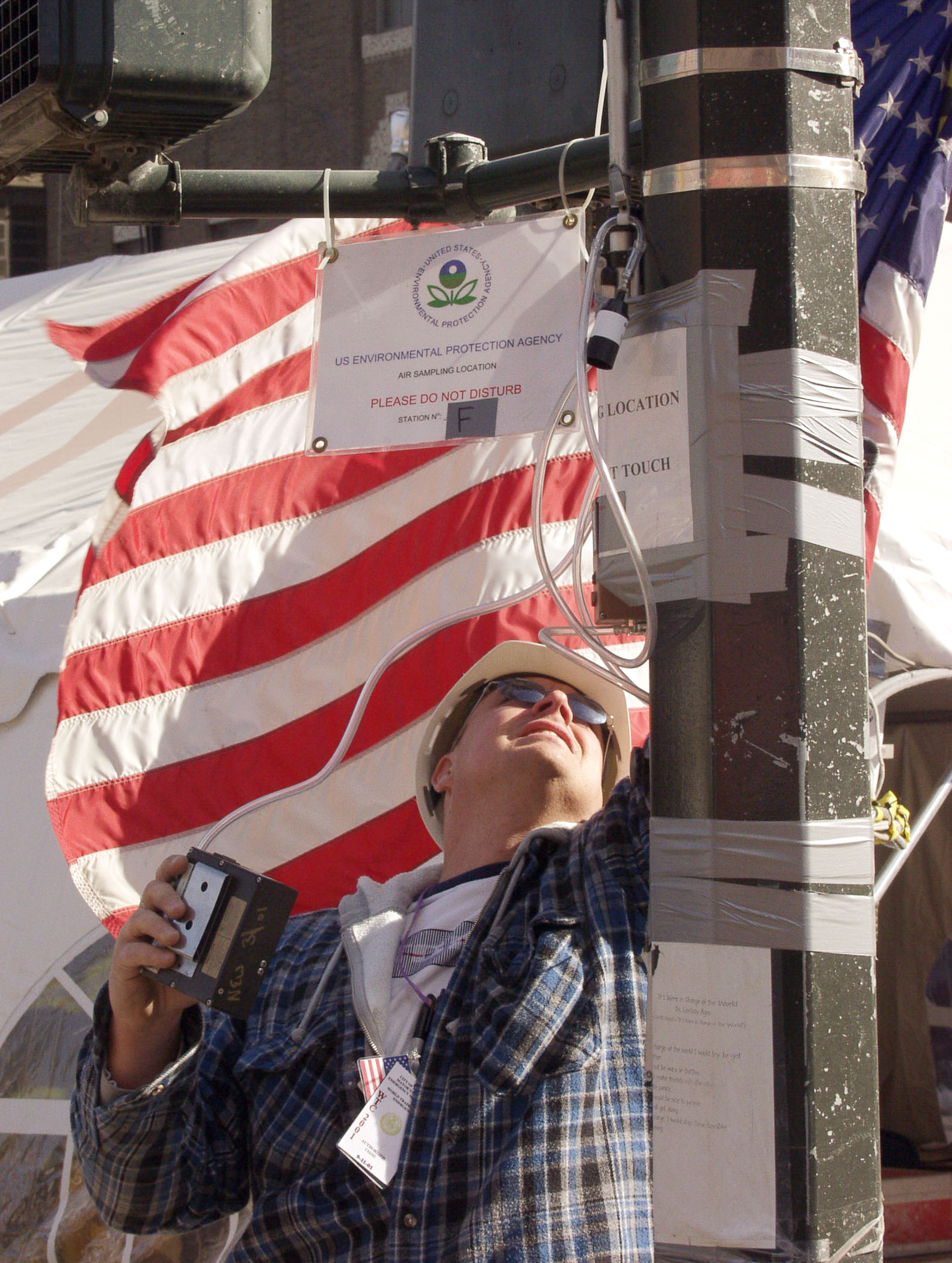
An Environmental Protection Agency employee checks one of the many air sampling locations set up around the site of the World Trade Center.

President George W. Bush has been faulted by the Sierra Club for allegedly interfering with the United States Environmental Protection Agency (EPA) interpretations and pronouncements regarding air quality.

=== Early statement by Christine Todd Whitman ===
On September 18, 2001, EPA administrator Christine Todd Whitman told the public, via a press release, "We are very encouraged that the results from our monitoring of air-quality and drinking-water conditions in both New York and near the Pentagon show that the public in these areas is not being exposed to excessive levels of asbestos or other harmful substances" and that "Given the scope of the tragedy from last week, I am glad to reassure the people of New York … that their air is safe to breathe and the water is safe to drink."

=== Alleged EPA deceptions about Ground Zero air quality ===
An August 2003 report by the Office of the Inspector General of the EPA said the Bush administration pressured the EPA to remove cautionary information about the air quality at Ground Zero.

Numerous key differences between the draft versions and final versions of EPA statements were found. A recommendation that homes and businesses near ground zero be cleaned by professionals was replaced by a request that citizens follow orders from NYC officials. Another statement that showed concerns about "sensitive populations" was deleted altogether. Language used to describe excessive amounts of asbestos in the area was altered drastically to minimize the dangers it posed.

In September 2006, the U.S. House Committee on Homeland Security held a two-day hearing on illnesses caused by post-9/11 air quality. Former EPA head Christine Todd Whitman was a frequent target of criticism.

EPA scientist Dr. Cate Jenkins said on CBS television on September 8, 2006, that agency officials lied about the air quality in the weeks following September 11, 2001. She said that in her opinion the EPA knew about the toxicity of the air, and that WTC dust included asbestos and disturbingly high pH levels. She said that some of the dust was "as caustic and alkaline as Drano." Dr. Marjorie Clarke also warned of the consequences of breathing toxic dust and fumes. Yet, agencies did not heed her warnings.

The New York State Department of Environmental Conservation conducted a study of the World Trade Center site, but refused to release the results of its study, saying they were part of a criminal investigation.

On September 13, 2006, Congressmen Jerrold Nadler (NY), Anthony Weiner (NY), Bill Pascrell Jr. (NJ) filed a request with US Attorney General Alberto Gonzales to investigate whether criminal charges may be brought against Whitman for lying about air safety in the Ground Zero area.

=== Alleged government downplaying of health risks ===
Critics assert that government officials – notably Bush, Christine Todd Whitman (former head of the US EPA), and New York City mayor Rudy Giuliani – downplayed the health risks of the area and rushed to reopen the area around Ground Zero, although this posed a grave and immediate health risk to first responders. Many corporations were eager to hear the news of the New York Stock Exchange being reopened only a few days after the collapse. On June 25, 2007, Whitman testified before a House of Representatives committee chaired by Jerrold Nadler. She said that a White House official informed her that President Bush expected that the Financial District would reopen within three days, that is, by September 14. She said that she replied that this would be cumbersome, since the EPA was still judging the health situation in the area. Investigations after the attacks suggest that the Bush administration pressured Whitman and Giuliani to provide health reassurances in order to keep Wall Street operating.

Two days after the collapse of the World Trade Center, mayor Giuliani said, "The air is safe as far as we can tell, with respect to chemical and biological agents." Giuliani, in attempting to deflate New York Daily News journalist Juan Gonzalez' reportage of the 9/11 air issue, claimed that "the problems created… are not health-threatening." In the first month after the attacks, the mayor said, "The air quality is safe and acceptable."

In November 2001, Giuliani wrote to the city's Congressional delegation and urged that the city's liability for Ground Zero illnesses be limited, in total, at $350 million. Two years after Mayor Giuliani finished his term, FEMA appropriated $1 billion to a special insurance fund to protect the city against 9/11 lawsuits.

In a September 18, 2006 New York Daily News article, Sally Regenhard, mother of firefighter Christian Regenhard who died on September 11, is quoted, "There's a large and growing number of both FDNY families, FDNY members, former and current, and civilian families who want to expose the true failures of the Giuliani administration when it comes to 9/11." She told the New York Daily News that she intends to "Swift Boat" Giuliani.

Then-senator Hillary Clinton contemplated calling Giuliani to testify before a Senate committee on whether the government failed to protect recovery workers from the effects of polluted Ground Zero air.

Congressman Nadler was quoted in a March 1, 2007, "New York Sun" article saying that he "absolutely" wishes to interview Giuliani administration officials regarding the environment in the aftermath of the September 11 attacks. He asked, "Who made decisions, if any, that resulted unnecessarily in a lot of people getting sick?"

=== Handling of cleanup procedure ===
A May 14, 2007, New York Times reported that thousands of workers at Ground Zero have become sick and that "many regard Mr. Giuliani's triumph of leadership as having come with a human cost." The Times reported that he seized control of the cleanup of Ground Zero, taking control away from established federal agencies, such as the Federal Emergency Management Agency, the Army Corps of Engineers and the Occupational Safety and Health Administration. He instead handed over responsibility to the "largely unknown" city Department of Design and Construction. Documents indicate that the Giuliani administration never enforced federal requirements requiring the wearing of respirators. Concurrently, the administration threatened companies with dismissal if cleanup work slowed.

Workers worked without proper respirators. They wore painters' masks or no covering. Specialists claim that the only effective protection against toxins such as airborne asbestos, is a special respirator. New York Committee for Occupational Safety and Health industrial hygienist David Newman said, "I was down there watching people working without respirators." He continued, "Others took off their respirators to eat. It was a surreal, ridiculous, unacceptable situation."

The local EPA office sidelined the regional EPA office. Dr. Cate Jenkins, a whistle-blower EPA scientist, said that on September 12, 2001, a regional EPA office offered to dispatch 30 to 40 electron microscopes to the WTC pit to test bulk dust samples for the presence of asbestos fibers. Instead, the local office chose the less effective polarized light microscopy testing method. Dr. Jenkins alleged that the local office refused, saying, "We don't want you f—ing cowboys here. The best thing they could do is reassign you to Alaska."

=== Lawsuit, settlement, and treatment costs ===
First responders and other individuals have sued the City of New York. Lawyers have criticized the city for failing to provide proper facial ventilators to clean-up workers. On October 17, 2006, federal judge Alvin K. Hellerstein rejected New York City's motion to dismiss lawsuits that requested health payments to the first responders.

On November 19, 2010, attorneys said that plaintiffs accepted a settlement which should lead to $625 million being paid to more than 10,000 workers experiencing problems as a result of inadequate preparation to work at Ground Zero. Not all affected participated, but those who did not would be eligible for a portion of $7.4 billion provided by the James Zadroga 9/11 Health and Compensation Act, which the U.S. House passed in September 2010. New York City Mayor Michael Bloomberg asked the Senate to do the same. The plaintiffs in the settlement would also be eligible for compensation under the Zadroga Act.

On December 22, 2010, the United States Senate passed a 9/11 Health Bill running against opposition of the Republican Party and aided by advocacy from comedian Jon Stewart. The measure calls for providing $1.8 billion until 2015 to monitor and treat injuries stemming from exposure to toxic dust and debris at World Trade Center site. There are nearly 60,000 people enrolled in health-monitoring and treatment programs related to the 9/11 attack. The bill is formally known as the James Zadroga 9/11 Health and Compensation Act, named after a New York police detective who took part in the rescue efforts at ground zero and later developed breathing complications.

On October 28, 2007, Jim Riches reported that the City of New York and litigating first responders have shown interest in a legal settlement, to resolve lawsuits against the city. The settlement would yield a financial settlement apportioned in the following manner: forty percent to lawyers, and sixty percent to litigants.

The National Institute for Occupational Safety and Health issued a study on July 17, 2007, indicating that the estimates for monthly costs of treating Ground Zero workers had increased from around $6 million per month to $20 million per month by the end of 2007. The causes of the increased expense lie in the increasing numbers of workers getting sick and the worsening illnesses of workers. This indicated that the planned U.S. House appropriation legislation (of $50 million) for the sick workers, for the coming year, would be inadequate. The number of workers that have registered with area hospitals' Ground Zero programs has reached 37,000. With about 500 new workers registering each month, the institute estimated that the number of registrants could reach 65,000 in two years. (The institute is overseen by the Department of Health and Human Services.) 40 percent of the World Trade Center workers being monitored by a Mount Sinai Hospital study lack health insurance.

In June 2008, New York City argued in federal court that 30 percent of the September 11 plaintiffs did not have serious injuries. This is part of a larger debate over the number of people sickened by the collapse of the Twin Towers.

=== World Trade Center health administrators ===
On June 11, 2007, Mayor Bloomberg appointed Jeffrey Hon as World Trade Center health coordinator. Hon had previously worked as the spokesman for the American Red Cross September 11 Recovery Program. People have offered conflicting statements, however, regarding Hon's role. In an interview with the New York Daily News Hon said that his role was to correct inconsistencies in city agencies and to handle related pension issues. Yet, Mayor Bloomberg said that Hon's role would not involve handling pension-related issues. A press release also indicated that the coordinator will "provide a central repository of WTC health information and ensure effective communication with those who may be experiencing 9/11-related health effects."

Dr. John Howard was appointed the medical administrator of the federal World Trade Center Health Program funded through the James Zadroga Act. On July 22, 2011, Howard's report on a study of a link between particulate exposure in the aftermath and cancer was released. The report said that there was insufficient evidence of a link between particulate exposure and cancer. The report's findings meant that many first responders to the attacks would be limited in their access to funds for medical treatment. Three New York Congressional delegation Representatives, Peter T. King, Carolyn B. Maloney and Jerrold Nadler, said that they believed that further studies would indicate a link between exposures and cancer.

=== Lawsuit by area residents ===
Lower Manhattan and Brooklyn residents brought a 111-page lawsuit against the EPA for purported deception of the public about hazards of Ground Zero air and dust. A major force behind this effort is Brooklyn resident Jenna Orkin of the World Trade Center Environmental Organization. On February 2, 2006, Federal Court Judge Deborah Batts issued an 83-page statement, indicating that there are sufficient grounds for the case to proceed. She also rejected granting Whitman immunity from the lawsuit.

On December 10, 2007, legal proceedings began in a case on the question of responsibility of government officials in the aftermath of the September 11, 2001, attacks. Former EPA Director Whitman is among the defendants in the suit; plaintiffs in the suit allege that Whitman is at fault for saying that the downtown Manhattan air was safe in the aftermath of the attacks.

On April 22, 2008, the United States Court of Appeals for the Second Circuit ruled that EPA head Whitman could not be held liable for saying to World Trade Center area residents that the air was safe for breathing after the buildings collapse. The appeals court said that Whitman had based her information on contradictory information and statements from President Bush. The U.S. Department of Justice had argued that holding the agency liable would establish a risky legal precedent because future public officials would be afraid to make public statements. Judge Deborah Batts had previously declined to dismiss Whitman as a defendant, saying that her actions were "conscience-shocking".

An arbitrator has said that most of the complainants that did not participate in an earlier fund (created by Congress) would be granted settlement awards. The awards would total $500 million. This resolution would involve all but 3 of the nearly 100 litigants.

=== Ground Zero workers' and area residents' protests ===
On January 30, 2007, Ground Zero workers and groups such as Sierra Club and Unsung Heroes Helping Heroes met at the Ground Zero site and urged President George W. Bush to spend more money on aid for sick Ground Zero workers. They said that the $25 million that Bush promised for the ill workers was inadequate. A Long Island iron-worker, John Sferazo, at the protest rally said, "Why has it taken you 5½ years to meet with us, Mr. President?"

Area residents joined the protest. Mariama James, who lives within blocks of the Ground Zero site, said that she became ill after cleaning the Ground Zero debris and dust from her apartment. "Recovery workers aren't the only people that were affected by this disaster," she said. "There are other people in need of treatment and monitoring."

=== Ground Zero workers' lawsuit ===
Families of Ground Zero workers have filed a mass lawsuit against the city. Andrew Carboy of the firm, Sulivan, Pappain, Block, McGrath and Cannovo said of the deaths of Cesar Borja, James Zadroga, and Mark DeBiase, "If Borja, Zadroga and now DeBiase isn't a wakeup call for the city, I don't know what will wake them."

By June 2007, the number of people filing claims against the city, regarding exposure to Ground Zero toxins, reached 10,000. Attorney David Worby is leading a class action lawsuit representing 8,000 people. By September 2007, the number of plaintiffs in the case reached 10,000. "I started this suit on behalf of one cop that got sick." He continued, "Nobody would touch the case with a 10-foot pole because it was considered unpatriotic to say anything against the cleanup or the EPA.

== Documentaries ==
- Fallout: The Health Impact of 9/11
- Dust to Dust: The Health Effects of 9/11
- The Toxic Clouds of 9/11: A Looming Disaster
- Toxic Legacy
- Sicko (written and directed by Michael Moore)
- No Responders Left Behind

== See also ==
- Casualties of the September 11 attacks
- Collapse of the World Trade Center
- James Zadroga 9/11 Health and Compensation Act
- Rescue and recovery effort after the September 11 attacks
- United States Environmental Protection Agency September 11 attacks pollution controversy
- World Trade Center Health Program
