= Michael Barasch =

American lawyer

Michael Alden Barasch (born c. 1955) is an American lawyer who was a chief advocate for first responders and others harmed by toxic dust in Lower Manhattan caused by the September 11 attacks. He has represented thousands of seriously injured members of the New York City Fire Department and police officers of the New York Police Department, both for their personal injuries as well as to protect their pension benefits. This includes police officer James Zadroga, who developed pulmonary fibrosis as a result of his exposure to the deadly 9/11 toxins. His death persuaded the United States Congress to pass the “James Zadroga 9/11 Health and Compensation Act.” The act reopened the first 9/11 Victim Compensation Fund (VCF) to provide benefits to those suffering with the harmful consequences of toxic exposure to the World Trade Center dust.

== Early life and education ==
After completing his undergraduate studies at Swarthmore College, Barasch moved to New York City, where he enrolled at Fordham University School of Law, graduating in 1980. Barasch described himself as the “worst student in the history of Fordham Law School”, and was only trying out a law career at the urging of his father. Saying “I went to law school only because I couldn't think of anything else to do with my history degree.” He also admitted that becoming a lawyer was a “total accident.”

== Law career ==
=== Early career ===
Barasch passed the New York bar exam in 1981, and a firm partner let him try dozens of cases. However, he grew frustrated because "older, more experienced lawyers would take advantage of my inexperience during trials,” Barasch said. “However, I learned the tricks of the trade — the stuff they don't teach in law school — from those veteran trial attorneys. Before long, I found myself winning cases that I had no business winning. That's really when I decided that I would stick with the law.” He continued to work in law as a personal injury lawyer. In 1994, he ran into former law school classmate Jim McGarry in the subway, and they soon opened a firm together.

=== 9/11 ===
When the September 11 attacks occurred, his offices 11 Park Place closed for a month due to lack of electricity. Soon after the attacks, Barasch found that firefighters’ breathing issues caused by the attacks could make New York City liable, if the problems persisted, because it failed to provide respiratory protection in accordance with Occupational Safety and Health Administration (OSHA) guidelines. In December, 2001, Barasch had a chance encounter with the special master of the 9/11 Victims’ Compensation Fund, Kenneth Feinberg. Barasch agreed to drop pending lawsuits that his firm had filed on behalf of the firefighters who, at that point, had been diagnosed with the “World Trade Center Cough.” In turn, Feinberg agreed to waive a requirement that first responders benefitting from the Fund must have sought medical help within the first 72 hours after the attacks. Barasch took all of his clients to the first Victim Compensation Fund, which closed its doors in 2003.

=== Zadroga Act ===
He represented police officer James Zadroga, who developed pulmonary fibrosis as a result of his exposure to the deadly 9/11 toxins. Zadroga was initially diagnosed with the “WTC cough” and an autopsy discovered ground glass and other toxins in his lungs. This was the medical evidence that enabled doctors to link the WTC dust to the respiratory illnesses that thousands of people were suffering from. Initially, when the Zadroga Act became law, the federal government made $2.4 billion available for treatment of illnesses stemming from the toxic dust, and made $2.7 billion available to compensate those whose health had declined since 2003 as a result of the dust.
