= Emergency Responder Health Monitoring and Surveillance =

An overview of ERHMS

Emergency Responder Health Monitoring and Surveillance (ERHMS) is a health monitoring and surveillance framework developed by a consortium of federal agencies, state health departments, and volunteer responder groups designed to address existing gaps in surveillance and health monitoring of emergency responders. The framework provides recommendations, guidelines, tools, and trainings to protect emergency responders during each phase of an emergency response, including pre-deployment, deployment, and post-deployment phases. ERHMS was designed to function within the Federal Emergency Management Agency's National Incident Management System (NIMS), a systematic approach to emergency management. The ERHMS trainings satisfy Public Health Emergency Preparedness capability 14, "Responder Safety and Health."

The guidelines and recommendations address the medical screening, training, rostering, surveillance and health monitoring of emergency responders. The framework includes different backgrounds such as emergency management, fire service, law enforcement, emergency medical services, public health, mental health, disaster relief, and volunteer organizations, as well as construction and other skilled support who may be participating in a broad range of activities including assessment, search and rescue, investigation, recovery, cleanup and restoration. This framework is designed for different types of events, independently of its magnitude, some events may include terrorist attacks, chemical spills, and natural disasters such as hurricanes, floods and earthquakes.

== Background and purpose ==
After the health effects among emergency responders to the September 11, 2001 attacks at the World Trade Center became apparent, public health and government officials began to call for improved emergency worker health monitoring and surveillance in the event of future disasters. A 2004 joint report from RAND Corporation and the National Institute for Occupational Safety and Health (NIOSH) entitled "Protecting Emergency Responders, Volume 3" called for enhanced protection of emergency workers in future emergency events and described several areas of improvement. Testimony from RAND in 2007 declared that there had been insufficient protection of 9/11 recovery workers and that future disasters should have an incident safety management structure in place that can make safety decisions and has the equipment, capabilities, and authority needed to implement and enforce them effectively.

In 2008, the Government Accountability Office (GAO) released a report entitled, "September 11: HHS Needs to Develop a Plan That Incorporates Lessons from the Responder Health Programs." This report called for a "plan for responder screening and monitoring services that defines the roles of HHS components and incorporates the lessons from the WTC health programs." The report named five lessons learned, including registering all responders, implementing robust physical and mental health screening and monitoring, providing treatment referral services, and ensuring that all responders, regardless of employment status or location, could access the same screening and monitoring programs and services.

In 2008, NIOSH coordinated a multi-agency effort to begin drafting the ERHMS framework.

=== Influence of the Deepwater Horizon oil spill response ===
In 2010, while the ERHMS framework was still in development, the Deepwater Horizon oil spill took place. NIOSH and the Unified Area Command (UAC), implemented some of the initial ERHMS guidelines, including deployment-phase rostering, injury and illness surveillance, assessment of and protection from chemical and environmental exposures, as well as prompt and accessible communication with workers and their communities.

Difficulties encountered in the spill response led NIOSH researchers to make recommendations that were then implemented in the evolving ERHMS framework. These recommendations included improving the rostering process both in the pre-deployment and deployment phases to ensure registration of all workers involved and better communication and transmission of guidance about environmental risks. Additional recommendations for the deployment phase included increased personal protective equipment (PPE) use, better management of heat stress, and improved reporting of exposures, illnesses, and injuries. NIOSH also recommended the creation of a decision matrix to determine the need for biological monitoring of workers. These recommendations were addressed in the finalized ERHMS documents.

== Brief summary of guidelines ==
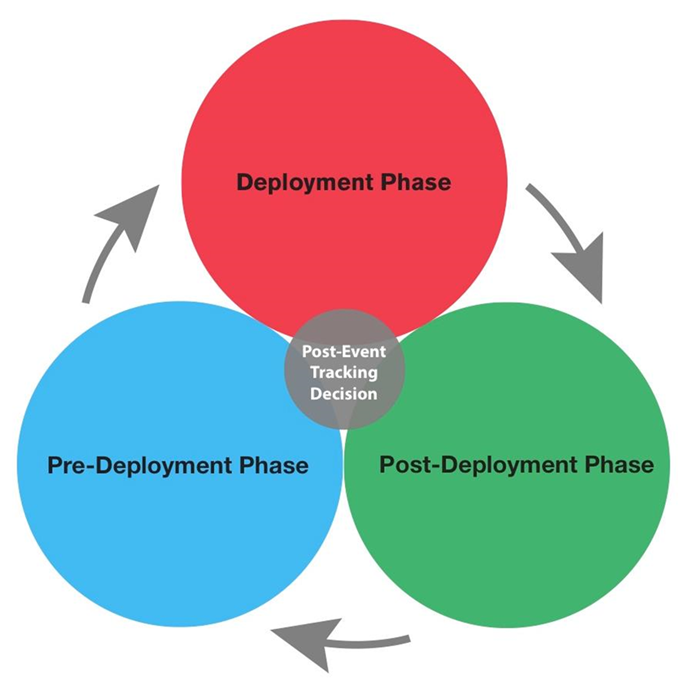
ERHMS framework phases

=== Pre-deployment phase ===
On the pre-deployment phase the ERHMS framework makes an emphasis on preparedness and establishes the foundations for monitoring and surveillance of responders. Pre-deployment focuses on key activities including rostering and credentialing of emergency response and recovery workers, health screening and immunizations, health and safety training and data managing and information security.

=== Deployment phase ===
During deployment, ERHMS guidelines recommend additional as-needed on-site rostering and on-site safety training. The deployment phase focuses on key activities such as on-site responder in-processing, health monitoring and surveillance, exposure assessment activities and controls, and communication of exposure and health data. Further, ERHMS recommends the implementation of a Health and Safety Plan (HASP), which monitors and documents worker activities and use of personal protective equipment, assesses any potential exposures, and surveys responder illness and injury, both physical and mental, throughout the duration of the response. In addition, the guidelines provide recommendations on how to conduct all of these activities and also how to communicate environmental exposures to workers in real time.

=== Post-deployment phase ===
ERHMS post-deployment guidelines focus on out-processing assessment, determination of need for health tracking and after action reporting. The guidelines recommend conducting exit interviews or surveys to capture and analyze exposures in order to determine the need for long-term monitoring of emergency responder health, or to identify subsets of responders who would benefit from future health monitoring. In addition, the guidelines recommend long-term follow-up in instances in which delayed or long-term adverse effects of deployment are possible. Finally, ERHMS provides for the creation of an after-action report, in which the management of the emergency response during all phases would be evaluated in order to identify lessons learned and areas for improvement.

== Publications ==
=== Technical documents and online training ===
The ERHMS working group released the documents for public comment in 2011. Among the groups that provided comments were the New York City Office of Emergency Management, the Collaborative for People with Disabilities, the National Clearinghouse for Worker Safety and Health Training, the National Association of State EMS Officials, the National Association of Emergency Medical Technicians, and Brigham and Women's Hospital.

The finalized framework, titled in full the "Emergency Responder Health Monitoring and Surveillance (ERHMS) NRT Technical Assistance Document (TAD)" was published on January 20, 2012, and a companion document, "Emergency Responder Health Monitoring and Surveillance: A Guide for Key Decision Makers," was published on February 6, 2012. The ERHMS framework is explained in two trainings; an online course consisting of four one-hour modules for all responders, and a one-hour leadership training module.

=== Software ===
NIOSH developed a free software platform named ERHMS Info Manager designed to track and monitor emergency response and recovery workers during a response. The software supports organizations efforts to implement the ERHMS framework, facilitating data collection, assessment, analysis and reporting.

== See also ==
- National Incident Management System (NIMS)
- National Response Plan (NRP)
- National disaster recovery framework (NDRF)
- World Trade Center Health Program
- Response analysis
