= John Feal =

American political activist advocating for first responders to the September 11 attacks

A video of John Feal discussing his experiences with the World Trade Center Health Program

John Feal (born November 13, 1966) is an American political activist and retired construction worker from Commack, NY, known for his advocacy on behalf of first responders to the September 11 attacks. In 2001, Feal was a demolition supervisor at Ground Zero when a falling steel beam landed on his foot. He developed gangrene, then sepsis, and eventually required partial amputation. As Feal's injury occurred just outside of a 96-hour window following the attack, he was denied compensation for the injury. The denial led to him becoming an advocate for 9/11 first responders. Feal founded the FealGood Foundation, dedicated toward lobbying members of the U.S. Congress to provide additional funding to 9/11 responders, as well as connecting responders with various resources. In 2019, Feal worked closely with comedian and fellow advocate Jon Stewart to lobby Congress for the renewal of a 9/11 victim's compensation fund. After Senators Rand Paul and Mike Lee opposed motion for unanimous consent of the renewal, Feal and Stewart appeared in a viral segment on Fox News lambasting the Senators.

Feal and his activism were profiled in the 2021 documentary film No Responders Left Behind.
