= Bedford Playhouse =

Nonprofit theater and arts center

Coordinates: 41°12′15″N 73°38′39″W

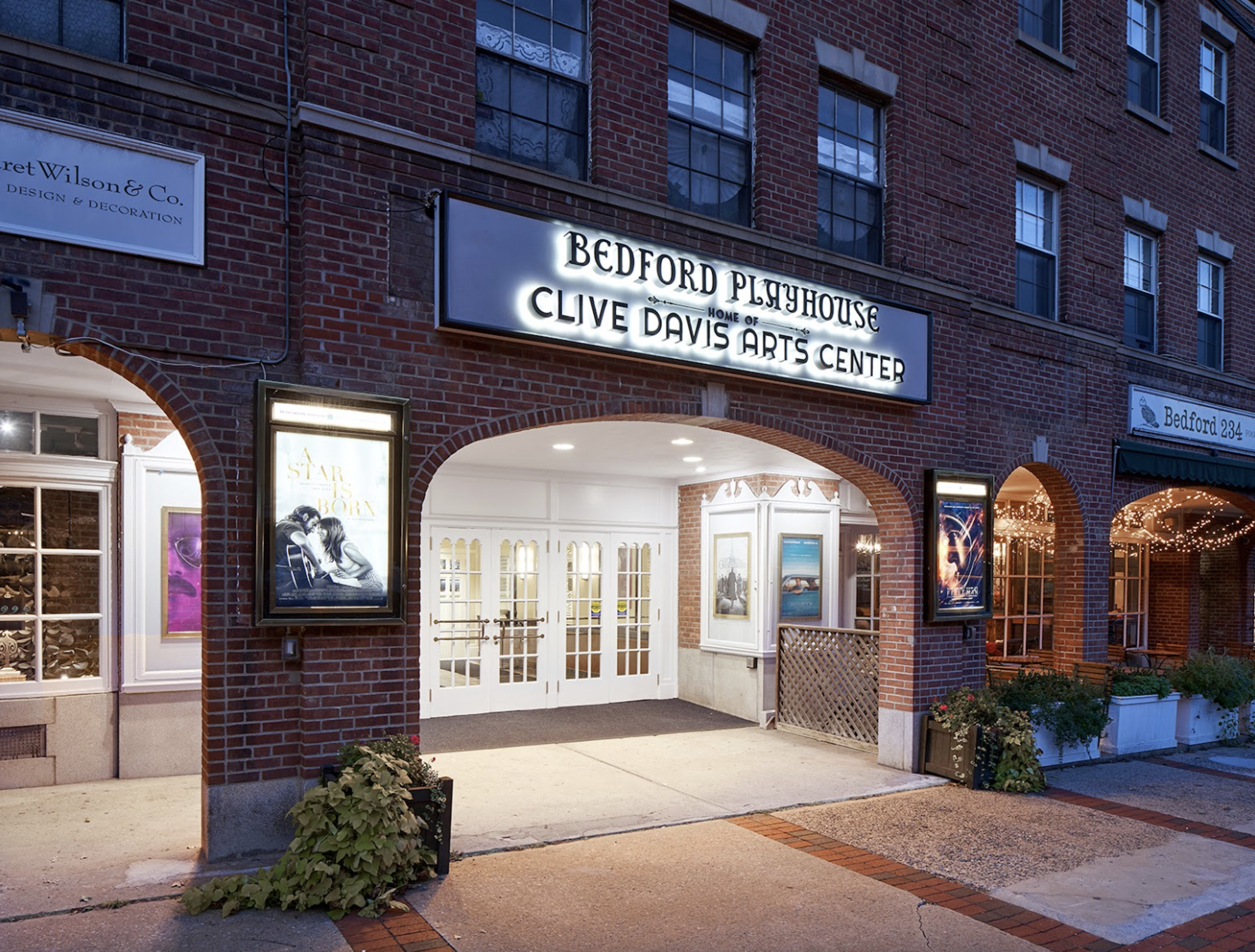
Front façade of Bedford Playhouse

The Bedford Playhouse, home of the Clive Davis Arts Center, is a nonprofit cinema and cultural arts venue located in Bedford, New York. The Playhouse presents films, author talks, live music, art exhibitions, and community programs. The facility includes three theaters, a gallery space, and a café with a full bar.

== History ==
Bedford Playhouse was originally designed and built by Joseph H. Stearns and opened in 1947 as a single-screen movie theater. Its first film, Boomerang! directed by Elia Kazan, marked the beginning of its operation as a neighborhood theater. At the time, ticket prices ranged from 30 to 80 cents.

In 1983, the property was sold to Bow Tie Cinemas, which later divided the original auditorium into two smaller theaters. In early 2015, Bow Tie opted not to renew its lease, and the theater closed after 68 years of operation.

Following its closure, Bedford residents launched a campaign called "Save the Playhouse". The campaign was led by John Farr, co-founder of The Avon Theatre in Stamford, Connecticut, and Sarah Long, who became Board Chair. The effort sought to restore and modernize the theater while expanding its use as a community-based arts center.

After several years of fundraising, Bedford Playhouse reopened in October 2018, following a redesign and modernization. The reopening marked the creation of The Clive Davis Arts Center, made possible through a philanthropic gift from Clive Davis, the music industry executive and Bedford resident.

The Bedford Playhouse operates as a 501(c)(3) nonprofit organization, supported by memberships, donations, grants, and ticket sales.

== Facilities ==
The Bedford Playhouse houses three theaters:

- The Main Theater – a 165-seat auditorium featuring a 37-foot-wide screen, 4K digital projection, and a Dolby Atmos sound system designed by architect and acoustician John Storyk.
- The Clive – a 40-seat theater named in honor of Clive Davis.
- The Worby – a 15-seat theater named in honor of David Worby, with removable seating for event versatility.

The facility also features the Playhouse Café and Bambi's Bar, which serve food and drink. On display in the café is a Baldwin grand piano, donated by musician Paul Shaffer and formerly used on the television show The Late Show with David Letterman from 1993 to 2015.

== Programming ==
Bedford Playhouse provides a range of film programming, including major studio releases, independent and documentary films, and classic cinema. In addition to film, the facility hosts live music performances, author talks, comedy nights, play readings, and art exhibitions, often in collaboration with artists and organizations.

Some events have included:

- A screening and Q&A of The Wife with actress Glenn Close.
- An author talk of Hard To Kill with James Patterson.
- Music performance by Rob Thomas of Matchbox Twenty.
- A staged reading and Q&A of The Making of Monsters with Brian Dennehy and Ron Hutchinson, marking Dennehy's final stage performance.
