= No Responders Left Behind =

Canadian documentary film

- Genre: Documentary
- Written by: Rob Lindsay
- Directed by: Rob Lindsay
- Starring: Jon Stewart; John Feal; Kirsten Gillibrand
- Music by: Matthew Reid
- Country of origin: Canada; United States
- Original language: English

Production
- Producers: Rob Lindsay; Jaime Sanchez; Kristine Yanoff; Kelly Aija Zemnickis
- Cinematography: Nicholas Kleiman
- Editor: Jaime Sanchez
- Running time: 79 minutes
- Production company: Paradox Pictures

Original release
- Network: Discovery+
- Release: September 9, 2021

No Responders Left Behind is a Canadian-American documentary television film, directed by Rob Lindsay and released in 2021. The film profiles the efforts of John Feal and Jon Stewart to advocate for passage and maintenance of the James Zadroga 9/11 Health and Compensation Act to compensate and assist first responders who have suffered a myriad of health problems relating to the September 11 attacks.

The film premiered September 9, 2021 on Discovery+.

The film was a Canadian Screen Award nominee for the Donald Brittain Award for best social or political documentary at the 10th Canadian Screen Awards in 2022.
