= Toxic Legacy =

- Produced by: Susan Teskey
- Production company: Canadian Broadcasting Corporation
- Release date: September 5, 2006
- Country: Canada

Toxic Legacy is a Canadian documentary film that was produced by Susan Teskey for the Canadian Broadcasting Corporation. It was broadcast on the CBC and Discovery Times on September 5, 2006. The film deals with the toxic legacy of the Ground Zero dust following the September 11 attacks in 2001 upon the World Trade Center.

It addresses the U.S. government's minimization of local health risks in the vicinity of Ground Zero site of the World Trade Center. It also addressed the praise of the first responders and the deleterious health effects thousands of these workers have experienced since their cleanup of the World Trade Center site.

9/11 Toxic Legacy won the 2007 Canada Golden Sheaf Award for Best Documentary in Science and Medicine.

== See also ==
- Casualties of the September 11 attacks
