= Marjorie Clarke =

Marjorie J. "Maggie" Clarke is an American environmental scientist who specializes in recycling participation, waste prevention methods, waste-to-energy/incinerator emissions controls, environmental impacts of the World Trade Center fires and collapse, and community botanical gardening. Since the September 11, 2001 attacks she has focused on increasing participation in New York City's waste prevention and recycling programs.

== Early life and education ==
She was born on July 14, 1953, in Miami, Florida. She graduated in 1975 with a B.A. in geology from Smith College. She received an M.S. in environmental science from Johns Hopkins University in 1978 and in energy technology from New York University in 1982. She completed a Ph.D. in 2000 for environmental sciences.

== Career and research ==
Clarke was the Department of Sanitation's specialist on emissions from incinerators from 1984 to 1988 and served on a National Academy of Sciences committee on Health Effects of Waste Incineration.

From 2002 to 2004, she was a scientist-in-residence and adjunct assistant professor at Lehman College, and an adjunct professor at Hunter College, City University of New York from 1996 to 2005.

In 2004, Clarke co-chaired a committee on waste prevention and reuse helping write and edit parts of the publication Reaching for Zero: The Citizens Plan for Zero Waste in New York City.

Clarke is a persistent questioner of United States Environmental Protection Agency's claims about the safety of the World Trade Center site.

She also conceived and garnered support for a New York City local law to eliminate 2200 apartment building incinerators which was signed into law in 1989.

=== NGO participation ===
Clarke has been chair or vice chair of the Manhattan Citizens' Solid Waste Advisory Board for 8 of the years since its inception in 1990. She co-founded and has been president of the Riverside-Inwood Neighborhood Garden (RING), a volunteer botanical garden in Upper Manhattan, since 1984.

== See also ==
- Health effects arising from the September 11, 2001 attacks
