= Toxic Clouds of 9/11 =

2006 film

The Toxic Clouds of 9/11: A Looming Disaster is a documentary film that was produced by Alison Johnson, the chair of the Chemical Sensitivity Foundation. The film addresses the health concerns of first responders at the World Trade Center site.

The Chemical Sensitivity Foundation is developing a registry of persons exposed to toxic dust from the collapsed buildings after the September 11 attacks.

The film was debuted at SUNY at New Paltz on June 12, 2006. It has been presented in the United States and in Canada.

== See also ==
- Health effects of September 11, 2001 attacks
