= Response analysis =

Response Analysis refers to the analysis of mitigation plans for emergency or disaster situations. These emergencies or disasters may be naturally occurring (e.g. hurricanes, earthquakes, disease outbreaks, etc.) or man-made (e.g. terrorism, bio-terrorism, industrial accidents, chemical spills, etc.). Since the terrorist attacks of September 11, 2001, the following Anthrax bio-terror attacks, and the disasters precipitated by Hurricane Katrina in 2005, emphasis has been put on the development of mitigation plans to prepare for such situations. The field of response analysis is the effort to analyze, validate, and optimize these mitigation plans using quantitative data and computational tools.

== Biological Emergencies ==
The Cities Readiness Initiative established a mandate for local governments in the USA to develop mitigation plans in advance of biological emergencies and implement such plans during these emergencies. The Strategic National Stockpile was established to support local governments by providing large quantities of needed medications or vaccinations rapidly. Development of computational tools to analyze and optimize biological emergencies are currently under development at the University of North Texas Center for Computational Epidemiology and Response Analysis.
