= James Zadroga 9/11 Health and Compensation Act =

Health care and support bill

James Zadroga 9/11 Health and Compensation Act of 2010
- Long title: An Act to amend the Public Health Service Act to extend and improve protections and services to individuals directly impacted by the terrorist attack in New York City on September 11, 2001, and for other purposes.
- Effective: January 2, 2011

Citations
- Public law: Pub. L. 111–347 (text) (PDF)
- Statutes at Large: 124 Stat. 3623

Codification
- Titles amended: Title 26—Internal Revenue Code; Title 42—The Public Health and Welfare
- U.S.C. sections created: 26 U.S.C. § 5000C; 42 U.S.C. §§ 300mm–300mm-61

Legislative history
- Introduced in the House as H.R. 847 by Carolyn Maloney (D–NY) on February 4, 2009; Committee consideration by House Energy and Commerce and House Judiciary; Passed the House on September 29, 2010 (268–160); Passed the Senate on December 22, 2010 (voice vote) with amendment; House agreed to Senate amendment on December 22, 2010 (206–60); Signed into law by President Barack Obama on January 2, 2011

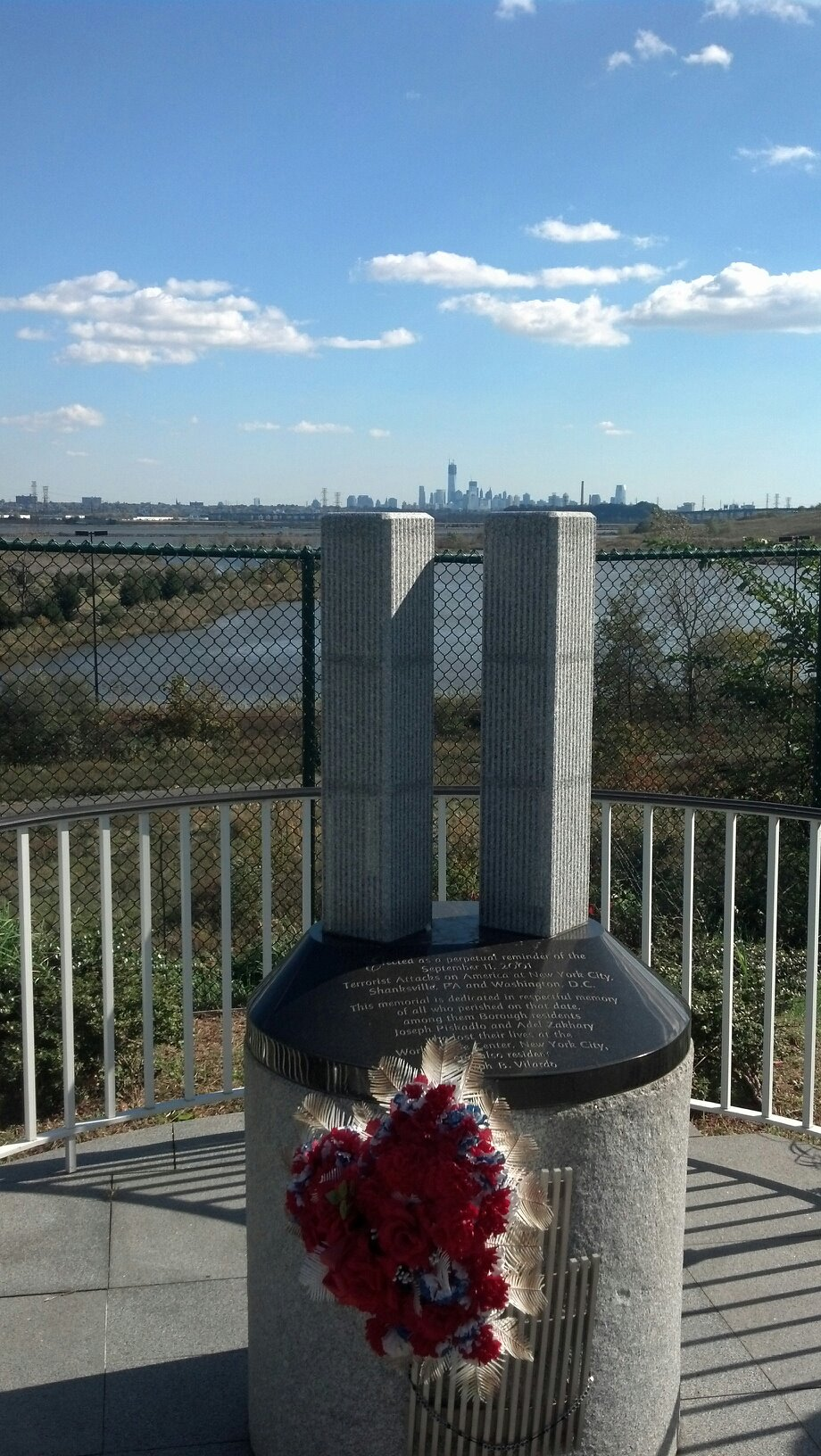
World Trade Center monument at Zadroga Field, North Arlington, New Jersey

The James Zadroga 9/11 Health and Compensation Act of 2010 (H.R. 847; Pub. L. 111–347 (text) (PDF)) is a U.S. law to provide health monitoring and aid to the first responders, volunteers, and survivors of the September 11 attacks. It is named after James Zadroga, a New York Police Department officer whose death was linked to exposures from the World Trade Center disaster. The law funds and establishes a health program to provide medical treatment for responders and survivors who experienced or may experience health complications related to the 9/11 terrorist attacks.

Senator Bob Menendez and Representative Carolyn Maloney initially co-sponsored the bill, which failed to pass in 2006. A different version of the bill passed both chambers in 2010 and was signed by President Barack Obama in the beginning of 2011. The bill was subsequently reauthorized in 2015, with coverage extended to 2090. The bill was permanently reauthorized in 2019 via H.R. 1327, which was sponsored by Senator Kirsten Gillibrand and Representative Carolyn Maloney and signed into law by President Donald Trump.

== History ==
In the state of New York, Governor George Pataki signed a bill to expand benefits for 9/11 first responders.

In the United States Congress, various bills had been introduced to provide forms of health care to responders and survivors of the 9/11 attacks. On February 2, 2005, Congresswoman Carolyn Maloney introduced the Remember 9/11 Health Act, which died in committee. On September 13, 2006, Senator Hillary Clinton brought an amendment to a piece of ports security legislation, aiming to create a five-year, $1.9 billion treatment program for sufferers of Ground Zero dust and fumes after-effects.

In February 2009, Congresswoman Maloney introduced the James Zadroga 9/11 Health and Compensation Act, which eventually passed following a protracted political battle in 2010. The U.S. House passed a new version of the act in September 2010. New York City Mayor Michael Bloomberg asked the Senate to do the same. In a Senate vote held on December 9, 2010, Democrats were unable to break a Republican filibuster against the bill. Opposed Republicans expressed concerns over the $7.4 billion cost of the bill. According to Republicans, the provisions to cover the cost of the healthcare program via an excise tax increase on foreign-made goods would violate international tax treaties. They also raised concerns about creating an expansive new healthcare entitlement program and re-opening the 9/11 Victims Compensation Fund. Many Republicans refused to end the filibuster until the Bush tax cuts were extended. Forty-two Senate Republicans had signed a pledge to filibuster all bills until the Bush tax cuts were renewed and the government was appropriately funded for the next several months. With only 57 votes to end the Senate filibuster and an incoming influx of Republicans in the wake of the 2010 Congressional Elections, the bill's future looked increasingly doubtful towards the end of 2010.

On December 16, 2010, after mentioning it in several previous segments of prior episodes, comedian Jon Stewart dedicated an entire episode of The Daily Show to the political battle over the Zadroga Act. Guests included four 9/11 first responders suffering from severe diseases and injuries related to their work near the WTC site. Stewart also interviewed Republican Mike Huckabee, who urged that "Every Republican should vote for this bill". Stewart also lambasted the lack of media coverage over the bill's political struggle in Congress. Stewart's coverage of the Republican filibuster raised media awareness of and public support for the bill, drawing praise from politicians and media outlets. White House Press Secretary Robert Gibbs acknowledged Jon Stewart's role in revitalizing support for the Zadroga Act, and The New York Times compared Jon Stewart to Edward R. Murrow, describing his coverage of the Zadroga debate as "advocacy journalism." New York City Mayor Michael Bloomberg described Stewart's coverage as "one of the biggest factors that led to the final agreement".

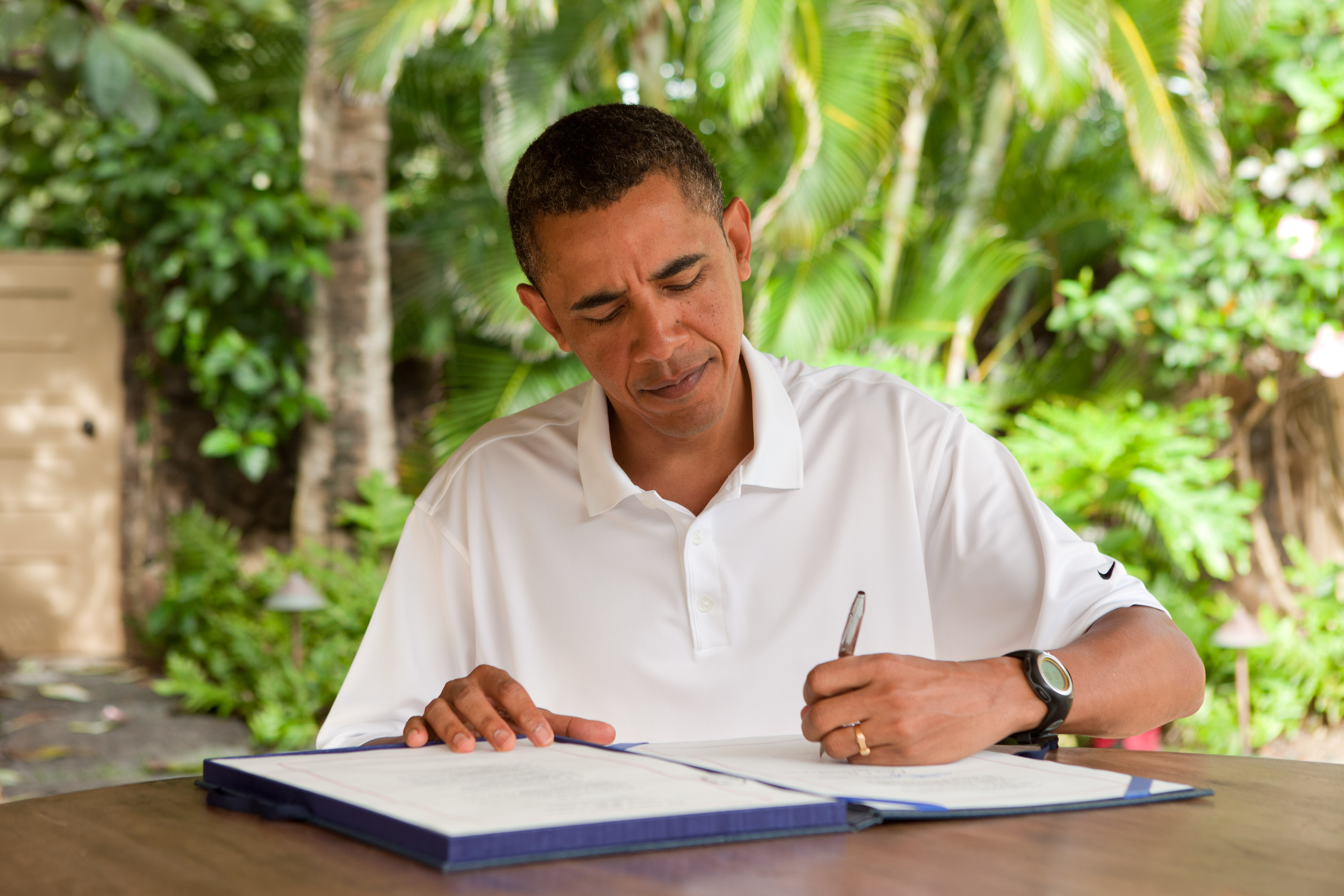
President Obama signing the James Zadroga 9/11 Health and Compensation Act of 2010 into law, January 2, 2011, at Plantation Estate in Hawaii

On December 19, 2010, New York Senators Chuck Schumer and Kirsten Gillibrand introduced a $6.2 billion version of the bill paid for in part by closing a corporate tax loophole and in part by a 2% excise tax on foreign goods that did not include countries with international procurement agreements with the U.S. On December 22, 2010, Congress approved the final bill, which allocated $4.2 billion towards the program, and President Barack Obama signed the Zadroga Act into law on January 2, 2011. This act created the World Trade Center Health Program, which replaced earlier programs (Medical Monitoring and Treatment Program and the WTC Environmental Health Center program). The World Trade Center Health Program provides treatment services and medical benefits for people who worked in response and recovery operations as well as for survivors of the 9/11 terrorist attacks.

On October 1, 2015, the Zadroga Act expired. Jon Stewart went to Congress with first responders and campaigned for the act's re-authorization. It was reauthorized in December 2015 and its coverage was extended to 75 years.

In February 2019, the Special Master administering the fund "determined that there is not sufficient funding to pay all pending and projected claims," and cut pending claims by 50% and new claims by 70%. On June 11, 2019, Jon Stewart testified before the House Judiciary Committee, demanding additional funding.

"I'm sorry if I sound angry and undiplomatic. But I'm angry, and you should be too, and they're all angry as well and they have every justification to be that way. There is not a person here, there is not an empty chair on that stage that didn't tweet out 'Never Forget the heroes of 9/11. Never forget their bravery. Never forget what they did, what they gave to this country.' Well, here they are. And where are they? And it would be one thing if their callous indifference and rank hypocrisy were benign, but it's not. Your indifference cost these men and women their most valuable commodity: time. It's the one thing they're running out of."

— Jon Stewart, House Judiciary Committee testimony, June 11, 2019

The next day the Committee unanimously passed a bill which would permanently reauthorize the 9/11 Victim Compensation Fund.

== Impact ==
In 2008, the National Response Team began a multi-agency effort to draft guidelines for protecting the health of emergency responders in the event of future disasters. The product of this effort, the Emergency Responder Health Monitoring and Surveillance framework, was published in 2012.

The act allocated $4.2 billion to create the World Trade Center Health Program, which provides testing and treatment for people suffering from long-term health problems related to the 9/11 attacks. The WTC Health Program replaced preexisting 9/11-related health programs such as the Medical Monitoring and Treatment Program and the WTC Environmental Health Center program. The Zadroga Act required the WTC Health Program to begin administering medical benefits on July 1, 2011.

Section 301, codified at 26 U.S.C. 5000C, imposes a 2% excise tax on certain Federal procurement payments to certain foreign persons. The amount of tax due is to be retained by the federal agency concerned and submitted to the Internal Revenue Service.

== Reauthorization ==
On December 18, 2015, the James Zadroga 9/11 Health and Compensation Reauthorization Act passed as part of the Consolidated Appropriations Act, 2016, which extended medical benefits to affected individuals until 2090.

== Missing funds ==
Beginning in 2016, the Treasury Department withheld payments to the FDNY World Trade Center Health Program established by the Zadroga Act. New York City was using the funds to pay the Department of Health and Human Services, which was not the intended purpose for these funds. By the time this was revealed in 2020, around $3.7 million had been withheld from the FDNY program.
