= David Worby =

American lawyer

David E. Worby
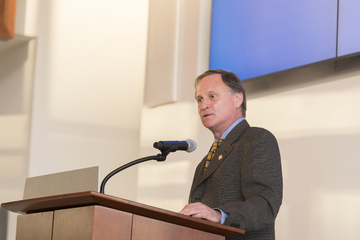
- Occupation: Lawyer
- Website: http://www.wvelaw.com

David E. Worby is a trial lawyer who specializes in personal injury cases. As a lawyer, he is known for representing the largest number of clients experiencing Ground Zero illness. He is a published author in American Trial Lawyers Magazine.

== Early life and career ==
Born in Rockland County, New York in 1953, Worby graduated from Cornell University, where he received honors degree in 1973 and from the Villanova University School of Law, where he received a J.D. in 1976. Worby is the founder and a senior partner of the law firm, WorbyVecchio Edelman, LLP (formerly known as Worby Groner Edelman, LLP) based in White Plains, NY. He is a nationally recognized trial attorney with a record of winning jury verdicts. Worby has also hosted two of his own talk shows: "Worby's World" and "Worby's Law."

He has lectured and been speaker for Cornell University, Pace Law School, Villanova Law School, the New York State Trial Lawyers Association, the American Trial Lawyers Association, and other Bar Associations. He founded both the David E. Worby Scholarship Fund and the David E. Worby Course in Advanced Trial Practice at his alma mater, Villanova Law School to encourage aspiring attorneys. He also sits on the boards of the Avon Theatre Film Center, Student Assistance Services, Kennedy Center For The Arts, endowed a Chair at Cornell University, and funded the Worby Clinical Practice Offices at Villanova University School of Law where he was an editor of the Villanova Law Review.

Worby is a published author in the American Trial Lawyers Magazine and his firm was co-lead counsel for the 9/11 class action lawsuit. He also sits on the Katonah Museum Board, the Bedford Playhouse Board, Bedford Historical Society Board, and the Heroes in Transition Board for injured soldiers. He is also building the Worby Theater, a 100-seat theater in Bedford, New York.

Worby is a BMI songwriter with song catalog representation by Dan Hodges Music. As a playwright, Worby's play Very Truly Yours, starring Edward Albert Jr., had its world premiere at the Tiffany Theaters.

== Represented victims of the September 11, 2001 attacks ==
Worby represented the largest number of clients experiencing Ground Zero illnesses. According to New York Magazine: "[Worby] is a New York City lawyer, who filed the first lawsuit for a leukemia-stricken NYPD detective who served at Ground Zero and the Fresh Kills landfill, a case that mushroomed into a massive class action with 8,000 WTC workers.".

By September 2007, the number of plaintiffs in the case reached 10,000. "I started this suit on behalf of one cop that got sick ... Nobody would touch the case with a 10 foot pole because it was considered unpatriotic to say anything against the cleanup or the EPA."

Worby faults government officials for individuals' illnesses:

They are getting sick because of people like Christine Todd Whitman and Rudy Giuliani ... [M]y people don't want their names to be on the wall, because they are not victims of terrorists --they're victims of bad government. Giuliani should be banned from public office for what he did.

Worby's firm has filed suit against the City of New York, the Port Authority and the Environmental Protection Agency. The suits allege that dust from the 9/11 attacks made the plaintiffs sick, and seek billions of dollars in funding for medical screening and treatment and billions more in damages. The majority of the plaintiffs are suffering from asthma, sinusitis, chronic bronchitis. But others have kidney and heart problems. Worby claimed at least 100 victims are suffering from various kinds of cancer, including leukemia, Hodgkin's disease, and esophageal and thyroid cancers.

According to a report in New York Magazine some doctors believe that and have said that the carcinogens in the WTC dust accelerated cancers that were already under way in some rescue workers, either by promoting further mutations in genes whose cancerous transformations were nearly complete, or by tampering with genes that suppress these deadly mutations. Exposure to the unprecedented combination of carcinogens and immune suppressants in the dust caused shortened latency periods for cancers that would generally take far longer to develop.

== Personal life ==
He is the brother of American conductor Rachael Worby and Joshua Worby, Executive & Artistic Director of the Westchester Philharmonic.

== See also ==
- Health effects arising from the September 11, 2001 attacks
- Rescue and recovery effort after the September 11, 2001 attacks
