= Plantation Estate =

Building in Kailua, Hawaii, United States

Coordinates: 21.422954°N 157.744027°W

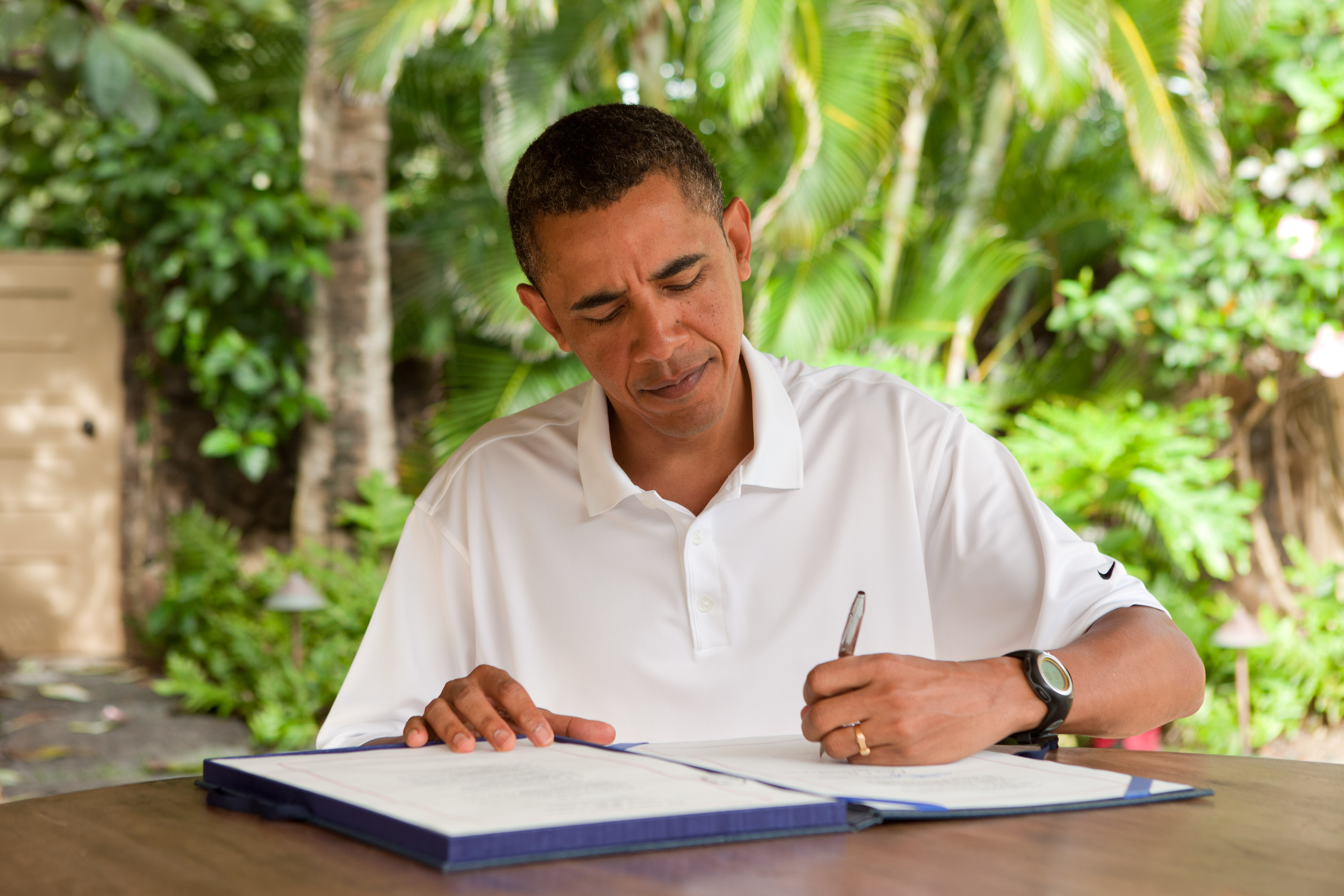
Obama signing the James Zadroga 9/11 Health and Compensation Act of 2010 on January 2, 2011

Plantation Estate is a single-story, wood-frame, 5,000-square-foot (460 m^{2}) Pacific Ocean-front house at 57 Kailuana Place in Kailua, Honolulu County, Hawaii, which former president Barack Obama rented for use during his Christmas vacations from 2008 to 2016.

The house is less than one mile (1.6 km) south of the Marine Corps Base Hawaii. Obama exercised at the Semper Fit Center at the base and attended dinners there during his visits.

== Obama visits ==
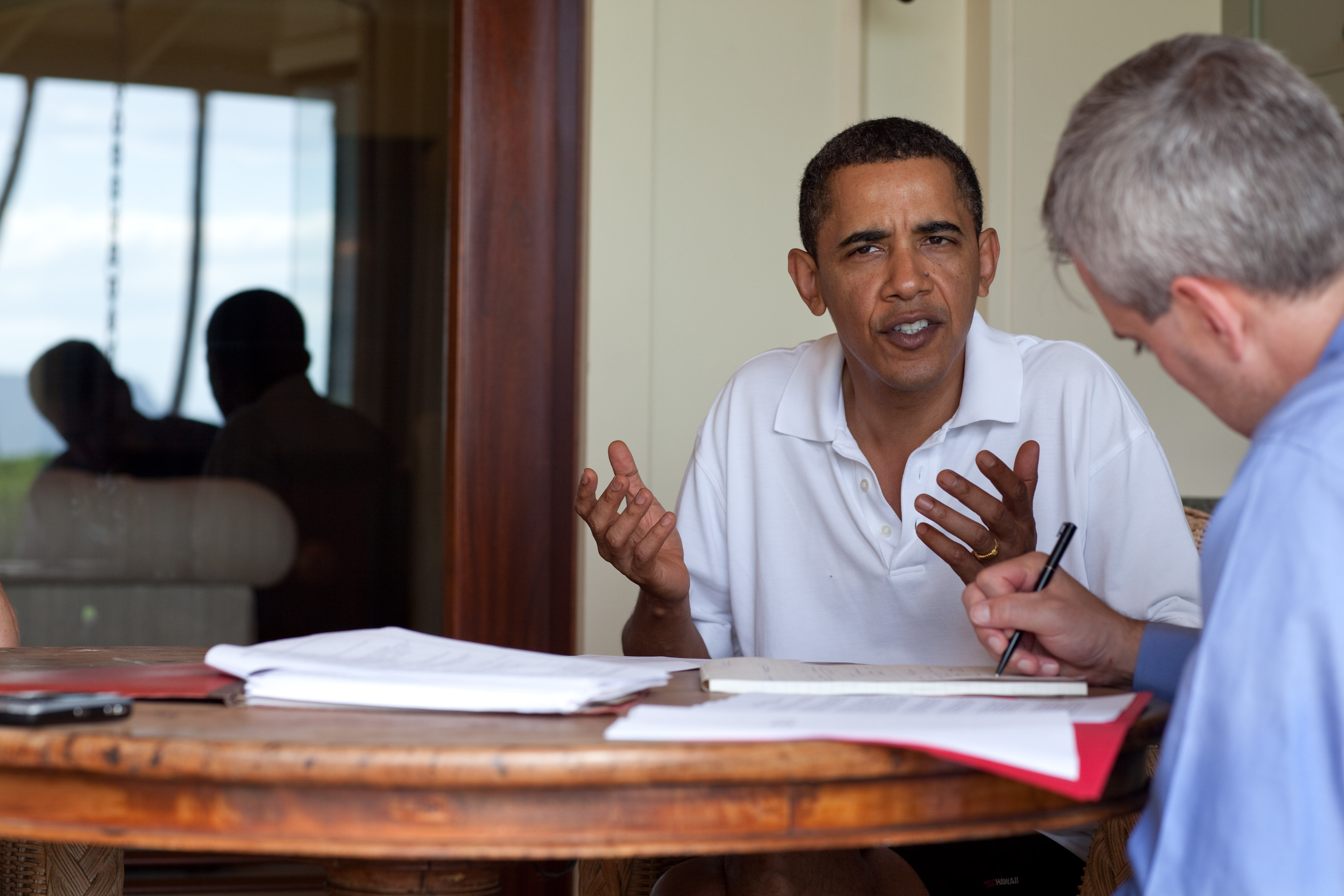
Obama meets in Kailua on December 29, 2009, with National Security Council chief of staff Denis McDonough concerning the attempted terrorist attack of an airliner on Christmas Day.

- August 8–14, 2008 – Obama visited Kailua during the 2008 United States presidential election campaign. He stayed at a different house belonging to Jill Tate Higgins, the general partner of Lakeside Enterprises, a Burbank, California, private family investment company. During this visit, he would visit his grandmother, Madelyn Dunham, for the final time before her death. Dunham raised Obama in Honolulu from age 10.
- December 20–31, 2008 – Obama, in his first visit to Plantation Estate, took a two-week vacation after winning the election. He would scatter his grandmother's ashes at Lanai Lookout at the same location where he had scattered the ashes of his mother, Stanley Ann Dunham, in 1995. His grandmother had passed two days before Obama's election. Obama would also visit the beach, leading to shirtless pictures becoming widely circulated.
- December 24, 2009 – January 3, 2010 – During this visit, Obama went to the grave of his maternal grandfather, Stanley Armour Dunham, at the National Memorial Cemetery of the Pacific. Obama's trip was cut short following the attempted Christmas bombing of Northwest Flight 253.
- December 23, 2010 – January 4, 2011 – Obama arrived on December 23 for a planned 11-day visit following the lame duck congress' approval of the New START treaty. Michelle Obama, Malia Obama, and Sasha Obama, as well as their dog Bo, left for Hawaii on December 18 while flying on a C-40B Special Mission Aircraft. Press reports indicated that the President's family not flying with him cost an additional $63,000 to $100,000. He extended his departure date one day to January 4. During this visit, he made recess appointments of James M. Cole to be United States Deputy Attorney General, William J. Boarman to be Public Printer of the United States, Matthew Bryza to be United States Ambassador to Azerbaijan, Norman L. Eisen to be ambassador to the Czech Republic, Robert Stephen Ford to ambassador to Syria and Francis J. Ricciardone, Jr. to be United States Ambassador to Turkey. During this trip, Hawaii Governor Neil Abercrombie, who knew Obama and his family as a child, said he would seek to find a way to release the President's birth certificate. This came in response to citizenship conspiracy theories alleging Obama as being born in Kenya rather than the United States. He also dined with his half sister, Maya Soetoro-Ng, at Alan Wong's Restaurant near his childhood home in Honolulu. Obama also snorkeled with family at Hanauma Bay. Obama's reading list for the trip included The Thousand Autumns of Jacob de Zoet by David Mitchell, Our Kind of Traitor by John le Carré, and President Reagan: The Role of a Lifetime by Lou Cannon. Obama signed the James Zadroga 9/11 Health and Compensation Act of 2010 on January 2, 2011.
- December 23, 2011 – Obama arrived six days after his family and stayed until January 1, 2012. Reportedly, this year's vacation home was a few doors down from the home used in the previous years.
- December 21, 2012 – Obama arrived at the same house he stayed in 2011.

== See also ==
- List of residences of presidents of the United States
