= James Zadroga =

American police officer (1971–2006)

- Born: February 8, 1971; North Arlington, New Jersey, U.S
- Died: January 5, 2006 (aged 34)
- Spouse: Rhonda Zadroga (d. 2005)
- Police career
- Department: New York City Police Department
- Service years: 1992–2006
- Rank: Detective

James Zadroga (February 8, 1971 – January 5, 2006) was a New York City Police Department (NYPD) officer who died of a respiratory disease that has been attributed to his participation in rescue and recovery operations in the rubble of the World Trade Center following the September 11 attacks. Zadroga was the first NYPD officer whose death was attributed to exposure to his contact with toxic chemicals at the attack site.

Zadroga had joined the New York City Police Department in 1992 and attained the rank of Detective. He was a healthy non-smoker and had no known history of asthma or other respiratory conditions before spending 450 hours participating in the recovery efforts at the 9/11 attack site. Weeks after his time at the World Trade Center site, Zadroga developed a persistent cough, and, as the months progressed, he developed shortness of breath and became unable to walk distances more than 100 feet without gasping for air.

The September 11th Victim Compensation Fund awarded Zadroga a monetary settlement in excess of $1 million in 2004, after determining that his exposure to dust at Ground Zero had caused his respiratory illness. The New York City Police Department Medical Board approved his application for permanent disability retirement that same year, after concluding that his illness was related to dust exposure.

== Cause of death ==
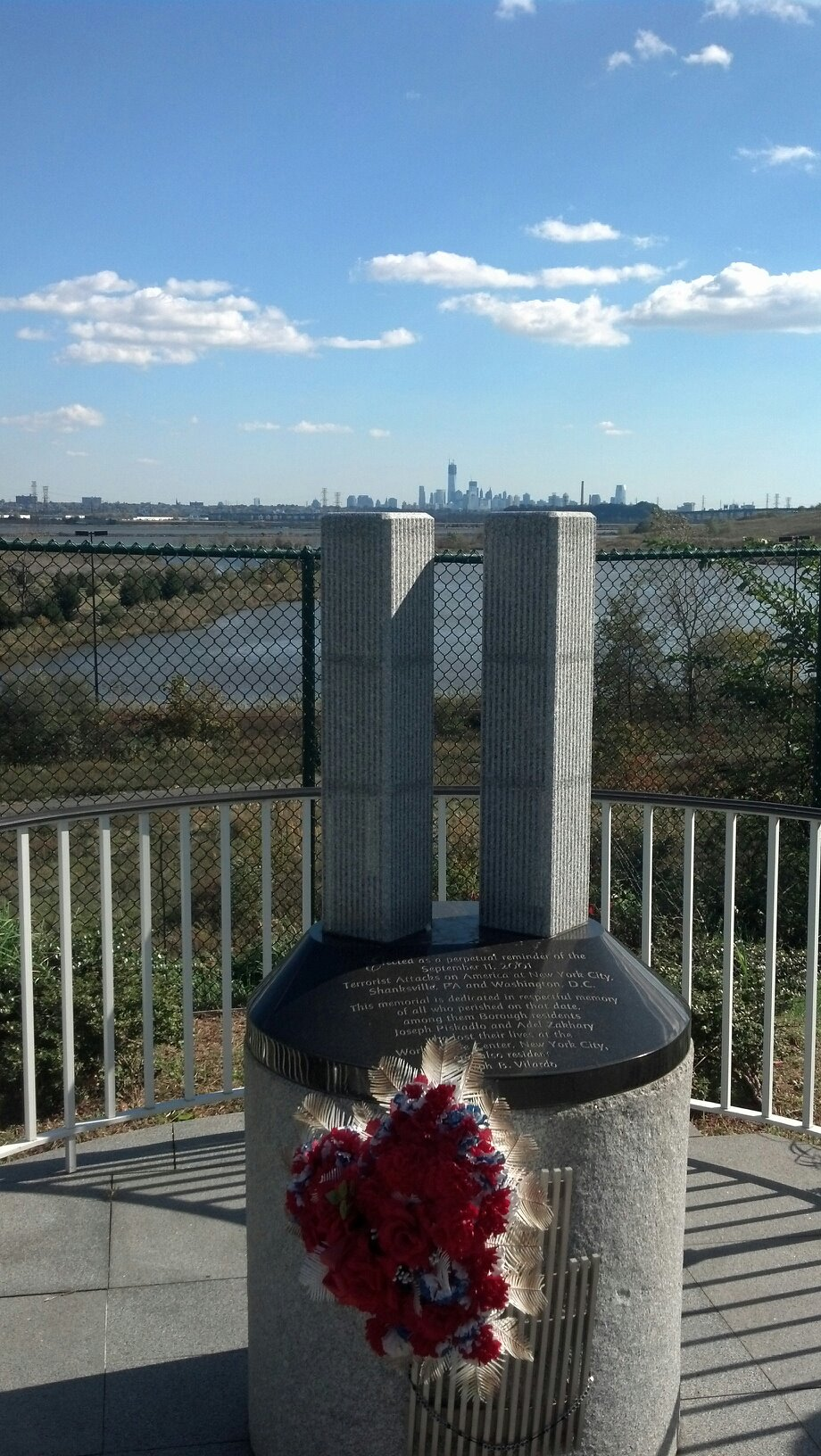
World Trade Center monument at Zadroga Field, North Arlington, New Jersey

The causes of Zadroga's death are under dispute. Gerard Breton, a pathologist of the Ocean County, New Jersey medical examiner's office, conducted an autopsy in April 2006, and he reported, "It is felt with a reasonable degree of medical certainty that the cause of death in this case was directly related to the 9/11 incident." This attribution made Zadroga, 34 years old at the time of his death, the first 9/11 responder whose death was directly linked with toxic Ground Zero substances. Breton's autopsy found what he described as "unidentified foreign materials" in Zadroga's lungs, which were identified by the Armed Forces Institute of Pathology in Washington, D.C. as talc, cellulose, calcium phosphate, and methacrylate plastic; However, the examination did not compare the particles found in his lungs with actual dust from the World Trade Center site.

The New York City Medical Examiners Office asserted in October 2007 that Zadroga's death was not related to his time at Ground Zero, with Chief Medical Examiner Charles Hirsch and another medical examiner signing a statement that "It is our unequivocal opinion, with certainty beyond doubt, that the foreign material in your son’s lungs did not get there as the result of inhaling dust at the World Trade Center or elsewhere". Hirsch concluded that Zadroga died from self-injection of ground drugs, with Hirsch finding severe scarring in his lungs that he determined was caused by cellulose and talc granulomas and stating (through a spokesperson) that "The lung disease he had was a consequence of injecting prescription drugs". Officials from the Chief Medical Examiner's office met with the Zadroga family to present his findings.

In response to the City Medical Examiner's autopsy results, Mayor of New York City Michael Bloomberg stated "We wanted to have a hero, and there are plenty of heroes, it’s just in this case, science says this was not a hero" at remarks made after receiving an award from the Harvard School of Public Health, but backed away from his earlier characterization at a news conferences stating that "This was a great N.Y.P.D. officer who dedicated himself — put his life in harm’s way hundreds of times during his career — and you can use your own definition."

A third opinion obtained by Zadroga's family later that month from Dr. Michael Baden, chief forensic pathologist of the New York State Police (and former New York City Medical Examiner), backed the original claim of WTC dust responsibility, citing the presence of glass fibers in Zadroga's lungs that could not be related to injecting drugs. James' father, Joseph, said that the medical examiner reported no "track marks on his arms or body" and that his son had taken anti-anxiety medications and painkillers including OxyContin, but had never ground up and injected the drugs.

== James Zadroga Acts ==
Then-Governor of New York George Pataki signed legislation on August 14, 2006, to expand death benefits to Ground Zero workers who die from cancer or respiratory diseases, under the presumption that the cause was due to exposure during recovery efforts. Pataki mentioned Zadroga at the bill-signing ceremony, held at the World Trade Center site.

At the federal level, Zadroga became namesake for the James Zadroga 9/11 Health and Compensation Act of 2010, which provides health monitoring and financial aid to 9/11 first responders and survivors. The Act covers medical and other expenses for a specific list of diseases and conditions. These include interstitial lung diseases, asthma, and gastroesophageal reflux disease. Initially, the latency period often associated with diagnosing cancer has created a potential hurdle in appropriately compensating individuals who may die or become ill in the future as a result of their exposure following the 2001 tragedy. Since its creation, additional conditions have been made eligible: in September 2012, 50 different types of cancers were added, and in September 2013, prostate cancer was added to the list.

== Personal life ==
Zadroga was of Polish descent. He had been married. His wife, Rhonda, had died in Florida in October 2005 due to a heart ailment.

Zadroga was honored in his hometown of North Arlington, New Jersey with the renaming of the Skyline Sports Complex, from which the Twin Towers could be seen, which became the James Zadroga Soccer Field as of September 21, 2008. The borough has also dedicated two monuments to Zadroga as part of the ceremonies.

== See also ==
- Collapse of the World Trade Center
- Health effects arising from the September 11 attacks
- World Trade Center Health Program
