= National disaster recovery framework =

The National Disaster Recovery Framework (NDRF) is a guide published by the US Government to promote effective disaster recovery in the United States, particularly for those incidents that are large-scale or catastrophic. The NDRF was released in September 2011 by the Federal Emergency Management Agency (FEMA).

The NDRF provides the overarching inter-agency coordination structure for the recovery phase for incidents covered by the Stafford Act. Elements of the NDRF can also be used for significant non-Stafford Act incidents. It serves as a companion document to the National Response Framework (NRF).

The NDRF defines core recovery principles, roles, and responsibilities of recovery coordinators and other stakeholders, a coordinating structure that facilitates communication and collaboration among all stakeholders, guidance for pre-and post-disaster recovery planning, and the overall process by which communities can capitalize on opportunities to rebuild.

== History ==
In the aftermath of Hurricane Katrina, the United States government passed federal legislation that mandated the creation of a national-level disaster recovery strategy. FEMA took the lead in developing the NDRF, releasing the first edition in September 2011 and the second edition in June 2016. The NDRF has been updated to include guidance for effective recovery by defining the roles, responsibilities, coordination, and planning among Federal, State, Local, Tribal, and Territorial jurisdictions.

FEMA is one of the first government agencies in the world to develop a disaster recovery framework. The NDRF served as key reference document for the World Bank, UNDP, and European Union in issuing the Guide to Developing Disaster Recovery Frameworks.

The NDRF created four new concepts:

== Federal Disaster Recovery Coordinator ==
As the level of response activities declines and recovery activities accelerate, the Federal Disaster Recovery Coordinator (FDRC) will engage with the Recovery Support Function (RSF) agencies to organize and coordinate federal recovery assistance. During this early recovery phase, the FDRC and the RSF coordinators are working closely with Emergency Support Function (ESF) leads to share information about impacts, assistance provided, and working relationships at all levels.

== State or Tribal Disaster Recovery Coordinators ==
The role of the Local Disaster Recovery Managers (LDRMs), the State Disaster Recovery Coordinators (SDRCs) and Tribal Disaster Recovery Coordinators (TDRCs) is to organize, coordinate, and advance the recovery at the local, state, or tribal level. The experience and skill sets of these individuals should include a strong basis in community development and good knowledge of the community's demographics.

While these positions will often interact with the emergency management community, it is not necessary that these individuals be emergency management professionals. Their primary role is to manage and coordinate the redevelopment and building of community. In addition, the individuals occupying the positions should be able to represent and speak on behalf of their respective chief executives (e.g., mayor, governor, tribal leader). The LDRMs and TDRCs serve as the jurisdiction's primary point of contact (POC) with the SDRC.

== Recovery Support Functions (RSFs) ==
The RSFs are:

- Community Planning and Capacity Building
- Economic
- Health and Social Services
- Housing
- Infrastructure Systems
- Natural and Cultural Resources
