= World Trade Center lung =

Health effect of the September 11 attacks

World Trade Center lung is the name for a collection of lung diseases found in people who worked at or were near to the Ground Zero site of the September 11 attacks in New York City. This cluster of diseases includes asthma, asthmatic bronchitis, terminal airways disease, sarcoidosis, and acute eosinophilic pneumonia.

The particulate matter from the destruction of the towers contained fibrogenic and other harmful materials also found in responders' lungs, including fiberglass, asbestos, aluminum, calcium silicate, polycyclic aromatic hydrocarbons, silica, vitreous fibers, carbon nanotubes, fly ash, titanium, magnesium silicate, and phosphate.
