= World Trade Center Health Program =

American health care program

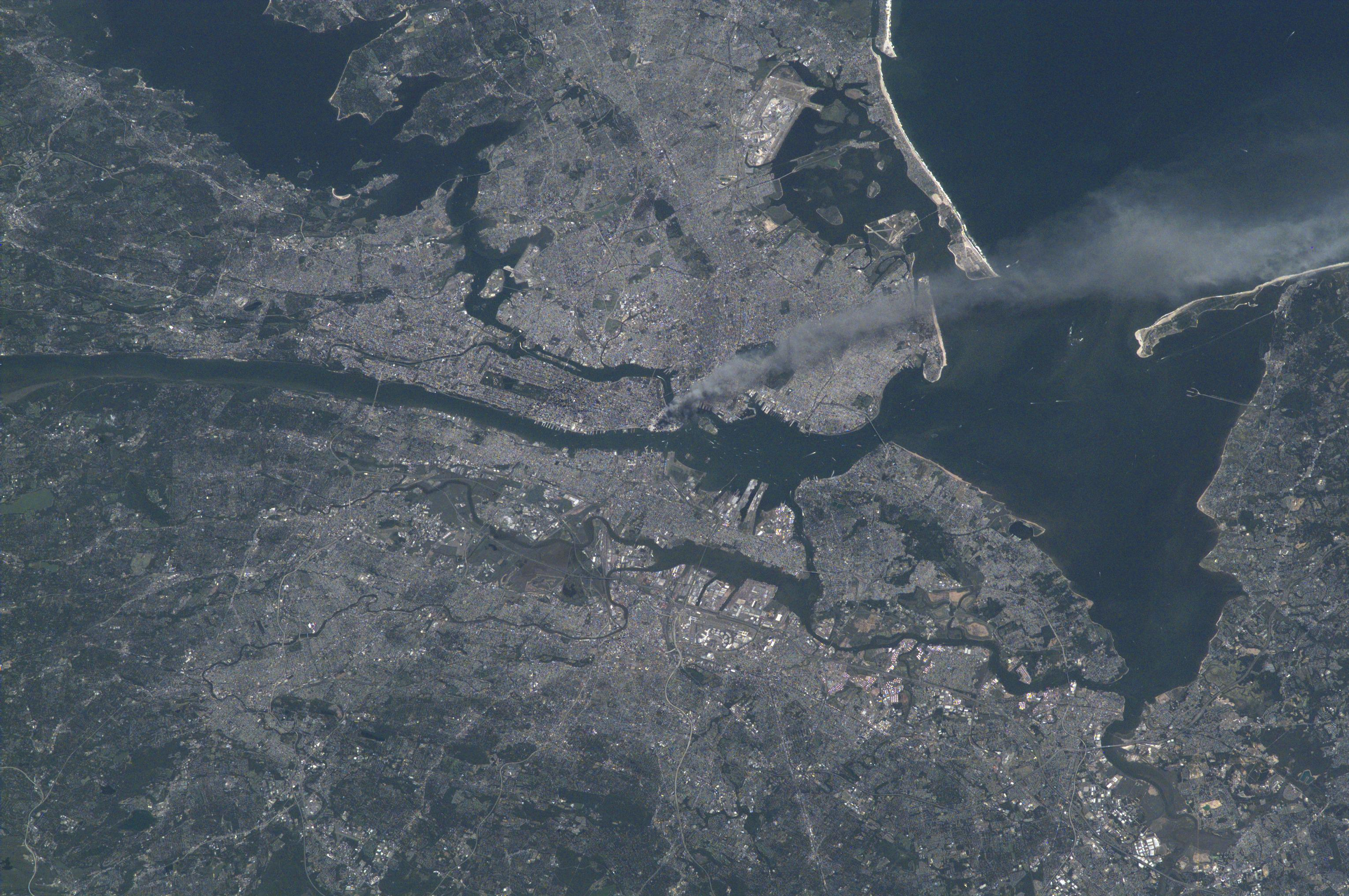
International Space Station image taken on September 11, 2001 showing the smoke plume rising from lower Manhattan and extending over Brooklyn (Expedition 3 crew)

The World Trade Center Health Program (WTC Health Program) provides medical benefits to specific groups of individuals who were affected by the September 11 attacks in 2001 against the United States. The WTC Health Program was established by Title I of the James Zadroga 9/11 Health and Compensation Act (Zadroga Act), P.L. 111-347, which amended the Public Health Service Act. The United States Congress passed the bill in December 2010 and United States President Barack Obama signed it into law on January 2, 2011. The Zadroga Act required the WTC Health Program to begin administering medical benefits on July 1, 2011. On December 18, 2015, the Zadroga Act was reauthorized to provide medical benefits to affected individuals until 2090. The National Institute for Occupational Safety and Health (NIOSH), within the Centers for Disease Control and Prevention, administers the program. The Centers for Disease Control and Prevention is component of the United States Department of Health and Human Services (HHS).

The collapse of the World Trade Center towers on September 11, 2001, (9/11) caused physical hazards as well as massive dust cloud, consisting of pulverized building materials, electronic equipment, and furniture to blanket the World Trade Center site and the surrounding area. Many 9/11 responders, local workers, and resident survivors have since developed respiratory diseases, digestive disorders, cancers, or mental health disorders as a result of these toxic exposures. The WTC Health Program provides screening and treatment for a specific list of 9/11-related conditions.

== History ==
=== 9/11 attacks and aftermath ===
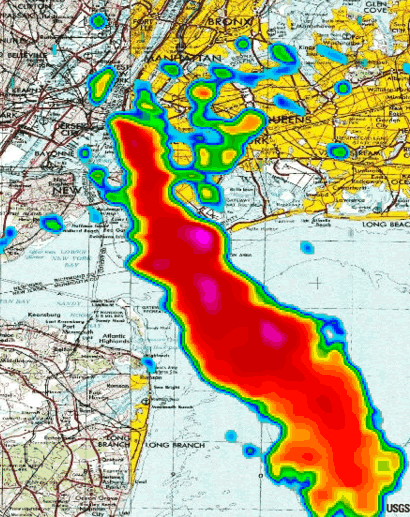
Smoke plume coming from the WTC site, seen on NEXRAD weather radar

On September 11, 2001, 19 terrorists associated with the Islamist militant group al-Qaeda hijacked four passenger jets in a series of suicide attacks on the United States, killing 2,996 people and injuring more than 6,000 others. Hijackers flew planes into two main towers of the World Trade Center, resulting in the collapse of three buildings of the World Trade Center complex, and the Pentagon, resulting in the partial destruction of the western side in the building. The resulting dust cloud due to the collapse of the World Trade Center covered Manhattan for days and contained thousands of tons of toxic debris, including asbestos and other known carcinogens. Another hijacked plane crashed into a field in Shanksville, Pennsylvania, following an attempt by the passengers to retake control of the plane. No one in the airliners survived.

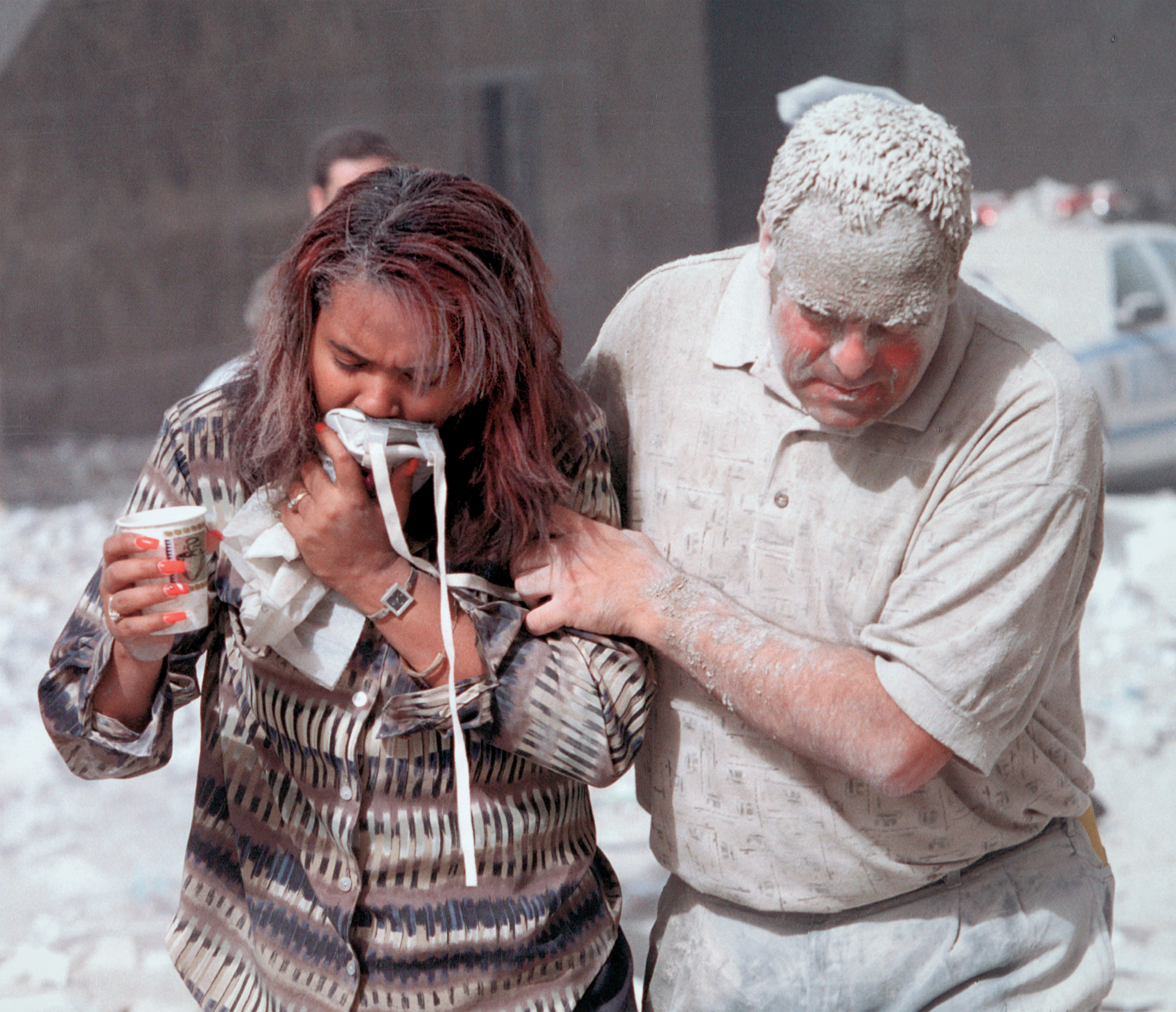
Survivors were covered in dust after the collapse of the towers

As of 2011, approximately 18,000 people have received medical treatment for illnesses related to toxic dust from the World Trade Center site. A study of rescue workers released in April 2010 found that all those studied had impaired lung functions, and that 30–40% were reporting little or no improvement in persistent symptoms that started within the first year of the attack. In 2011 a major research study showed significant long term medical and psychological effects among first responders to the World Trade Center site. These effects include elevated levels of asthma, sinusitis, Gastroesophageal reflux disease and posttraumatic stress disorder.

Residents, students, and office workers of Lower Manhattan and nearby Chinatown have also reported negative health effects. Several deaths have been linked to the toxic dust, and the victims' names have been included in the World Trade Center memorial.

As of 2008, the New York State Department of Health had documented at least 204 deaths of rescue and recovery workers since September 11, 2001. Seventy-seven of these individuals died of illnesses, including 55 from lung and various other cancers. Kitty Gelberg, New York state Bureau of Occupational Health's chief epidemiologist said, "We're not saying they are all World Trade Center related; we're just saying this is what people are dying from." Many of the 55 responders who died from cancer had cancer before September 11, 2001, but most of the cancer patients developed the disease afterward.

=== Pre-Zadroga Act health programs ===
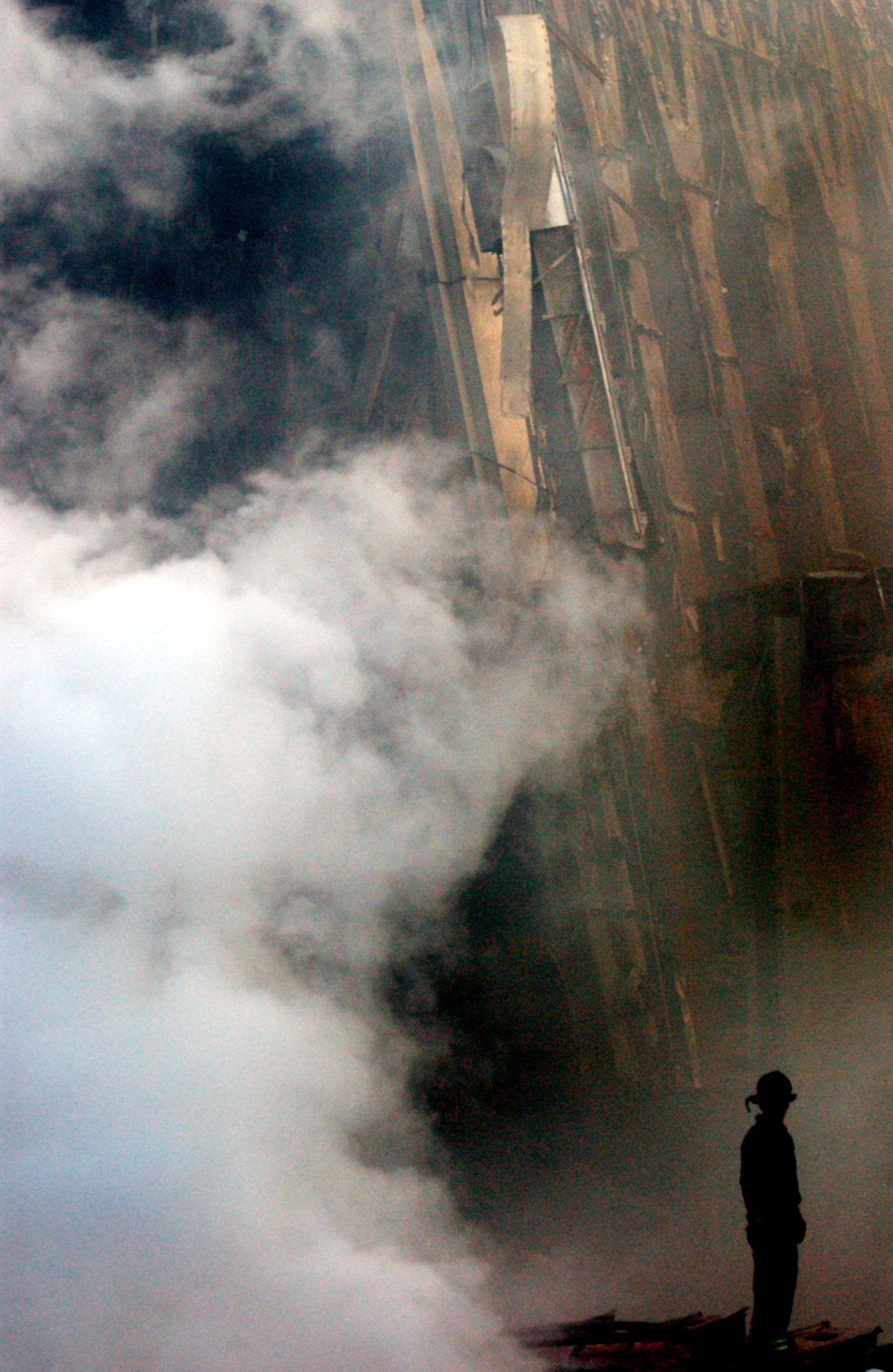
A solitary firefighter stands amid the rubble and smoke in New York City

In 2002, following the 9/11 terrorist attacks, both the National Institute for Occupational Safety and Health and the American Red Cross provided grants to launch the World Trade Center Medical Monitoring and Treatment Program (MMTP) in response to individuals developing health issues related to the disaster. The United States Congress passed appropriations to provide limited health screening and treatment services to World Trade Center responders. The MMTP has received approximately $475 million from the federal government. Over 57,000 people met the program's initial eligibility requirements. On July 1, 2011, MMTP became a part of the World Trade Center Health Program.

The World Trade Center Environmental Health Center (EHC) was also established after the 9/11 terrorist attacks to treat WTC-related illnesses. This program consisted of three locations in and around New York City. On September 30, 2008, the Centers for Disease Control and Prevention (CDC) awarded the New York City Health and Hospitals Corporation (HHC) a grant to be administered by the National Institute for Occupational Safety and Health (NIOSH), to provide health services to non-responder populations in New York City affected by the World Trade Center terrorist attacks. Under the grant, HHC provided medical examinations, diagnostic testing, referral and treatment for residents, students, and others in the community that were directly affected by the dust and debris from the collapse of the World Trade Center buildings on September 11, 2001. Following the passage of the James Zadroga Act, the WTC EHC became part of the WTC Health Program.

In 2002 the Agency for Toxic Substances and Disease Registry and the New York City Health Department launched the World Trade Center Health Registry in collaboration with the National Institute for Occupational Safety and Health. By tracking and investigating illnesses, the WTC Health Registry strives to monitor the health of people exposed to the September 11, 2001 terrorist attacks. The WTC Health Registry continues to release annual reports on new findings regarding the health effects resulting from the terrorist attacks.

On August 14, 2006, then-Governor of New York George Pataki signed legislation to expand death benefits to Ground Zero workers who die from cancer or respiratory diseases, presumably from exposures to hazardous materials and toxins during recovery efforts. At the bill-signing ceremony, held at the World Trade Center site, Pataki mentioned James Zadroga, a New York Police Department officer and 9/11 responder who had fallen ill following the terrorist attacks and died of lung disease in 2006. James Zadroga would become the namesake of the federal bill that created the WTC Health Program in 2011.

=== James L. Zadroga 9/11 Health and Compensation Act ===
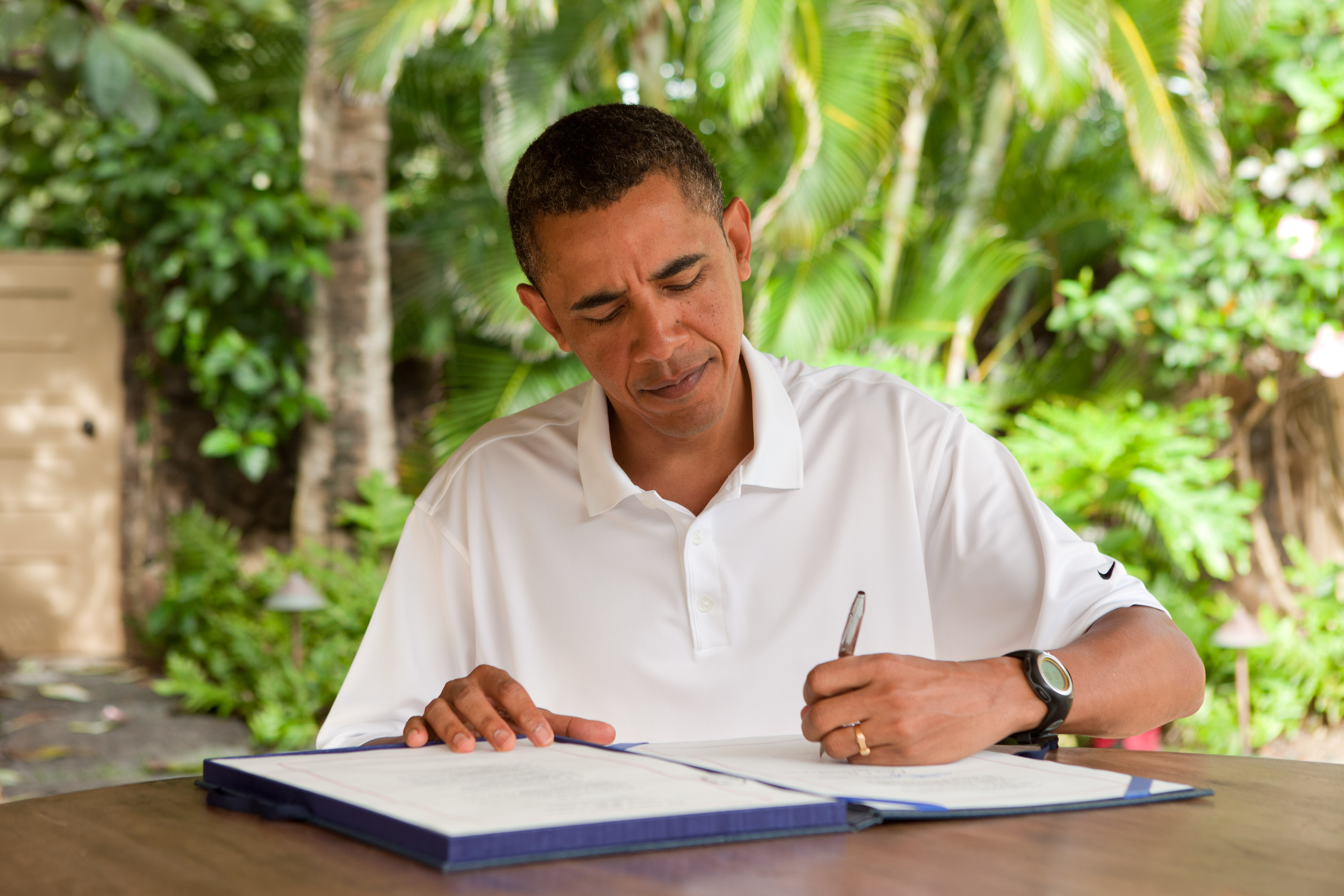
President Obama signing the James L. Zadroga 9/11 Health and Compensation Act of 2010 into law, January 2, 2011 at Plantation Estate in Hawaii.

Originally introduced in 2006 and eventually made law in 2011, the James L. Zadroga 9/11 Health and Compensation Act of 2010 funds and establishes a health program to provide medical treatment for responders and survivors who experienced or may experience health complications related to the 9/11 terrorist attacks. Senator Bob Menendez and Congresswoman Carolyn Maloney initially co-sponsored the bill, which failed to pass in 2006.

The U.S. House passed a new version of the act in September 2010. In a Senate vote held on December 9, 2010, Democrats were unable to break a Republican filibuster against the bill. With only 57 votes to end the Senate filibuster and an incoming influx of Republicans in the wake of the 2010 Congressional Elections, the bill's future looked increasingly doubtful towards the end of 2010.

On December 16, 2010 comedian Jon Stewart dedicated an entire episode of The Daily Show to the political battle over the Zadroga Act. Stewart's coverage of the Republican filibuster raised media awareness of and public support for the bill, drawing praise from politicians and media outlets.

On December 19, 2010, New York Senators Chuck Schumer and Kirsten Gillibrand introduced a $6.2 billion version of the bill paid for in part by closing a corporate tax loophole and in part by a 2% excise tax on foreign goods that did not include countries with international procurement agreements with the U.S. On December 22, 2010, Congress approved the final bill, which allocated $4.2 billion towards the program, and President Barack Obama signed the Zadroga Act into law on January 2, 2011. This act created the World Trade Center Health Program, which replaced earlier programs (Medical Monitoring and Treatment Program and the WTC Environmental Health Center program).

=== Cuts under second Trump administration ===
In February 2025, the Department of Government Efficiency (DOGE) established by the second Donald Trump administration announced a reduction of research funding and 20% cut of jobs in the WTC Health Program. The issue caused backlash from both Democrats and Republicans, as the cut would put the health of 9/11 first responders at risk.

After the backlash from Republicans, the funding cuts have been reversed but it is unclear whether the job positions in the WTC Health Program will be rehired. Benjamin Chevat, executive director at Citizens for Extension of the James Zadroga Act, commented on the negative impact of the cut, “We know that members of the program have been adversely impacted by these cuts already, since one staffer terminated was in charge of cancer certifications for the program, which means that there must be growing delays in cancer certifications, delaying care."

Overall, the program has ceased to function normally since Trump took office in 2025, with communications failures, staffing losses, and halts in research all continuing to take place under the oversight of Secretary of Health and Human Services Robert F. Kennedy Jr. as of September 11, 2025.

== Eligibility ==
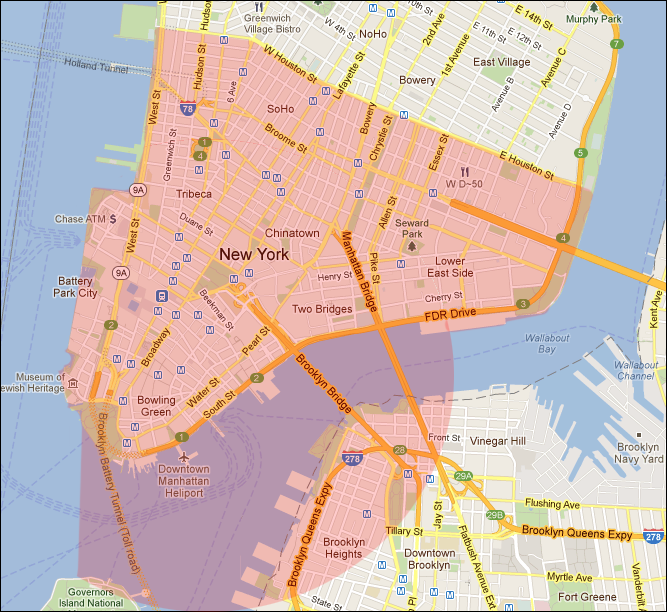
The World Trade Center disaster area

The WTC Health Program covers responders who worked or volunteered in the rescue, recovery, or clean up efforts at the World Trade Center site in New York, the Pentagon, or the plane crash site in Shanksville, Pennsylvania. It also provides benefits for people who lived, worked, went to school, attended daycare, or adult daycare in the New York City disaster area after September 11. Responders include members of the Fire Department of New York City who participated in the rescue and recovery effort at the World Trade Center sites, as well as other workers, law enforcement officers, and volunteers who participated in the 9/11 response efforts in New York City. Also included are members of fire and police departments, other workers and volunteers who responded to the 9/11 terrorist attacks at the Pentagon or in Shanksville, PA.

New York City responders include active or retired members of the Fire Department of New York City (whether fire or emergency personnel); Police Department of New York City (whether active or retired); Port Authority Police of the Port Authority of New York and New Jersey; employees of the Office of the Chief Medical Examiner of New York City and other morgue workers involved in handling human remains; workers in the Port Authority Trans-Hudson Corporate Tunnel; vehicle maintenance workers exposed to debris; and other workers or volunteers who assisted in the rescue, recovery, debris cleanup or related services. Members of the New York City Fire Department must have participated in the rescue and recovery effort at any of the former World Trade Center sites (including Ground Zero, Staten Island Landfill, and the New York City Chief Medical Examiner’s Office). Other workers and volunteers must have responded in lower Manhattan, including Ground Zero, the Staten Island Landfill, or the barge loading piers.

The program also provides medical treatment for survivors who were present in the New York City Disaster Area in the aftermath of the 9/11 terrorist attacks because of work, residence, or attendance at school, child care, or adult day care. Survivors also include individuals who happened to be present in this area on 9/11. The New York City Disaster Area includes the area of Manhattan south of Houston Street, as well as any block of Brooklyn either wholly or partially contained within a 1.5-mile radius of the former World Trade Center site. The program recognized the musicians, including Marya Columbia, who played for rescuers in lower Manhattan as eligible as well.

== Conditions covered by the WTC Health Program ==
The WTC Health Program only provides tests and treatment for conditions specified by law in the Zadroga Act or certified by the WTC Program Administrator, who is the Director of the National Institute for Occupational Safety and Health. These include respiratory and digestive disorders and mental health conditions, as well as secondary conditions related to disease progression or complication from treatment of the primary covered health condition. Additionally, certain musculoskeletal disorders are covered for Fire Department of New York members and other responders injured in the response to the terrorist attacks. As of June 2019, the 10 most common conditions certified by the World Trade Center Health Program were chronic rhinosinusitis, gastroesophageal reflux disease (GERD), asthma, sleep apnea, cancer, posttraumatic stress disorder (PTSD), chronic respiratory disease, chronic obstructive pulmonary disease (COPD), depression, and anxiety disorders. The most common cancers were skin cancer and prostate cancer.

=== Cancers and possible additions ===
The Zadroga Act established a process whereby the Administrator of the WTC Health Program may consider petitions by interested parties to add new conditions to the list of those covered by the WTC Health Program. In June 2012, Administrator Dr. John Howard proposed adding certain types of cancer as recommended by the WTC Health Program Scientific/Technical Advisory Committee, in a Notice of Proposed Rulemaking. Many types of cancer were officially added to the coverage list in 2012–2014.

== WTC Health Program clinics ==
There are several WTC Health Program clinic locations in the New York City area.

Clinics for 9/11 responders include:

- Northwell Health
- Rutgers University
- Icahn School of Medicine at Mount Sinai
- New York University School of Medicine
- State University of New York

Survivors can receive testing and treatment through the NYC Health + Hospitals WTC Environmental Health Center at three locations:

- Bellevue Hospital Center
- Elmhurst Hospital Center
- Gouverneur Healthcare Services

FDNY members can receive monitoring and treatment at:

- FDNY Headquarters
- Brentwood, Long Island (Mental Health)
- Commack (Physical Health)
- Fort Totten, Queens
- Manhattan (Mental Health)
- Middletown
- Staten Island

More information can be found on the FDNY WTC Health Program Website

Eligible responders and survivors who are no longer living in the New York City area can receive care through the Nationwide Provider Network, which is national network of healthcare providers associated with WTC Health Program. More information can be found on their website.

== Data centers ==
There are three data centers that are responsible for collecting, managing and analyzing the health data generated from the medical program.

The data center for 9/11 responder clinics is housed at Icahn School of Medicine at Mount Sinai. The FDNY houses a data center for its health program. And the survivor clinics have a data center at the NYC Health + Hospitals WTC Environmental Health Center.

== Pentagon and Shanksville, Pennsylvania 9/11 responders ==
The James Zadroga 9/11 Health and Compensation Act also provides monitoring and treatment for eligible responders to the 9/11 attacks at the Pentagon and in Shanksville, Pennsylvania who have, or may have, a covered health condition relating to the 9/11 attacks.
