= Kari Nadeau =

American Physician and scientist

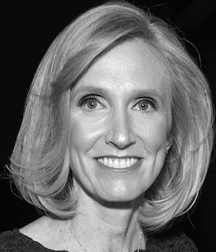
- Education: Haverford College; Harvard University
- Known for: Environmental Health & Disease
- Scientific career
- Fields: Allergy / Immunology / Asthma; Exposomics; Environmental Health; Clinical Trials
- Workplaces: UCLA Harvard University Stanford University
- Thesis: Biochemical studies on protein folding chaperones : Hsp90 and cyclophilin; and, On trypanosomal enzymes : trypanothione and glutationylspermidine synthetases (1995)
- Doctoral advisor: Christopher T. Walsh

Kari C. Nadeau is an American physician-scientist and academic specializing in allergy, asthma, immunology, and exposomics. She is dean of the UCLA Fielding School of Public Health (2026 - present) and the former John Rock Professor of Extreme Weather and Population Studies and chair of the Department of Environmental Health at the Harvard T.H. Chan School of Public Health. She is an adjunct professor at the Harvard T.H. Chan School of Public Health. She is also an adjunct clinical professor of pediatrics at Stanford University. Nadeau maintains a clinical practice in allergy, asthma, and immunology for adults and children across multiple institutions.

She is a member of the National Academy of Medicine, the WHO Air Pollution and Health Scientific Advisory Group (SAG) and the U.S. EPA Children's Health Protection Committee.

== Education ==
After graduating from Haverford College with a degree in biology, Nadeau attended Harvard Medical School via the Medical Scientist Training Program (NIH), and received a PhD in biological chemistry and molecular pharmacology and an MD in 1995. She then started an internship and residency in pediatrics. From 1998 to 2002, she worked in the field of biopharmaceuticals and led clinical research to obtain FDA approval for two biologics in the field of Autoimmunity and Oncology, respectively. From 2003 to 2006, Nadeau was a resident and a fellow in Asthma, Allergy, and Immunology. She also did a postdoctoral fellowship in human immune tolerance mechanisms in asthma and allergy.

== Career ==
Nadeau began her academic career at Stanford University, where from 2002 to 2005 she served as a Clinical Instructor for Physical Examination in the General Pediatrics division of the School of Medicine. She advanced to Instructor in the Department of Pediatrics from 2006 to 2008 and, in parallel, became a faculty member of the Stanford Institute of Immunity, Transplantation, and Infectious Disease, as well as the Multidisciplinary Program in Immunology at the School of Medicine. In 2008 she was appointed Assistant Professor of Pediatrics in the Division of Immunology and Allergy, along with a courtesy appointment as Assistant Professor of Otolaryngology. Between 2020 and 2023, she received a courtesy appointment as Professor of Epidemiology in the Department of Epidemiology and Population Health, and from 2021 to 2023 she was affiliated with the Wu Tsai Neurosciences Institute.

In 2023, Nadeau joined the Harvard T.H. Chan School of Public Health as the John Rock Professor and chair of the Department of Environmental Health. She also became a professor of medicine at Harvard Medical School in 2024, while retaining her role as adjunct clinical professor of pediatrics at Stanford University. At Harvard, she directed an interdisciplinary program integrating environmental exposures research with immunology, clinical medicine, and public health.

On July 1, 2026, Nadeau began her tenure as eighth dean of the UCLA Fielding School of Public Health.

== Research ==
Nadeau's research spans the intersections of environmental exposures, immunology, allergy, and clinical intervention. Her work integrates exposomics—the comprehensive study of lifetime environmental exposures—with immunologic and epigenetic analysis, focusing on public health, pediatric allergy, and climate-related health challenges. She has combined basic laboratory science with clinical studies and policy engagement, aiming to translate mechanistic insights into improved prevention, diagnosis, and treatment strategies for environmentally-mediated diseases.

=== Environmental Exposures, Extreme weather and Immunity ===
Her research examines wildfire smoke, air pollution, microplastics, and other climate-driven exposures, with a focus on high-risk populations such as children, pregnant individuals, first responders, and underserved communities. Over more than three decades, she has studied how environmental and epigenetic factors contribute to immune dysfunction, incorporating exposomics to evaluate the cumulative effects of multiple exposures over time in adults, children, and pregnant women

=== Food Allergy Mechanisms and Clinical Trials ===
A major component of Nadeau's research has focused on the prevention and treatment of food allergies. While at Stanford, she directed the Sean N. Parker Center for Allergy and Asthma Research, where she led clinical trials in oral immunotherapy aimed at inducing immune tolerance, particularly in children at risk for single and multiple food allergies. Among these efforts was the phase 2 POISED study, which evaluated sustained unresponsiveness in patients who had completed peanut oral immunotherapy and were monitored for immune biomarkers and long-term outcomes.

=== Cellular and Epigenetic Mechanisms of Immune Tolerance ===
Nadeau's translational studies have examined how immune cell populations change in response to therapeutic interventions. Her team has characterized the differentiation of CD8⁺ T cells associated with tolerance induction following oral immunotherapy, work published in Nature Communications. She has also documented epigenetic methylation changes in genes such as IL4, IL10, and IFNγ, linked to air pollution exposure during pregnancy.

In parallel, she has investigated how particulate air pollutants can alter monocyte polarization and promote "trained immunity" in the context of asthma, identifying potential pathways through which environmental exposures exacerbate disease severity.

=== Systems and Population-Level Immune Responses ===
Beyond cellular mechanisms, Nadeau has contributed to large-scale studies examining how environmental exposures affect health at the population level. Her research has included mapping associations between pollutant exposure and cardiovascular risk markers, such as blood pressure in adolescents, and analyzing the cellular environment of the lung in chronic obstructive pulmonary disease using single-cell RNA sequencing. She has also participated in international collaborations on the development of World Health Organization air quality guidelines, incorporating immunological evidence into public health recommendations.

Additional publications have addressed the growing burden of allergic disease in the context of extreme weather, including the implications of longer pollen seasons, increased particulate air pollution, heat waves, and biodiversity loss on respiratory and allergic conditions worldwide.

== Training others ==
Nadeau is on the Education Council of Harvard Medical School and on the Board of Managers of Haverford College.

== Policy ==
Nadeau's work extends into the interface of science and policy. Her laboratory regularly engages with policymakers to share evidence on wildfire mitigation, air quality management, and the health impacts of environmental exposures.

She has served on advisory committees for organizations such as the National Academy of Medicine, the World Health Organization's Scientific Advisory Group on Air Pollution and Health, and the U.S. Environmental Protection Agency's Children's Health Protection Advisory Committee. Through these roles, she provides scientific expertise to guide national and international strategies for reducing the health risks posed by environmental and climate-related factors.

=== Honors and awards ===
- 2006 Parker B. Francis Fellowship to Faculty Award
- 2008 American Academy of Allergy, Asthma, and Immunology (AAAAI) Award for Junior Faculty
- 2008 McCormick Award, Stanford University School of Medicine
- 2010 Environmental Protection Agency (EPA) STAR Grant Award
- 2010 Elected to Collegium Internationale Allergologicum (CIA)
- 2014 Distinguished Lecture Award, NIEHS Annual Distinguished Lecture
- 2015 Elected into American Society of Clinical Investigation (ASCI)
- 2018 Chairman, Gordon Research Conference, Food Allergy
- 2019 Senior Fellow, Stanford Woods Institute for the Environment
- 2022 Elected into the National Academy of Medicine
- 2023 Paul Ehrlich International Award for Research

Nadeau and her work have made a number of media appearances supporting food allergy awareness and research:

- New York Times, The Allergy Buster
- CNN, Funding a cure for food allergies
- Huffington Post,
- 60 Minutes, Allergy Free
- NBC News, Food Allergy Treatments for Children Show Promise
- Forbes, How Giving Children Foods They Are Allergic To Can Cure Them, And Other Provocative Approaches In Evolutionary Medicine
- PBS Newshour, Retraining the body to lift the life sentence of food allergies
- US News, New Hope for Kids With Multiple Food Allergies
- CBS Boston, HealthWatch: New Treatment To Help Kids With Multiple Food Allergies
- TEDxPaloAlto, Let's Focus on Food Allergy Prevention
- After On podcast, Episode 46 - Dr. Kari Nadeau - Defeating food allergy
- Today show, A peanut allergy cure? Big news on new treatments for 6 million kids
- Today show, Allergy prevention: The fascinating method parents are turning to.
- TEDx – Planetary Stewardship
