= Stringfellow Acid Pits =

Superfund site

- Superfund site
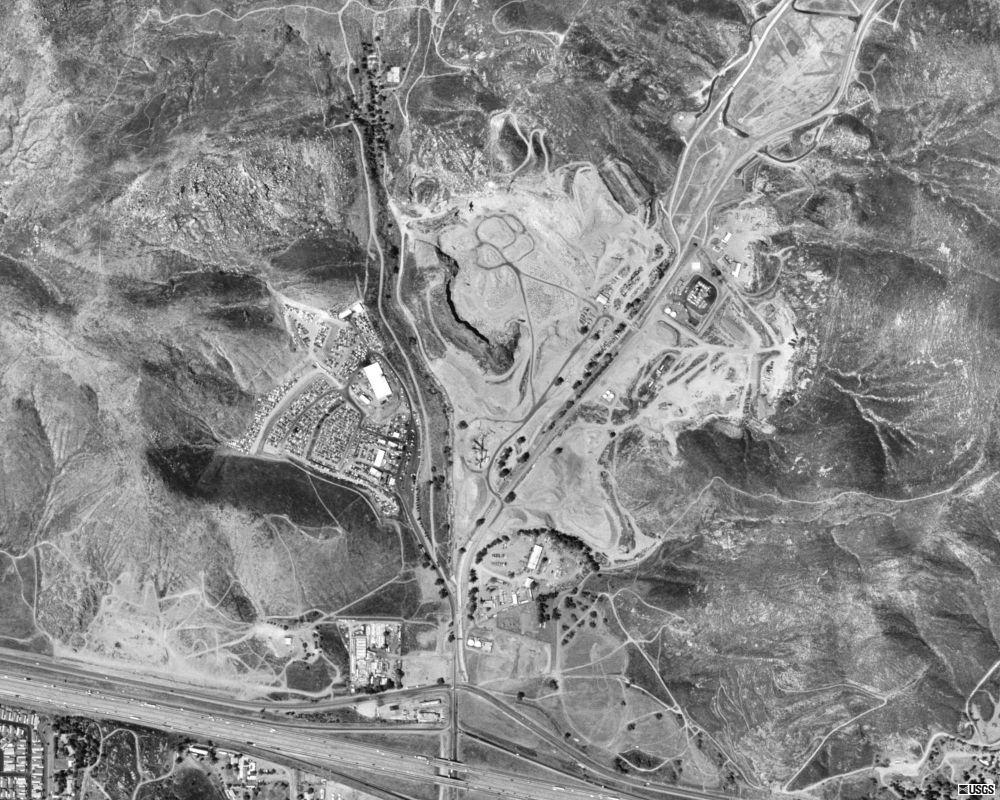
- USGS satellite photo of the Stringfellow Acid Pits located north of California State Route 60.

- Location within California
- Location: Jurupa Valley, California, Riverside, California; 34°01′24″N 117°27′39″W

Information
- CERCLIS ID: CAT080012826
- Contaminants: VOCs, Heavy metals, Perchlorate, Pesticide, PCBs, Sulfates
- Responsible parties: California Department of Toxic Substances Control

Progress
- Proposed: December 30, 1982
- Listed: September 8, 1983

The Stringfellow Acid Pits are a toxic waste dump and Superfund site located in Jurupa Valley, California, United States, just north of the neighborhood of Glen Avon.

The site became the center of national news coverage in the early 1980s, in part because it was considered one of the most polluted sites in California, and because it became linked with mismanagement and scandal in the U.S. Environmental Protection Agency. Rita Lavelle was convicted of perjury and Anne Gorsuch Burford resigned.

== Background ==
Situated at the base of the Jurupa Mountains in Pyrite Canyon, the 17-acre (69,000 m^{2}) site was originally a rock quarry owned by James Stringfellow. The resulting valley seemed a perfect disposal site for toxic waste. In 1956, after a year long negotiations, and at the request of the Santa Ana Regional Water Quality Control Board (RWQCB), Stringfellow opened the site for dumping toxic waste. Included in the negotiations was Stringfellow receiving assurances from a geologist who deemed the site safe for dumping. The geologic survey claimed that the solid bedrock made the valley an ideal and safe site for waste.

In 1972, after it became apparent that the pits were leaking into local groundwater, RWQCB shut down the site. During the facility's 16 years of operation, more than 34 million gallons of liquid industrial waste was deposited in evaporation ponds. Stringfellow claimed his company was without assets, and title to the land passed to the State of California, with oversight given to the Santa Ana River Water Quality Board. Between 1969 and 1980, poor weather and management resulted in several spills and intentional releases of toxic chemicals into Pyrite Creek, which flowed into storm channels running through Glen Avon.

== As a Superfund site ==
In the early 1980s, after the passage of the Comprehensive Environmental Response, Compensation and Liability Act, or Superfund, the site came to the attention of the US Environmental Protection Agency. It was listed as the most contaminated site in California, and was one of the first sites selected for remediation under the Act. The severity of the problems and a subsequent scandal related to the site made the acid pits the subject of national television coverage.

Penny Newman was a local activist who fought to get it listed as a Superfund site.

Currently, the Stringfellow Site is managed by the California Department of Toxic Substances Control (DTSC). According to DTSC, the cleanup effort will take approximately 500 years.

=== Rita Lavelle ===
Rita Lavelle, appointed director of the Superfund in 1982 by President Ronald Reagan, was convicted on federal charges of perjury related to an investigation into misuse of the United States Environmental Protection Agency's (EPA) Superfund money during her tenure with the Agency, and irregularities at the Stringfellow Acid Pits. The Lavelle incident was labeled "Sewergate."

Anne Gorsuch Burford resigned as EPA Administrator amid the controversy.

=== Litigation ===
The litigation involved with the Stringfellow site resulted in numerous lawsuits, including the United States v. Stringfellow case in federal court, the Newman v. Stringfellow personal injury case in Riverside Superior Court, and the Hendler v. United States case before the U.S. Court of Federal Claims and the U.S. Court for the Federal Circuit. The U.S. Supreme Court also decided one issue in Stringfellow v. Concerned Neighbors in Action, 480 U.S. 370 (1987). The subsequent insurance litigation lasted well into the 21st century. In total, the litigation spanned more than three decades.

== See also ==
- List of Superfund sites in California
- Penny Newman
