= List of EPA whistleblowers =

The United States Environmental Protection Agency has had numerous whistleblowers.

Year	Name	Action
1983	Hugh Kaufman	
1994	William Marcus	As a Senior Science Advisor for the Environmental Protection Agency (EPA), Marcus witnessed the Office of Drinking Water approve a policy that added fluoride to the nation's drinking water. Marcus was fired after he reported the fluoride could increase cancer rates in the affected population. His testimony led to the discovery of numerous frauds committed by major chemical companies who tried to silence his concerns. Marcus prevailed in front of an Administrative Law Judge and was reinstated with full back pay, as well as a large compensatory damage reward.
1995	William Sanjour	William Sanjour worked for the Environmental Protection Agency (EPA) for over 25 years, where he constantly challenged the safety practices of the agency and ensured the EPA properly dealt with hazardous waste. In 1995, Sanjour won a landmark lawsuit that set a nationwide precedent and First Amendment right permitting federal employees to blow the whistle on their employers. In Sanjour v. EPA, he challenged agency rules restricting EPA employees from talking to environmental groups, a decision that has not been overruled to this day. Sanjour was the recipient of the 2007 Association of Certified Fraud Examiners (ACFE) Sentinel Award, which recognizes those who "choose truth over self."
2000	Paul Jayko	Paul Jayko was an Environmental Specialist for the Ohio Environmental Protection Agency. In 1997, when Jayko was assigned as a site coordinator for River Valley Schools area, he discovered that school buildings were built on a site of a former military installation, where carcinogenic materials were buried and disposed. When he attempted to investigate the link between the site and the increased incidence of leukemia in the area, Jayko gradually lost his responsibilities and was ultimately terminated. Later, the manager responsible for retaliation against Jayko lost his bid to become Director Enforcement for the U.S. Environmental Protection Agency, in large part due to the finding by the judge in the Jayko case that the head of the Ohio's EPA personally retaliated against Mr. Jayko.
2000	Marsha Coleman-Adebayo	Marsha Coleman-Adebayo was a Senior Policy Analyst in the Office of the Administrator at the U.S. Environmental Protection Agency (EPA). She blew the whistle on the EPA for racial and gender discrimination in violation of Civil Rights Act of 1964 which began after she was removed from her position in South Africa where her "job was to essentially help the South African government to work on issues that impact public health". In South Africa she brought to the attention of the EPA the dangerous conditions an American company was exposing African workers who were mining to vanadium, a dangerous substance. Her case eventually led to the passing of the No-FEAR Act in 2002 that makes federal agencies more accountable for employee complaints.
2002	David Lewis	Dr. David Lewis was a senior research microbiologist with the U.S. Environmental Protection Agency. His research assessing the link between human health and use of treated sewage sludge prompted the Centers for Disease Control to issue guidelines protecting workers handling treated sewage sludge. Dr. Lewis published an article criticizing the EPA's sludge rule in 1999.
2006	Cate Jenkins	Cate Jenkins informed the EPA Inspector General, U.S. Congress, and FBI about hazardous particulate matter in the dust from the September 11 attacks. In 2006, she went to The New York Times and said that the EPA intentionally hid from responders and the public the danger of the dust at 9/11; the dust caused chemical burns in the lungs of two-thirds of responders that could have been prevented with proper safety equipment. Jenkins was fired from her job in 2010 after harassment from her superiors. In 2012, she successfully sued to be reinstated.
2018	Ruth Etzel	
2018	Elizabeth "Betsy" Southerland	
2018	Deborah Swackhamer	
2018	Kevin Chmielewski	
