= Rubber Chicken Man =

Washington Nationals baseball fan and EPA whistleblower

Hugh Kaufman
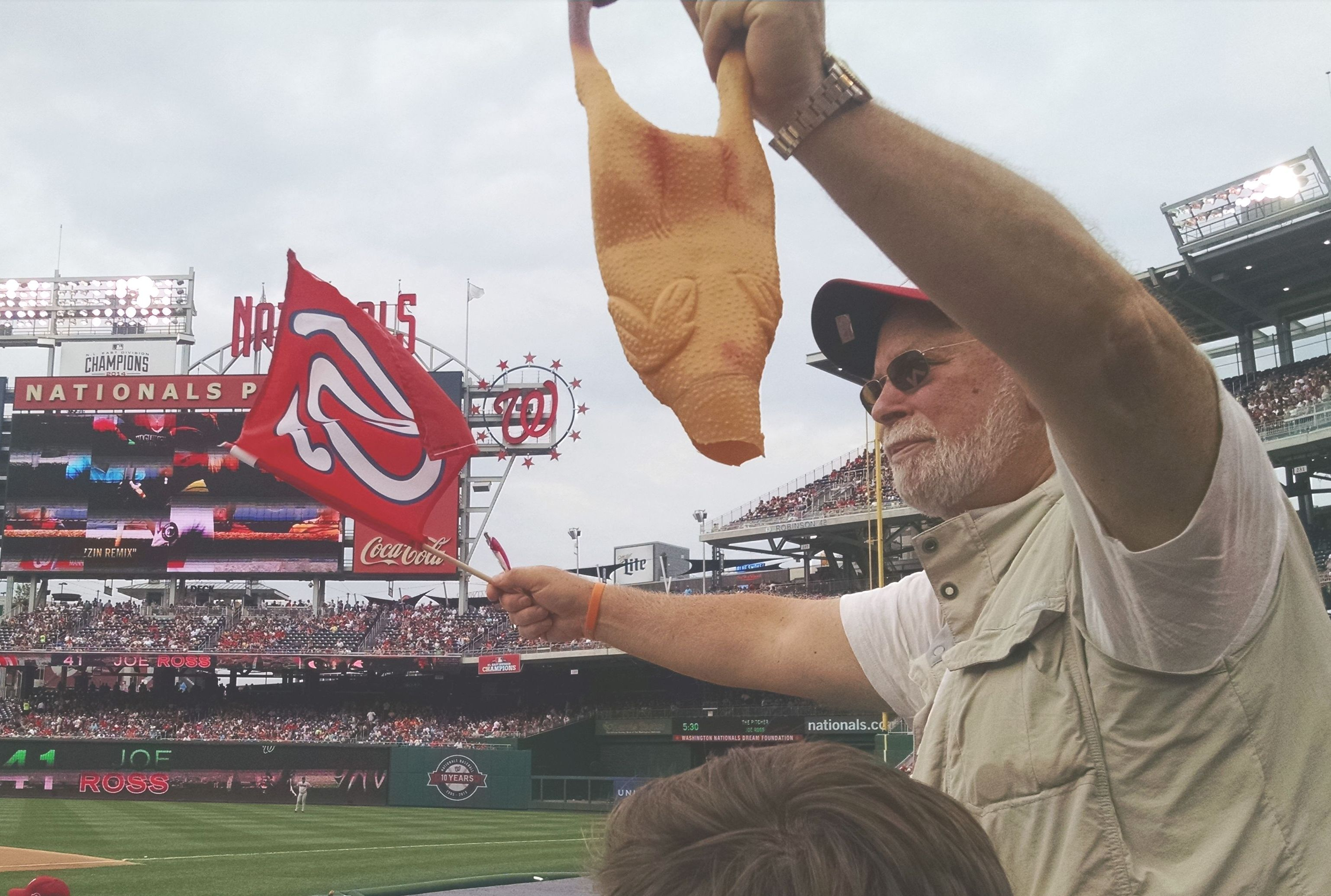
- Born: January 14, 1943 (age 83); Washington, D.C., U.S.
- Other name: "Rubber Chicken Man"
- Occupation: EPA engineer
- Known for: Waving rubber chicken over Nationals dugout

Hugh Kaufman (born January 14, 1943), better known as the Rubber Chicken Man, is a Washington Nationals baseball fan who can be seen at most games at Nationals Park waving a rubber chicken over the Nationals dugout to ward off bad "juju" or bad luck. Sports reporters writing for The Washington Post have written about his giving chicken soup to struggling Nats players to improve their play and that his ritual "sacrificing" of chickens often seems to precede turnarounds in the Nationals' performance.

As an employee of the Environmental Protection Agency, Kaufman has repeatedly been a whistleblower, including matters relating to the Rita Lavelle convictions and the post-9-11 cleanup of Ground Zero.

== Early life ==
Kaufman was born January 14, 1943, in Washington, D.C., to Milton and Lillie Kaufman. There, he became a fan of the old Washington Senators. His father was a mathematician in the Department of Commerce. He continues his father's tradition of keeping box score statistics of each game.

Kaufman got a master's degree in engineering administration from George Washington University.

Kaufman served in the Air Force from 1965 to 1971, leaving as a captain.

== Environmental Protection Agency ==
Kaufman joined the Environmental Protection Agency (EPA) in 1971.

=== Superfund, Anne Gorsuch, and Rita Lavelle ===
Kaufman was one of the authors of the Comprehensive Environmental Response, Compensation, and Liability Act of 1980, more commonly known as Superfund.

Kaufman turned whistleblower on Anne Gorsuch's actions with Superfund money to a Senate subcommittee.

Rita Lavelle ordered an investigation of Kaufman in order to get him fired.

She stated in a December 16, 1983 Senate hearing that she never ordered an investigation nor stated a desire to fire Kaufman. However, this was contradicted by other documents produced. She was later found guilty of perjury. Kaufman testified against Lavelle in her trial.

"I feel her sentence was fair for the crimes charged, but I also feel she was made the scapegoat," stated Kaufman. "She was the lowest-level official involved and it was done to deflect attention away from the real issues and real crimes."

=== Hurricane Katrina ===
The EPA stated that "Hugh Kaufman is welcome to speak as a citizen. But he does not speak for the agency," in regards to his speaking on Katrina.

Kaufman "suggested" that the Bush Administration was putting pressure on the EPA to not release information about the environmental impacts of the 2005 Hurricane Katrina.

He also claimed that lax enforcement of environmental precautions led to extremely toxic floodwater.

"You have a tremendous amount of water that contains sewage, industrial wastewater, hazardous materials, oil, gas, a whole host of hazardous materials that has inundated the whole New Orleans area that has to be dealt with."

— Kaufman, Voice of America News

He stated that the best thing to do with the toxic floodwater was to "send all that material into the Gulf of Mexico." However, water was pumped into Lake Pontchartrain and the Mississippi River, a decision Kaufman criticized for possibly endangering people downstream.

Additionally, he criticized the lack of personal protective equipment and training for workers and citizens, due to the high levels of mold and asbestos; he believed that many would get cancer as a result. He stated that this was occurring due to incompetence and a disconnect between decision-makers and experts.

=== Use of Corexit to clean Deepwater Horizon Oil Spill ===
Kaufman claimed that the use of Corexit to clean up the 2010 Deepwater Horizon oil spill was known to the EPA to be dangerous; Corexit has been found to have more negative effects on marine life than oil and to cause adverse health effects in humans. He claimed that the EPA is attempting to both claim that Corexit is safer than oil and that they don't know enough about Corexit to regulate it.

Kaufman that "the only real purpose of [BP] using so many dispersants with the oil was to cover up the volume of oil that was released from that well. So, that and lying about how much is coming out was a mechanism to help BP save billions of dollars in fines."

"What's going on in the Gulf is the same cover up that was going with the 9/11 environmental issue," said Kaufman.

== Sports ==
According to a Topps baseball card issued for Rubber Chicken Man, in 2005 "a rubber chicken was sacrificed over the dugout and the team played over .500 after that point. The team likes the tradition, so every year he sacrifices a rubber chicken.

That same year, Nats slugger José Guillén was struggling and apparently needed surgery. Kaufman gave him a serving of his Jewish grandmother's chicken soup from a 19th century Hungarian recipe. "By the 7th or 8th inning, he was feeling better," Kaufman recalled to a Washington Post reporter. "He went in the game, and he scored the winning run."

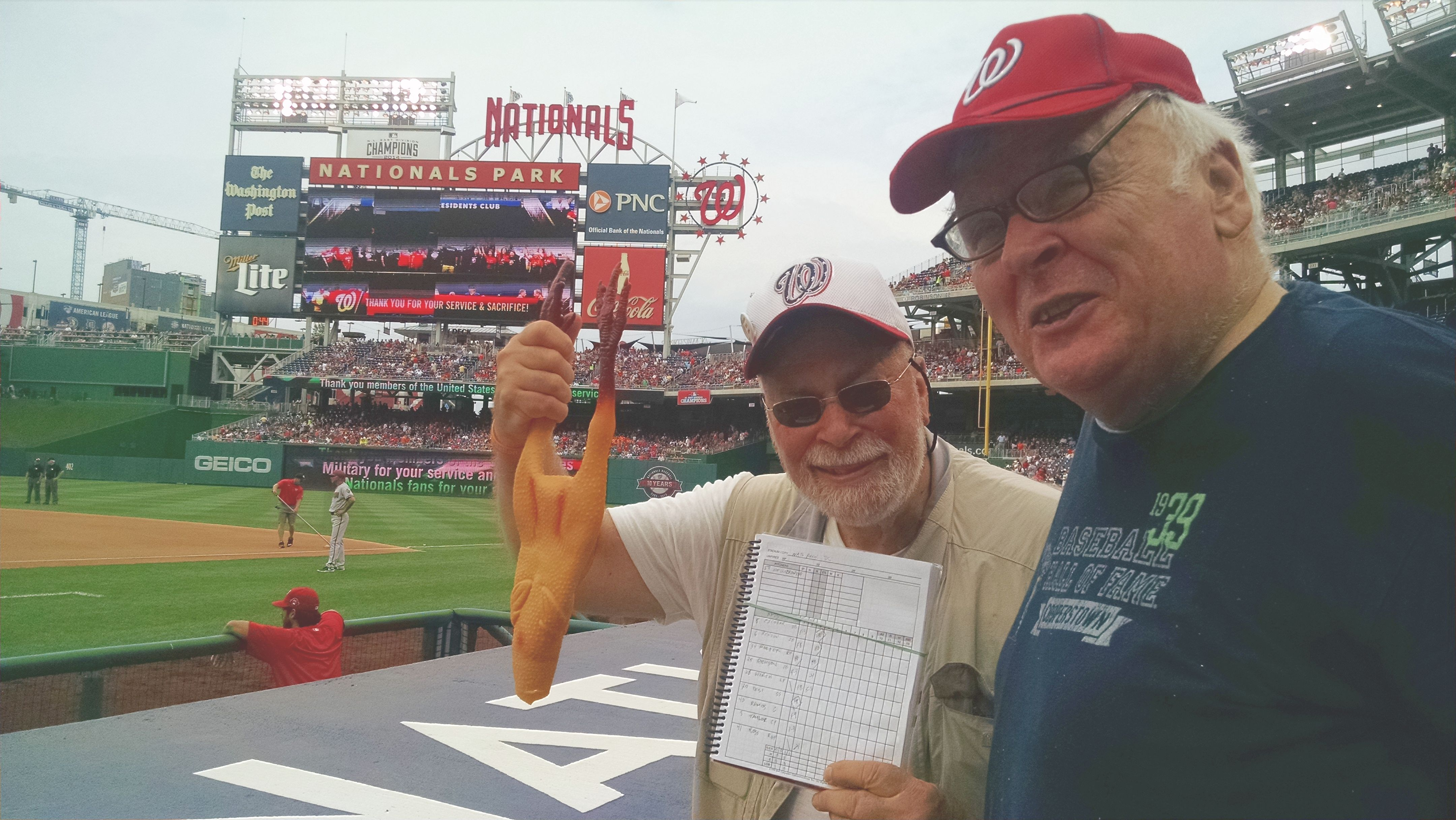
"Rubber Chicken Man" Hugh Kaufman compares notes on the Washington Nationals with baseball writer Paul Dickson.

In May 2012, when the Nationals were a slump, Nats manager Davey Johnson was asked whether the team was "snakebitten" after several injuries. "There's been superstitions, to change our luck and do different kinds of things. Sacrifice a chicken or something," Johnson replied.

Kaufman answered Johnson's call by sacrificing a rubber chicken outside the stadium, as he had done numerous times over the previous ten years. "I think Davey has recognized the whole history of baseball Voodoo," he told a local baseball blogger.

Kaufman follows the orthodox Jewish tradition of Kaporos, in which chickens were ritually sacrificed before Yom Kippur. "This is an offshoot of that," Kaufman told the writer before pulling out his butcher knife. "That's where you transfer the sins to the animal, and so if there are any hidden sins in that Nats locker room, Cool Heat or something like that, that gets transferred to the chicken so when you take the head off, that gets rid of the bad Juju."

In the summer of 2014, the Nationals began a successful run to win the Eastern Division title. On June 11, Washington Post reporter Neil Greenberg wrote that they had "brought their record to 9–3 since fans sacrificed a rubber chicken. Yes, you read that right."

== See also ==
- Paul the Octopus
- List of EPA whistleblowers
