= Rita Lavelle =

American political official and consultant

Rita Marie Lavelle (born September 8, 1947) is a United States and California State Republican political figure. In 1984, Lavelle was convicted on federal charges of perjury related to an investigation into misuse of the United States Environmental Protection Agency's "Superfund" money during her tenure with the agency, and irregularities at the Stringfellow Acid Pits, a major hazardous waste site. The Lavelle incident was labeled "Sewergate" or "Garbagegate" by the newspapers at the time.

In 2004, Lavelle was convicted again on unrelated federal charges of one count of wire fraud and two counts of making false statements to the FBI. Lavelle committed these crimes in her NuTECH Enterprises, Inc. business of environmental consultation.

== Biography ==
Lavelle was born in Portsmouth, Virginia, to Dr. Patrick Lavelle and Rita Lavelle. In 1969, Lavelle earned her bachelor's degree in Biology and Mathematics, with a minor in chemistry, from Holy Names University in Oakland, California. She continued her graduate work at the University of California, Berkeley in physiological chemistry and stoichiometry. She earned a master's degree cum laude in business administration from Pepperdine University in 1980.

From 1969 to 1976, she was the California State Consumer Affairs Department information officer, state director of consumer education, and publications assistant in the office of then-Governor Ronald Reagan. She was director of marketing for Intercontinental and Continental Chemical Corporation in Sacramento, California, from 1976 to 1978. Lavelle's responsibilities included development of corporate guidelines to comply with the Resource Conservation and Recovery Act, a law that her later position at the EPA left her to administer nationwide compliance with by both business and government sectors.

Beginning in 1978, Lavelle initiated, directed and managed several programs for Aerojet-General Corporation subsidiaries; these included programs for divisions which manufactured chemicals and industrial and chemical intermediates, nuclear and chemical waste treatment systems, liquid rocket engines for the aerospace industry, and high-speed marine propulsion systems for defence applications.

When Lavelle joined Aerojet-General Corporation, she became director of communications for one subsidiary, Cordova Chemical Co., until 1979, moving to a similar communications position for the largest subsidiary, Aerojet Liquid Rocket Co., in 1979.

In 1981, she was named one of the outstanding women in aerospace by Aerospace Magazine.

== EPA ==
On February 18, 1982, President Ronald Reagan announced his intention to nominate Lavelle for assistant administrator of the U.S. Environmental Protection Agency for solid waste and emergency response. Her position included directing the hazardous waste control program and the $1.6 billion "Superfund" program which provides for the emergency cleanup of chemical spills and hazardous waste dumps.

EPA Administrator Anne Gorsuch described Lavelle as bringing "over 12 years of professional experience in state government and private industry to the agency" and went on to say that "she has demonstrated expertise in getting results, as shown by her record with the executive branch of government in California, with a mid-sized chemical firm and with a large diversified international corporation."

Lavelle had held several positions of responsibility in the California Republican Party, including membership on the executive board of directors of California Federated Republican Women and the Sacramento and Alameda County central committees.

=== Superfund conviction ===
Lavelle was indicted on federal perjury charges after an investigation was launched based on evidence submitted by another EPA employee, whistleblower Hugh Kaufman. The evidence showed that Lavelle was involved with misuse of the EPA's "Superfund" money during her tenure with the agency, and irregularities at the Stringfellow Acid Pits, a major hazardous waste site. In 1983, Lavelle was charged with contempt of Congress for refusing to answer questions about why she was removed as head of the toxic waste disposal program, but was acquitted at trial. In 1984, Lavelle was convicted of lying to Congress and served three months of a six-month prison sentence, paid a $10,000 fine and was under probation for five years.

== Environmental conviction ==
Lavelle and a partner owned NuTECH Enterprises, Inc., an environmental consulting firm in Oceanside, California. Lavelle and Robert V. Cole, a part owner of Denova Environmental, Inc., a hazardous waste storage facility in Rialto, California, forged documents that purportedly bore the signature of Joseph Bertelli, the owner of Lemco Corporation in South Los Angeles, to make it appear that Bertelli owed Cole's company more than $52,000 for the removal and storage of hazardous waste. Those documents were used to obtain $36,441 from Capital Partners USA, Inc. Only when Capital Partners attempted to collect from Bertelli did it realize that Bertelli had neither signed the documents nor agreed to the bill, and Denova had never removed hazardous waste for Lemco.

On September 24, 2004, a jury in Los Angeles federal court found Lavelle guilty of one count of wire fraud and two counts of making false statements to the Federal Bureau of Investigation (FBI). Cole pleaded guilty to one count of wire fraud and was sentenced on December 16, 2004, to one year of probation and was ordered to pay a $3,000 fine. Lavelle was sentenced on January 10, 2005 to 15 months in federal prison. Rita Lavelle was released on July 6, 2007.
