= Cate Jenkins =

EPA whistleblower

Cate Jenkins is a chemist at the Environmental Protection Agency, best known for whistleblowing on possible health effects arising from the September 11 attacks.

== Early life ==
Jenkins survived polio in childhood.

== Monsanto ==
Jenkins accused Monsanto of falsifying a study on Agent Orange's carcinogenity and was wrongly transferred out of her job in the 1990s.

Monsanto has in fact submitted false information to EPA which directly resulted in weakened regulations under RCRA and FIFRA...

— Cate Jenkins, 1990 memorandum, The Ecologist

She raised the issue of dioxins to the public. She was commended by veterans organizations for her work, as her proof that dioxin was carcinogenic allowed those who had gotten injuries from the spraying of Agent Orange to get compensation.

== 9/11 ==
=== Background ===
Jenkins was the first EPA official to warn of the danger of the dust at Ground Zero; asbestos, lead, cement particles, and glass fibers were found in the dust.

She claimed that the EPA deliberately downplayed the dangers of rubble like at 9/11 and had been doing so since the 1980s. She said that the EPA "knowingly falsified the alkaline pH level that is considered safe for human exposure" in setting its corrosivity standard. Caustic dust causes lung damage and cancer.

Christine Todd Whitman, head of the EPA, claimed there was no health hazard from 9/11. On September 18, 2001, Whitman said, "...Their air is safe to breathe...The concentrations are such that they don't pose a health hazard...We're going to make sure everybody is safe."

No protective gear, like respirators, was worn by responders. More than two-thirds have permanent lung damage.

=== Whistleblowing ===
Jenkins claimed she attempted to raise concerns with EPA officials, but was ignored, and retaliated against for doing so.

In 2006, Jenkins sent a letter to Congress claiming that test reports from the EPA intentionally distorted the alkalinity and causticness of the dust at Ground Zero. Later that same year, representatives attempted to see if charges could be brought against Whitman; they could not.

=== Firing and legal case ===
In 2010, Jenkins was fired, purportedly for physically threatening her supervisor. Jenkins is petite and a survivor of childhood polio; her supervisor was male and over six feet tall.

The Merit Systems Protection Board found that Jenkins was denied her right to due process on May 4, 2012; it ordered her reinstated to her position with back pay and interest. Instead of reinstating her, the EPA kept Jenkins on paid administrative leave until refiling charges against her on August 27, 2013.

The MSPB ruled that the EPA could not refile charges if Jenkins established they were retaliation.

“These charges against Dr. Jenkins never made any sense but what makes even less sense is the EPA decision to re-bring them even before a decision has been made on her still-pending retaliation claims and in direct contradiction to the language of the MSB order,” said Paula Dinerstein, Public Employees for Environmental Responsibility Senior Counsel and one of Jenkins's lawyers.

On September 6, 2013, Dinerstein demanded the EPA withdraw its charges or face a new legal action. On September 25, the EPA Deputy Counsel stated they were withdrawn "effective immediately".

In 2015, Department of Labor judge Linda Chapman ruled that the EPA illegally retaliated against Jenkins and sought to conceal exonerating evidence. She found that the EPA had "failed to produce literally thousands of documents" and "deliberately and illegally destroyed an unknown number of documents which should have been under a litigation hold."

=== Rule-making petition ===
In September 2011, Jenkins and PEER filed a rulemaking petition to get the EPA's corrositivity standard changed; the EPA's regulation is 10 times less stringent than those set by the UN and EU.

== In popular culture ==
An episode of 9/11 Whistleblowers focused on her aired August 7, 2019.

== See also ==
- United States Environmental Protection Agency September 11 attacks pollution controversy
- List of EPA whistleblowers
