= EPA September 11 attacks pollution controversy =

2003 controversy

The United States Environmental Protection Agency September 11 attacks pollution controversy was the result of a report released by the Office of the Inspector General of the United States Environmental Protection Agency (EPA) in August 2003 which said the White House pressured the EPA to delete cautionary information about the air quality in New York City around Ground Zero following the September 11 attacks.

== Main findings ==
According to the report: a September 18 EPA statement saying that the air was "safe" was made without sufficient reliable data available; the White House Council on Environmental Quality (CEQ) influenced the EPA to make reassuring comments to the public; and on September 12 the EPA Administrator issued a memo saying that all statements to the media must be cleared by the National Security Council.

Numerous key differences between the draft versions and final versions of EPA statements were found. A recommendation that homes and businesses near ground zero be cleaned by professionals was replaced by a request that citizens follow orders from NYC officials. Another statement that showed concerns about sensitive populations was deleted altogether. Language used to describe excessive amounts of asbestos in the area was altered drastically to minimize attention to the dangers it posed. The report cited how samples showed that the asbestos levels were between double and triple the EPA's danger limit and that the CEQ edit defined it as "slightly above" the limit.

== Administration backlash ==
The report created a short-lived backlash against the administration. Especially angered were New Yorkers who lived near the site of the terrorist attacks. Even a year after 9/11, some 7,000 rescue workers were believed to be suffering from Ground Zero illness: respiratory ailments caused by the dust. Many cleaning efforts by government and private agencies on homes and businesses were accused of being inadequate.

Senators Hillary Clinton and Joseph I. Lieberman sent a letter to President George W. Bush concerning his administration's alleged intervention in internal EPA affairs.

== Whitman interview ==
In an interview with Katie Couric for 60 Minutes, former EPA Administrator Christine Todd Whitman criticized NYC authorities for not requiring rescue workers to wear respirators, as EPA did not have the legal authority. She also defended her own record and said her agency had not lied about air quality surrounding Ground Zero:

The last thing in the world that I would ever do would be to put people at risk. Of all the criticisms that I had in my career ... this is by far the most personally troubling. You want to say, 'You're wrong.' We never lied.

Whitman maintained that her assurances regarding the airborne contaminants only involved lower Manhattan and not the Ground Zero site. However, first responders at Ground Zero were told that there is nothing to worry about regarding air safety. By 2006, Mount Sinai Hospital released a study showing that several World Trade Center responders were already experiencing lung problems due to air toxin exposure. After the World Trade Center Health Program (WTCHP) was set up in 2011 to oversee those exposed to contaminants at Ground Zero, over 37,000 who registered have been declared sick with respiratory illnesses and cancer, among other diseases. Deaths involving individuals in this list had already exceeded 1,100 as of 2016.

== Jenkins interview ==
Cate Jenkins, a senior scientist at the EPA, said two test reports by scientists from New York University distorted the alkalinity of the dust, minimizing its dangers. The scientists from NYU said Jenkins' claims were without scientific merit. In an interview with CBS News, Jenkins said EPA officials knew the air was unsafe, but covered it up:

On Sept. 13, 2001, then-EPA head Christine Todd Whitman told reporters at ground zero, 'We have not seen any reason — any readings that have indicated any health hazard.'

Asked by Smith [the interviewer] if EPA officials lied, Dr. Jenkins responded, 'Yes, they did.'

Though Dr. Jenkins didn't personally conduct the research at ground zero, it's her opinion that the EPA knew the dust there had asbestos and PH levels that were dangerously high.

'This dust was highly caustic,' Dr. Jenkins told Smith, 'in some cases, as caustic and alkaline as Drano.'"

== House hearing ==
In September 2006, the US House of Representatives Committee on Homeland Security held a two-day hearing on illnesses caused by post-9/11 air quality. Whitman, the EPA, and New York City were targets of blame.

== See also ==
- Health effects arising from the September 11 attacks
- World Trade Center lung
