= Penny Newman =

American environmentalist

Director of the Center for Community Action and Environmental Justice

Personal details
- Born: May 30, 1947 (age 78)

Penny Newman (born May 30, 1947) is an environmentalist, a community organizer, and the former director of the Center for Community Action and Environmental Justice (CCAEJ) in Riverside County, California. She is best known for her advocacy work on the Stringfellow Acid Pits, a toxic waste disposal site located in the community of Glen Avon (now incorporated into the City of Jurupa Valley, California), that led to new state and federal rules regarding how toxic waste is disposed.
