= Office of Resource Management =

US government organization

The Office of Resource Management is a US government organization which was created in 2018 to consolidate the EPA's Office of Administrative and Research Support, the Office of Program Accountability and Resource Management, and the grants and contracts managed by the former National Center for Environmental Research (NCER). The move was to help the EPA's Office of Research and Development be more responsive to agency priorities and funding realities.
