= Children's Health Protection Advisory Committee =

The Children's Health Protection Advisory Committee (CHPAC) is an American government commission that provides recommendations to the United States government on regulations, research, and communications related to children's health.

== History ==
CHPAC was created under Executive Order 13045 by President Bill Clinton in April 1997.

The committee has provided recommendations and advice on topics including water pollution, air pollution, chemical safety, risk assessment, environmental health, ADHD, childhood obesity, Asthma, child development, prenatal development, and child health.

The committee is composed of researchers, academics, business representatives, health care providers, environmentalists, state and tribal government employees, and members of the public. Committee members meet throughout the year and provide recommendations to the EPA Administrator as well as the U.S. Office of Children's Health Protection.

Members serve for three-year terms with a two-term limit.
