= Anne Gorsuch Burford =

American politician and attorney (1942–2004)

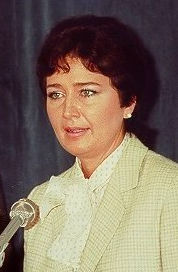

4th Administrator of the Environmental Protection Agency
- In office May 5, 1981 – March 9, 1983
- President: Ronald Reagan
- Deputy: John Hernandez
- Preceded by: Walter Barber Jr. (acting)
- Succeeded by: Lee Verstandig (acting)

Member of the Colorado House of Representatives from the 12th district
- In office 1976–1980
- Preceded by: David Gaon
- Succeeded by: Don Eberle

Personal details
- Born: Anne Irene McGill; April 21, 1942 Casper, Wyoming, U.S.
- Died: July 18, 2004 (aged 62) Aurora, Colorado, U.S.
- Party: Republican
- Spouses: David Gorsuch (m. 1964; div. 1982) Robert F. Burford (m. 1983; died 1993)
- Children: 3, including Neil
- Education: University of Colorado Boulder (BA, JD)

Anne Irene McGill Gorsuch Burford (/ˈɡɔːrsʌtʃ/ GOR-sutch; April 21, 1942 – July 18, 2004), also known as Anne M. Gorsuch, was an American attorney and politician. Between 1981 and 1983, under President Ronald Reagan, she was the first woman to serve as Administrator of the Environmental Protection Agency (EPA). Her son is sitting Associate Justice of the Supreme Court of the United States Neil Gorsuch.

== Early life and education ==
Born Anne Irene McGill in Casper, Wyoming, Gorsuch grew up in Denver, where she attended St. Francis DeSales High School.

During three consecutive summers, she took classes in Spanish at the National University of Mexico. She studied at the University of Colorado Boulder, earning a Bachelor of Arts degree in 1961 at the age of 19. She then attended the University of Colorado Law School where she received a Juris Doctor degree in 1964 at the age of 22; she became the youngest woman admitted to the Colorado Bar at the time. McGill participated in the undergraduate Honors Program and Mortar Board society, and was an editor of the University of Colorado Law School's law review. She was awarded a Fulbright Scholarship to study criminal law for one year in Jaipur, India, and she and her husband David Gorsuch travelled there together.

== Early legal and political career ==
Gorsuch was first employed as an attorney with a bank trust department, then as an assistant district attorney for Jefferson County, Colorado, and as deputy district attorney for the City of Denver, Colorado. Subsequently she was a corporate attorney for Mountain Bell Telephone. In 1975 she was elected to the Colorado House of Representatives, and served in office for two two-year terms. She was voted Outstanding Freshman Legislator, but was considered by some to be a member of the "House Crazies," a group of "conservative lawmakers intent on permanently changing government".

In 1980, Gorsuch served on President-elect Reagan's transition team as a member of his Advisory Committee on Intergovernmental Relations. Shortly after Reagan was inaugurated, Gorsuch was nominated as administrator of the EPA. The nomination was unanimously confirmed by the Senate three months later on May 5, 1981.

== EPA Administrator ==
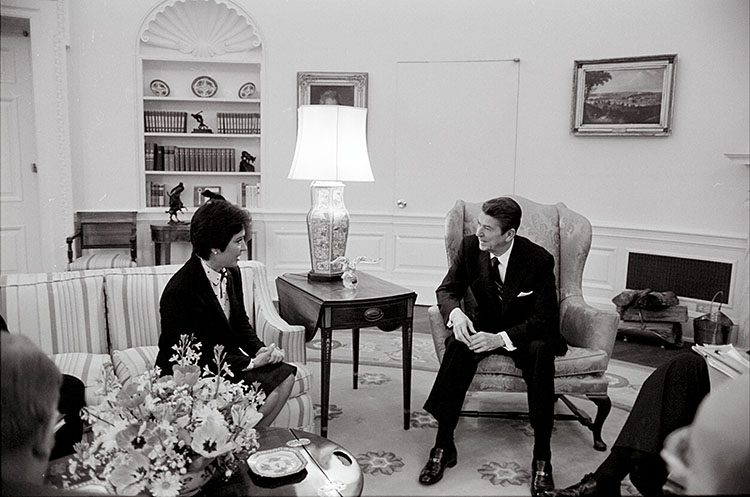
Gorsuch meeting with President Ronald Reagan in 1981

Gorsuch based her administration of the EPA on the New Federalism approach of downsizing federal agencies by delegating their functions and services to the individual states. She believed that the EPA was over-regulating business and that the agency was too large and not cost-effective. During her 22 months as agency head, she cut the budget of the EPA by 22%, reduced the number of cases filed against polluters, relaxed Clean Air Act regulations, and facilitated the spraying of restricted-use pesticides. She cut the total number of agency employees, and hired staff from the industries they were supposed to be regulating. Environmentalists contended that her policies were designed to placate polluters, and accused her of trying to dismantle the agency. It was reported in 1982 that the EPA was disregarding management of toxic landfills, citing costs.

=== Thriftway Company ===
Thriftway Company, a small oil refinery in Farmington, New Mexico, asked Gorsuch for a meeting to discuss the regulations limiting lead content of gasoline, the program under Section 211 of the Clean Air Act designed to reduce the amount of lead in gasoline in annual phases, and to receive relief from the standard. In December 1981, while EPA was developing revisions to those regulation at the request of the Reagan Administration, Gorsuch met with representatives from the company, who asked her to excuse Thriftway from compliance with the lead limits because "the company faced financial ruin if it could not obtain quick relief from the regulations". Gorsuch did not commit herself in writing but she did tell them they could count on her promise as the word of the EPA Administrator that she would not enforce the regulations.

=== Superfund ===
In 1982, Congress charged that the EPA had mishandled the $1.6 billion toxic waste Superfund by taking certain inappropriate and potentially illegal actions including withholding disbursements in order to affect a California political campaign. When Congress demanded records from Gorsuch, she refused and as a result became the first agency director in U.S. history to be cited for contempt of Congress.

Hugh Kaufman, an EPA employee, leaked documents to Congress. Gorsuch denied any wrong-doing.

The stand-off ended in late February 1983, when Richard Hauser, the White House deputy counsel, confirmed one or more Reagan Administration officials had in fact reported to the White House that they had heard Gorsuch say at an August 4, 1982, luncheon that she was holding back more than $6 million in Federal funds to clean up the Stringfellow Acid Pits toxic waste site near Los Angeles to avoid helping the Senate campaign of former Gov. Jerry Brown of California, a Democrat.

The White House then abandoned its court claim that the documents related to this incident could not be subpoenaed by Congress because they were covered by executive privilege and the EPA turned the documents over to Congress. Gorsuch resigned her post effective March 3, 1983, citing pressures caused by the media and the congressional investigation. Reagan said the criticism of Gorsuch, along with his administration's policies, amounted to "environmental extremism."

=== EPA legacy ===
Looking back at her tenure several years later, Gorsuch expressed pride in the downsizing done under her watch and frustration at the program backlogs and lack of staff management skills that she encountered while at the helm of the agency. She said there was a conflict between what she was required to do under a "set of commands from Congress," and what her own priorities were, although she felt that by the end of her administration, she had developed a way of resolving those conflicts. In her retrospective, Gorsuch admitted that she and her staff "were so bogged down in the fight with Congress over the doctrine of executive privilege, that the agency itself seemed hardly to be functioning," but claimed that despite appearances the agency still functioned. Her 22-month tenure was considered "one of the most controversial of the early Reagan administration."

== Subsequent career ==
Gorsuch was promised another job by Reagan, and in July 1984, he appointed her to a three-year term as chair of the National Advisory Committee on Oceans and Atmosphere, a move that was criticized by environmental groups. She described the post as a "nothing-burger", and both the House and the Senate passed non-binding resolutions calling on President Reagan to withdraw the appointment. Ultimately, Gorsuch chose not to accept the position.

After leaving government service, she wrote a 1986 book about her experiences titled Are You Tough Enough? She then worked as a private attorney in Colorado until her death.

== Personal life ==
Anne McGill married David Gorsuch after finishing law school. They divorced in 1982 while she was serving as EPA Administrator. The couple had two sons, J. J. and Neil, and a daughter, Stephanie. Neil Gorsuch became an Associate Justice of the United States Supreme Court in 2017. In the oral argument for the Loper Bright Enterprises case her status as EPA administrator at the beginning of the Chevron case was mentioned. Justice Gorsuch voted to overrule the Chevron decision.

By Gorsuch's later account, her son Neil, who was then 15 years old, was furious with her when she resigned under pressure from the EPA. "You should never have resigned," he told his mother. "You didn't do anything wrong. You only did what the president ordered. Why are you quitting? You raised me not to be a quitter. Why are you a quitter?"

In 1983, Gorsuch married Bureau of Land Management head and rancher Robert F. Burford, with whom she had previously served in the Colorado House of Representatives. A divorce from Burford was pending when he died in 1993.

Gorsuch died of cancer in 2004 in Aurora, Colorado, aged 62.

Political offices
| Preceded by Douglas Costle | Administrator of the Environmental Protection Agency; 1981–1983 | Succeeded by William Ruckelshaus |
