= United States Environmental Protection Agency =

U.S. federal government agency

- Seal

- Logo

- Flag

Agency overview
- Formed: December 2, 1970
- Jurisdiction: Federal government of the United States
- Headquarters: William Jefferson Clinton Federal Building; 38.8939°N 77.0289°W
- Employees: 14,130
- Annual budget: $9,559,485,000
- Agency executives: Lee Zeldin, Administrator; David Fotouhi, Deputy Administrator
- Website: epa.gov
- Agency ID: 6800

The Environmental Protection Agency (EPA) is an independent agency of the United States government tasked with environmental protection matters. President Richard Nixon proposed the establishment of EPA on July 9, 1970; it began operation on December 2, 1970, after Nixon signed an executive order. The order establishing the EPA was sent to the House and Senate in accordance with the Reorganization Act of 1949, in which they had 60 days to pass a disapproval resolution or the order would take effect. Congress did not pass a disapproval resolution, and the order establishing the EPA went into effect.

The agency is led by its administrator, who is appointed by the president and approved by the Senate. Since January 29, 2025, the administrator is Lee Zeldin. The EPA is not a Cabinet department, but the administrator is normally given cabinet rank. The EPA has its headquarters in Washington, D.C. There are regional offices for each of the agency's ten regions, as well as 27 laboratories around the country.

The agency conducts environmental assessment, research, and education. It has the responsibility of maintaining and enforcing national standards under a variety of U.S. environmental laws, in consultation with state, tribal, and local governments. EPA enforcement powers include fines, sanctions, and other measures.

It delegates some permitting, monitoring, and enforcement responsibility to U.S. states and the federally recognized tribes. The agency also works with industries and all levels of government in a wide variety of voluntary pollution prevention programs and energy conservation efforts.

The agency's budgeted employee level in 2023 was 16,204.1 full-time equivalent (FTE). More than half of EPA's employees are engineers, scientists, and environmental protection specialists; other employees include legal, public affairs, financial, and information technologists.

== History ==
=== Background ===
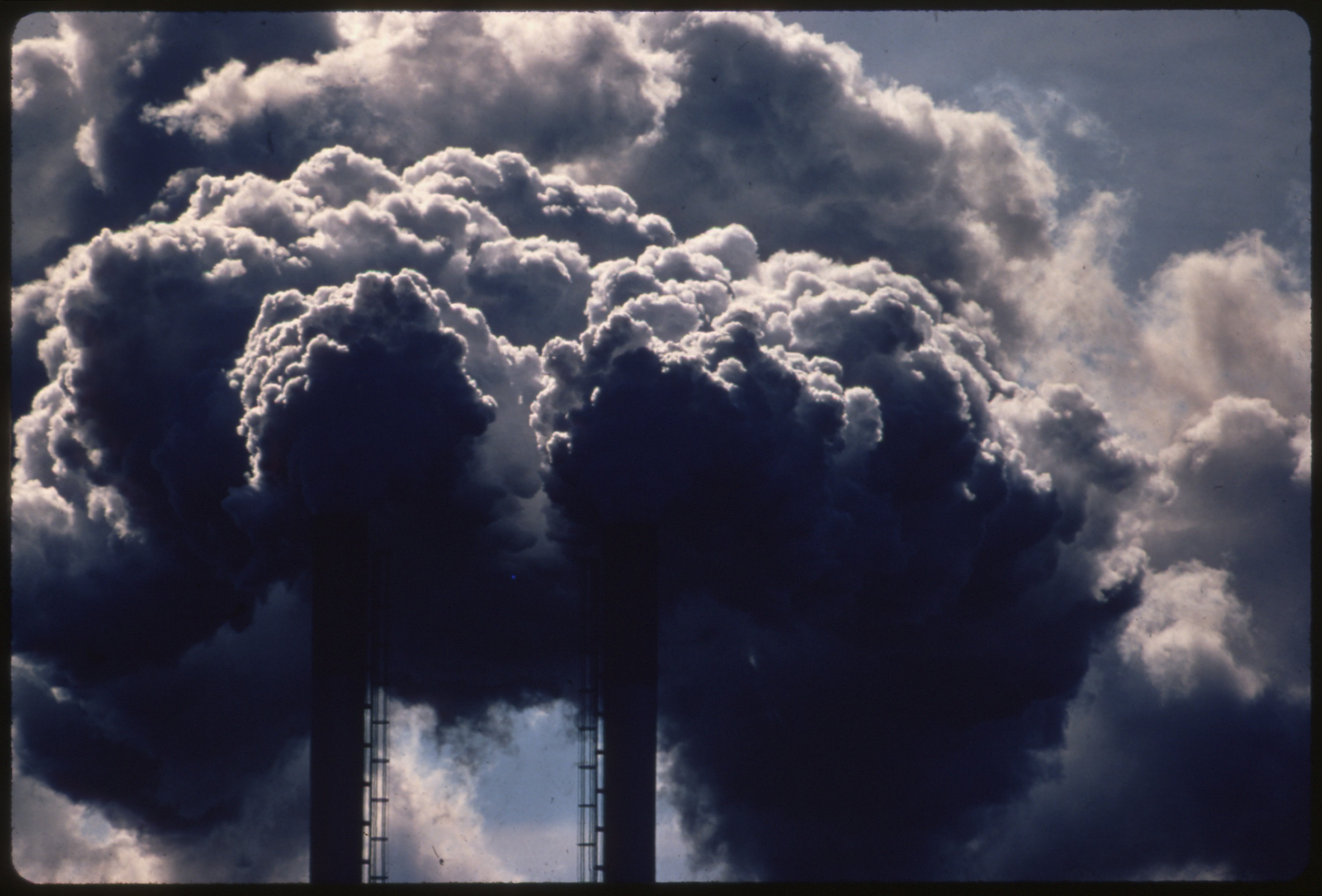
Stacks emitting smoke from burning discarded automobile batteries, photo taken in Houston in 1972 by Marc St. Gil, official photographer of recently founded EPA

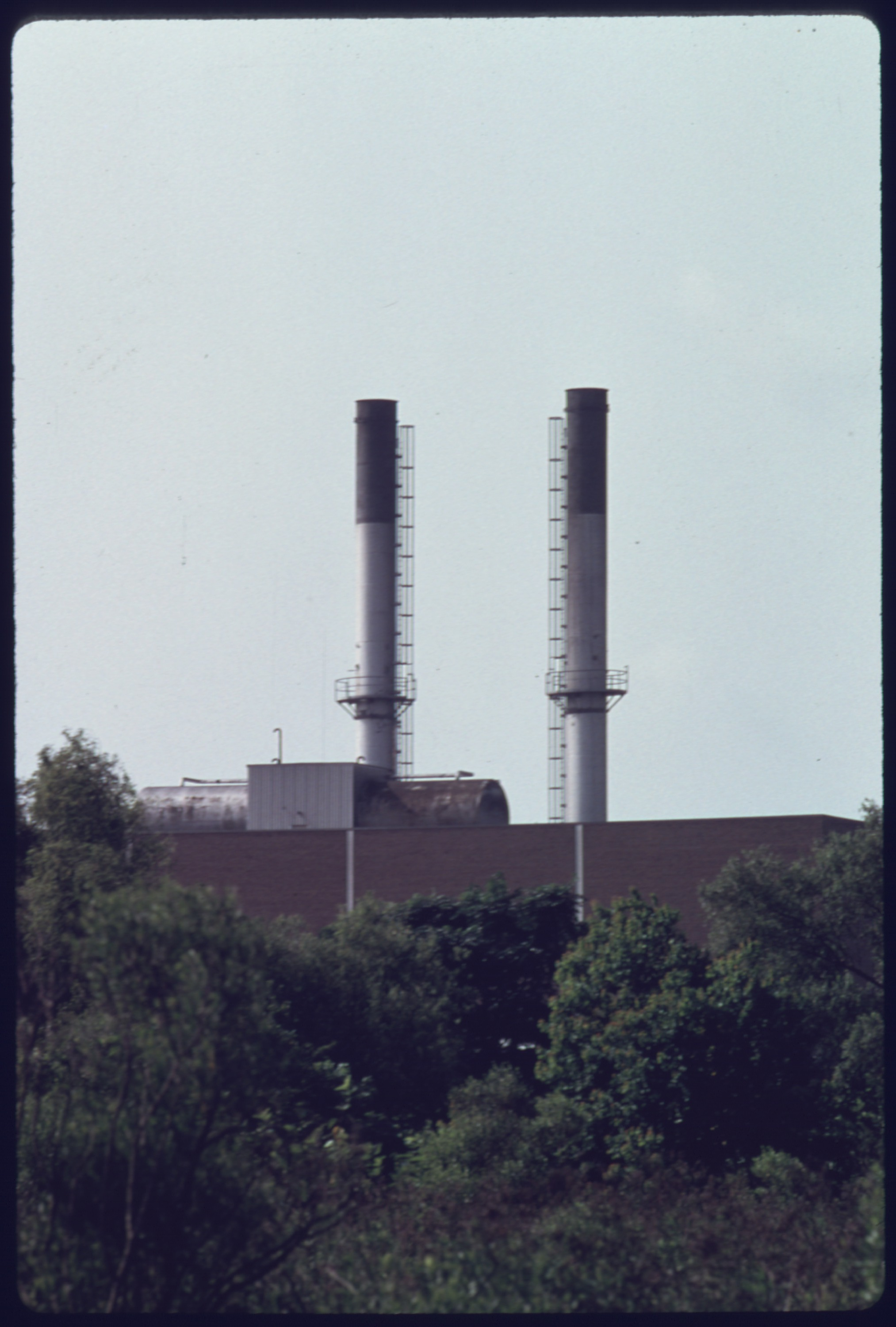
Same smokestacks in 1975 after the plant was closed in a push for greater environmental protection

Beginning in the late 1950s and through the 1960s, the US Congress reacted to increasing public concern about the impact that human activity could have on the environment. Senator James E. Murray introduced a bill, the Resources and Conservation Act (RCA) of 1959, in the 86th Congress. The bill would have established a Council on Environmental Quality in the Executive Office of the President, declared a national environmental policy, and required the preparation of an annual environmental report. The conservation movement was weak at the time and the bill did not pass Congress.

The 1962 publication of Silent Spring, a best-selling book by Rachel Carson, alerted the public about the detrimental effects on animals and humans of the indiscriminate use of pesticide chemicals.

In the years following, Congress discussed possible solutions. In 1968, a joint House–Senate colloquium was convened by the chairmen of the Senate Committee on Interior and Insular Affairs, Senator Henry M. Jackson, and the House Committee on Science and Astronautics, Representative George P. Miller, to discuss the need for and means of implementing a national environmental policy. Congress enacted the National Environmental Policy Act of 1969 (NEPA) and the law was based on ideas that had been discussed in the 1959 and subsequent hearings.

The Richard Nixon administration made the environment a policy priority in 1969–1971 and created two new agencies, the Council on Environmental Quality (CEQ) and EPA. Nixon signed NEPA into law on January 1, 1970. The law established the CEQ in the Executive Office of the President. NEPA required that a detailed statement of environmental impacts be prepared for all major federal actions significantly affecting the environment. The "detailed statement" would ultimately be referred to as an environmental impact statement (EIS).

=== Establishment ===
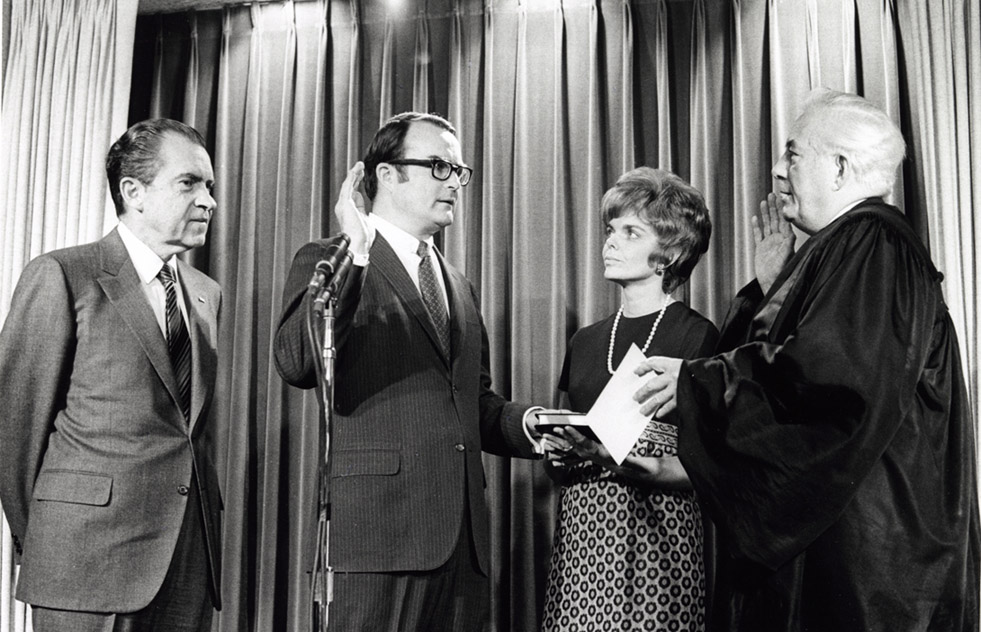
Ruckelshaus sworn in as first EPA administrator

On July 9, 1970, Nixon proposed an executive reorganization that consolidated many environmental responsibilities of the federal government under one agency, a new Environmental Protection Agency. This proposal included merging pollution control programs from a number of departments, such as the combination of pesticide programs from the United States Department of Agriculture and the United States Department of the Interior. After conducting hearings during that summer, the House and Senate approved the proposal. The EPA was created 90 days before it had to operate, and officially opened its doors on December 2, 1970. The agency's first administrator, William Ruckelshaus, took the oath of office on December 4, 1970.

EPA's primary predecessor was the former Environmental Health Divisions of the U.S. Public Health Service (PHS), and its creation caused one of a series of reorganizations of PHS that occurred during 1966–1973. From PHS, EPA absorbed the entire National Air Pollution Control Administration, as well as the Environmental Control Administration's Bureau of Solid Waste Management, Bureau of Water Hygiene, and part of its Bureau of Radiological Health. It also absorbed the Federal Water Quality Administration, which had previously been transferred from PHS to the Department of the Interior in 1966. A few functions from other agencies were also incorporated into EPA: the formerly independent Federal Radiation Council was merged into it; pesticides programs were transferred from the Department of the Interior, Food and Drug Administration, and Agricultural Research Service; and some functions were transferred from the Council on Environmental Quality and Atomic Energy Commission.

Upon its creation, EPA inherited 84 sites spread across 26 states, of which 42 sites were laboratories. The EPA consolidated these laboratories into 22 sites.

=== 1970s ===
In its first year, the EPA had a budget of $1.4 billion and 5,800 employees. At its start, the EPA was primarily a technical assistance agency that set goals and standards. Soon, new acts and amendments passed by Congress gave the agency its regulatory authority. A major expansion of the Clean Air Act was approved in December 1970.

EPA staff recall that in the early days there was "an enormous sense of purpose and excitement" and the expectation that "there was this agency which was going to do something about a problem that clearly was on the minds of a lot of people in this country," leading to tens of thousands of resumes from those eager to participate in the mighty effort to clean up America's environment.

When EPA first began operation, members of the private sector felt strongly that the environmental protection movement was a passing fad. Ruckelshaus stated that he felt pressure to show a public which was deeply skeptical about government's effectiveness, that EPA could respond effectively to widespread concerns about pollution.

The burning Cuyahoga River in Cleveland, Ohio, in 1969 led to a national outcry and criminal charges against major steel companies. The US Justice Department in late 1970 began pollution control litigation in cooperation with the new EPA. Congress enacted the Federal Water Pollution Control Act Amendments of 1972, better known as the Clean Water Act (CWA). The CWA established a national framework for addressing water quality, including mandatory pollution control standards, to be implemented by the agency in partnership with the states. Congress amended the Federal Insecticide, Fungicide, and Rodenticide Act (FIFRA) in 1972, requiring EPA to measure every pesticide's risks against its potential benefits.

In 1973 President Nixon appointed Russell E. Train to be the next EPA administrator. In 1974 Congress passed the Safe Drinking Water Act, requiring EPA to develop mandatory federal standards for all public water systems, which serve 90% of the US population. The law required EPA to enforce the standards with the cooperation of state agencies.

In October 1976, Congress passed the Toxic Substances Control Act (TSCA) which, like FIFRA, related to the manufacture, labeling and usage of commercial products rather than pollution. This act gave the EPA the authority to gather information on chemicals and require producers to test them, gave it the ability to regulate chemical production and use (with specific mention of PCBs), and required the agency to create the National Inventory listing of chemicals.

Congress also enacted the Resource Conservation and Recovery Act (RCRA) in 1976, significantly amending the Solid Waste Disposal Act of 1965. It tasked the EPA with setting national goals for waste disposal, conserving energy and natural resources, reducing waste, and ensuring environmentally sound management of waste. Accordingly, the agency developed regulations for solid and hazardous waste that were to be implemented in collaboration with states.

President Jimmy Carter appointed Douglas M. Costle as EPA administrator in 1977. To manage the agency's expanding legal mandates and workload, by the end of 1979 the budget grew to $5.4 billion and the workforce size increased to 13,000.

=== 1980s ===
In 1980, following the discovery of many abandoned or mismanaged hazardous waste sites such as Love Canal, Congress passed the Comprehensive Environmental Response, Compensation, and Liability Act, nicknamed "Superfund." The new law authorized EPA to cast a wider net for parties responsible for sites contaminated by previous hazardous waste disposal and established a funding mechanism for assessment and cleanup.

In a dramatic move to the right, President Ronald Reagan in 1981 appointed Anne Gorsuch as EPA administrator. Gorsuch based her administration of EPA on the New Federalism approach of downsizing federal agencies by delegating their functions and services to the individual states. She believed that EPA was over-regulating business and that the agency was too large and not cost-effective. During her 22 months as agency head, she cut the budget of the EPA by 22%, reduced the number of cases filed against polluters, relaxed Clean Air Act regulations, and facilitated the spraying of restricted-use pesticides. She cut the total number of agency employees, and hired staff from the industries they were supposed to be regulating. Environmentalists contended that her policies were designed to placate polluters, and accused her of trying to dismantle the agency.

Assistant Administrator Rita Lavelle was fired by Reagan in February 1983 because of her mismanagement of the Superfund program. Gorsuch had increasing confrontations with Congress over Superfund and other programs, including her refusal to submit subpoenaed documents. Gorsuch was cited for contempt of Congress and the White House directed EPA to submit the documents to Congress. Gorsuch and most of her senior staff resigned in March 1983. Reagan then appointed William Ruckelshaus as EPA administrator for a second term. As a condition for accepting his appointment, Ruckleshaus obtained autonomy from the White House in appointing his senior management team. He then appointed experienced competent professionals to the top management positions, and worked to restore public confidence in the agency.

Lee M. Thomas succeeded Ruckelshaus as administrator in 1985. In 1986 Congress passed the Emergency Planning and Community Right-to-Know Act, which authorized the EPA to gather data on toxic chemicals and share this information with the public. EPA also researched the implications of stratospheric ozone depletion. Under Administrator Thomas, EPA joined with several international organizations to perform a risk assessment of stratospheric ozone, which helped provide motivation for the Montreal Protocol, which was agreed to in August 1987.

In 1988, during his first presidential campaign, George H. W. Bush was vocal about environmental issues. Following his election victory, he appointed William K. Reilly, an environmentalist, as EPA administrator in 1989. Under Reilly's leadership, the EPA implemented voluntary programs and initiated the development of a "cluster rule" for multimedia regulation of the pulp and paper industry. At the time, there was increasing awareness that some environmental issues were regional or localized in nature, and were more appropriately addressed with sub-national approaches and solutions. This understanding was reflected in the 1990 amendments to the Clean Air Act and in new approaches by the agency, such as a greater emphasis on watershed-based approaches in Clean Water Act programs.

=== 1990s ===
In 1992 EPA and the Department of Energy launched the Energy Star program, a voluntary program that fosters energy efficiency, and established an Office of Environmental Justice (OEJ) within the enforcement office. The purpose of OEJ was to help coordinate environmental justice work within the various EPA programs, as well as with other federal agencies, and to support efforts to protect communities that were facing disproportionate environmental burdens.

Carol Browner was appointed EPA administrator by President Bill Clinton and served from 1993 to 2001. Major projects during Browner's term included:

- Initiation of the Brownfields pilot program in 1995
- Initial hazardous air pollution standards for petroleum refineries in 1995
- Initial lead paint abatement regulations under TSCA in 1996
- Update of the National Ambient Air Quality Standards for particulate matter and ozone in 1997.

In 1994 President Clinton signed Executive Order 12898, which provided more explicit direction to federal agencies on addressing environmental justice. The order directed all federal agencies to consider how their actions might affect minority and low-income communities, especially communities that face higher levels of pollution or other environmental issues.

Since the passage of the Superfund law in 1980, an excise tax had been levied on the chemical and petroleum industries, to support the cleanup trust fund. Congressional authorization of the tax was due to expire in 1995. Although Browner and the Clinton Administration supported continuation of the tax, Congress declined to reauthorize it by 1995. Subsequently, the Superfund program was supported only by annual appropriations, greatly reducing the number of waste sites that are remediated in a given year. (In 2021 Congress reauthorized an excise tax on chemical manufacturers.)

Major environmental legislative updates during the Clinton Administration were the 1996 Food Quality Protection Act and the 1996 amendments to the Safe Drinking Water Act.

=== 2000s ===
President George W. Bush appointed Christine Todd Whitman as EPA administrator in 2001. Whitman was succeeded by Mike Leavitt in 2003 and Stephen L. Johnson in 2005.

In 2004, the EPA launched the SmartWay program, a voluntary public-private program for transportation companies to manage and reduce their emissions.

In March 2005 nine states (California, New York, New Jersey, New Hampshire, Massachusetts, Maine, Connecticut, New Mexico and Vermont) sued the EPA. The EPA's inspector general had determined that the EPA's regulation of mercury emissions did not follow the Clean Air Act, and that the regulations were influenced by top political appointees. The EPA had suppressed a study it commissioned by Harvard University which contradicted its position on mercury controls. The suit alleged that the EPA's rule exempting coal-fired power plants from "maximum available control technology" was illegal, and additionally charged that the EPA's system of cap-and-trade to lower average mercury levels would allow power plants to forego reducing mercury emissions, which they objected would lead to dangerous local hotspots of mercury contamination even if average levels declined. Several states also began to enact their own mercury emission regulations. Illinois's proposed rule would have reduced mercury emissions from power plants by an average of 90% by 2009. In 2008—by which point a total of fourteen states had joined the suit—the U.S. Court of Appeals for the District of Columbia ruled that the EPA regulations violated the Clean Air Act. In response, EPA announced plans to propose such standards to replace the vacated Clean Air Mercury Rule, and did so on March 16, 2011.

In July 2005 there was a delay in the issuance of an EPA report showing that auto companies were using loopholes to produce less fuel-efficient cars. The report was supposed to be released the day before a controversial energy bill was passed and would have provided backup for those opposed to it, but the EPA delayed its release at the last minute.

EPA initiated its voluntary WaterSense program in 2006 to encourage water efficiency through the use of a special label on consumer products.

In 2007 the state of California sued the EPA for its refusal to allow California and 16 other states to raise fuel economy standards for new cars. EPA Administrator Stephen Johnson claimed that the EPA was working on its own standards, but the move has been widely considered an attempt to shield the auto industry from environmental regulation by setting lower standards at the federal level, which would then preempt state laws. California governor Arnold Schwarzenegger, along with governors from 13 other states, stated that the EPA's actions ignored federal law, and that existing California standards (adopted by many states in addition to California) were almost twice as effective as the proposed federal standards. It was reported that Johnson ignored his own staff in making this decision.

In 2007 it was reported that EPA research was suppressed by career managers. Supervisors at EPA's National Center for Environmental Assessment required several paragraphs to be deleted from a peer-reviewed journal article about EPA's integrated risk information system, which led two co-authors to have their names removed from the publication, and the corresponding author, Ching-Hung Hsu, to leave EPA "because of the draconian restrictions placed on publishing". The 2007 report stated that EPA subjected employees who author scientific papers to prior restraint, even if those papers are written on personal time.

In December 2007 EPA administrator Johnson approved a draft of a document that declared that climate change imperiled the public welfare—a decision that would trigger the first national mandatory global-warming regulations. Associate Deputy Administrator Jason Burnett e-mailed the draft to the White House. White House aides—who had long resisted mandatory regulations as a way to address climate change—knew the gist of what Johnson's finding would be, Burnett said. They also knew that once they opened the attachment, it would become a public record, making it controversial and difficult to rescind. So they did not open it; rather, they called Johnson and asked him to take back the draft. Johnson rescinded the draft; in July 2008, he issued a new version which did not state that global warming was danger to public welfare. Burnett resigned in protest.

In April 2008, the Union of Concerned Scientists said that more than half of the nearly 1,600 EPA staff scientists who responded online to a detailed questionnaire reported they had experienced incidents of political interference in their work. The survey included chemists, toxicologists, engineers, geologists and experts in other fields of science. About 40% of the scientists reported that the interference had been more prevalent in the last five years than in previous years.

President Barack Obama appointed Lisa P. Jackson as EPA administrator in 2009.

=== 2010s ===
In 2010 it was reported that a $3 million mapping study on sea level rise was suppressed by EPA management during both the Bush and Obama administrations, and managers changed a key interagency report to reflect the removal of the maps.

Between 2011 and 2012, some EPA employees reported difficulty in conducting and reporting the results of studies on hydraulic fracturing due to industry and governmental pressure, and were concerned about the censorship of environmental reports.

President Obama appointed Gina McCarthy as EPA administrator in 2013.

In 2014, the EPA published its "Tier 3" standards for cars, trucks and other motor vehicles, which tightened air pollution emission requirements and lowered the sulfur content in gasoline.

In 2015, the EPA discovered extensive violations by Volkswagen Group in its manufacture of Volkswagen and Audi diesel engine cars, for the 2009 through 2016 model years. Following notice of violations and potential criminal sanctions, Volkswagen later agreed to a legal settlement and paid billions of US dollars in criminal penalties, and was required to initiate a vehicle buyback program and modify the engines of the vehicles to reduce illegal air emissions.

In August 2015, the EPA finalized the Clean Power Plan to regulate emissions from power plants, projecting a 15-year cut of 32%, or 789 million metric tons of carbon dioxide. In 2019 it was voided and replaced by the Affordable Clean Energy rule under the Trump administration, and in 2022 its constitutionality was ruled out by the Supreme Court.

In August 2015, the 2015 Gold King Mine waste water spill occurred when EPA contractors examined the level of pollutants such as lead and arsenic in a Colorado mine, and accidentally released over three million gallons of waste water into Cement Creek and the Animas River. In 2015, the International Agency for Research on Cancer (IARC), a branch of the World Health Organization, cited research linking glyphosate, an ingredient of the weed killer Roundup manufactured by the chemical company Monsanto, to non-Hodgkin's lymphoma. In March 2017, the presiding judge in a litigation brought about by people who claim to have developed glyphosate-related non-Hodgkin's lymphoma opened Monsanto emails and other documents related to the case, including email exchanges between the company and federal regulators. According to The New York Times, the "records suggested that Monsanto had ghostwritten research that was later attributed to academics and indicated that a senior official at the Environmental Protection Agency had worked to quash a review of Roundup's main ingredient, glyphosate, that was to have been conducted by the United States Department of Health and Human Services." The records show that Monsanto was able to prepare "a public relations assault" on the finding after they were alerted to the determination by Jess Rowland, the head of the EPA's cancer assessment review committee at that time, months in advance. Emails also showed that Rowland "had promised to beat back an effort by the Department of Health and Human Services to conduct its own review."

On February 17, 2017, President Donald Trump appointed Scott Pruitt as EPA administrator. The Democratic Party saw the appointment as a controversial move, as Pruitt had spent most of his career challenging environmental regulations and policies. He did not have previous experience in the environmental protection field and had received financial support from the fossil fuel industry. In 2017, the Presidency of Donald Trump proposed a 31% cut to the EPA's budget to $5.7 billion from $8.1 billion and to eliminate a quarter of the agency jobs. However, this cut was not approved by Congress. Pruitt resigned from the position on July 5, 2018, citing "unrelenting attacks" due to ongoing ethics controversies.

President Trump appointed Andrew R. Wheeler as EPA administrator in 2019. Trump promised to eliminate EPA "in almost every form" leaving "only tidbits" intact.

On July 17, 2019, EPA management prohibited the agency's Scientific Integrity Official, Francesca Grifo, from testifying at a House committee hearing. EPA offered to send a different representative in place of Grifo and accused the committee of "dictating to the agency who they believe was qualified to speak." The hearing was to discuss the importance of allowing federal scientists and other employees to speak freely when and to whom they want to about their research without having to worry about any political consequences.

In September 2019 air pollution standards in California were once again under attack, as the Trump administration attempted to revoke a waiver issued to the state which allowed more stringent standards for auto and truck emissions than the federal standards.

=== 2020s ===
==== Biden presidency (2021–2025) ====
President Joe Biden appointed Michael S. Regan to be administrator in 2021. Regan began serving on March 11, 2021.

In January 2021 the White House announced its "Justice40" Initiative as part of its broader effort to improve equality in minority communities. The goal of the program was to ensure that 40 percent of the benefits from major federal investments go to communities that had been ignored. These investments include climate programs, clean energy projects, and efforts to reduce pollution. Justice40 changed the way federal agencies planned their programs and worked with each other. It guided how they identified disadvantaged communities and how they decided where money and support should go. For the EPA, this meant adjusting some of its grant programs and technical assistance, so they clearly supported the Justice40 goals and showed that the benefits were reaching the communities that needed them most.

In October 2021 EPA announced its "PFAS Strategic Roadmap." PFASs are organofluorine chemical compounds referred to as "forever chemicals". The roadmap is a "whole-of-EPA" strategy and the agency will consider the full life cycle of PFAS, including preventing PFAS from entering the environment, holding polluters accountable, and remediation of contaminated sites. It also will include drinking water monitoring and risk assessment for PFOA and PFOS in biosolids (processed sewage sludge used as fertilizer).

In December 2021 EPA issued new greenhouse gas standards for passenger cars and light trucks. The standards, which will reduce climate pollution and improve public health, became effective for the 2023 vehicle model year.

In March 2022 the Biden administration allowed California to again set stricter auto emissions standards.

In August 2022 the EPA was allotted a listed ~$53.216 billion in funding pursuant to the Inflation Reduction Act (IRA). The EPA listed 24 total initiatives, the most notable among them being greenhouse gas reduction and monitoring, a superfund petroleum tax, replacing current heavy-duty vehicles with zero-emission vehicles, and a methane incentive program.

On February 3, 2023, more than 100 train cars were derailed in East Palestine, and around half of those cars containing chemicals like butyl acrylate, vinyl chloride, and ethylhexyl acrylate. Subsequently, the chemicals combusted into a flame being seen from miles around and the fumes filled the air with residents reporting animals falling ill and a burning sensation in their eyes and nose. The EPA monitored the situation and experts recommended that local residents take part in the EPA's at-home air screening.

In March 2024, EPA published regulations for tailpipe emissions standards that accelerate the transition to electric vehicles (EVs). The standards require at least two-thirds of all new cars sold in the United States to be zero-emissions vehicles by 2032, in order to reduce air pollution and climate change. The agency projected that the regulations would cut emissions by 7 billion metric tons, or 56% of 2026 levels, by 2032.

In April 2024, EPA finalized new standards for power plant carbon emissions, projecting cuts of 65,000 tons by 2028 and 1.38 billion tons by 2047. The agency also issued final drinking water standards for six PFAS compounds.

In December, 2024 the EPA announced it approved California's plan to end the sale of gasoline-only vehicles by 2035. EPA Administrator Michael Regan granted a waiver under the Clean Air Act to California to implement the plan which was first announced in 2020. It required that by 2035 at least 80% of new cars sold be electric and up to 20% plug-in hybrid models. California's rules were adopted by 11 other states including New York, Massachusetts and Oregon.

==== Second Trump presidency (2025–) ====
With the second presidential term of Donald Trump, Lee Zeldin began serving as administrator on January 29, 2025.

On February 27, 2025, EPA received a White House memo issued by Russell Vought to prepare for mass layoffs. Hours earlier, Trump had said that there would be a 65 percent reduction in its roughly 17,000 personnel, which was later corrected to 65 percent overall agency budget cuts.

In early 2025, the EPA began cutting many of the programs that supported environmental justice work. These programs usually help communities that face a variety of environmental burdens, especially low-income neighborhoods and communities of color. Reports from The Guardian and The Washington Post explained that important funding for communities and partnerships with local governments were either paused, reduced, or sent to other parts of the agency. Newsweek also wrote about internal EPA memos that said the cuts were meant to focus the agency on its basic legal duties. In reality, this meant taking money away from programs that helped communities deal with environmental health problems.

After these changes, many towns and cities struggled to continue projects related to pollution cleanup, public health, and environmental monitoring because the funding was no longer available.

In March 2025 the EPA dropped a lawsuit against Denka, a chemical company, which was intended to reduce emissions of chloroprene at its plant in LaPlace, Louisiana.

After the Supreme Court of the United States overturned an injunction against termination of government employees in AFGE v. Trump, the EPA announced in July 2025 that it would be eliminating its Office of Research and Development. The agency had previously denied plans to do so after a leaked memo indicating plans to do so was reported on in March.

The EPA released a new proposed rule in July 2025 to repeal the previous endangerment finding that had been established in 2009 that greenhouse gases posed a risk to human health, a basis used in many of the EPA's regulations supporting the Clean Air Act. Zeldin asserted that the impact of these existing regulations was harming American citizens through increased costs, this being his rationale for eliminating the endangerment finding.

By late 2025, the EPA had greatly reduced its environmental justice work. As part of the administration’s changes, the Office of Environmental Justice and External Civil Rights was shut down, and a large portion of the EJ staff were either reassigned or put on leave. Most EJ grants were also ended, which left many local projects without the funding they depended on. During this time, the EPA also removed EJScreen from its website. This made it harder for communities to access pollution and health data they had previously relied on. Without federal support, many state and local EJ programs began struggling to continue their work. While It was possible to use data from third party EJScreen websites, this information was commonly outdated or inaccurate as data is no longer being collected.

Overall, these changes showed a major shift in federal policy away from community environmental protection and equity-based enforcement.

In January 2026, the EPA changed its methodology for calculating pollution limits. Where previously they had calculated their limits including the monetary value of lives saved, going forward they would only calculate limits based on projected cost to businesses.

In May 2026, the EPA delayed a phaseout of hydrofluorocarbons, a "super pollutant" primarily used in air-conditioners and refrigerators, arguing that the delayed phaseout would "lower the cost of living for hard-working American families." The phaseout of the chemical was signed into law by President Donald Trump during his first term and had bipartisan support in Congress.

The Zeldin-led EPA has been criticized for its pro-business approach and for repealing protections to limit climate change. In a March 2026 letter to the Trump administration, 163 public health and environmental safety groups called for Zeldin to be fired for removing protections in support of public health, safety, and the environment.

== Organization ==
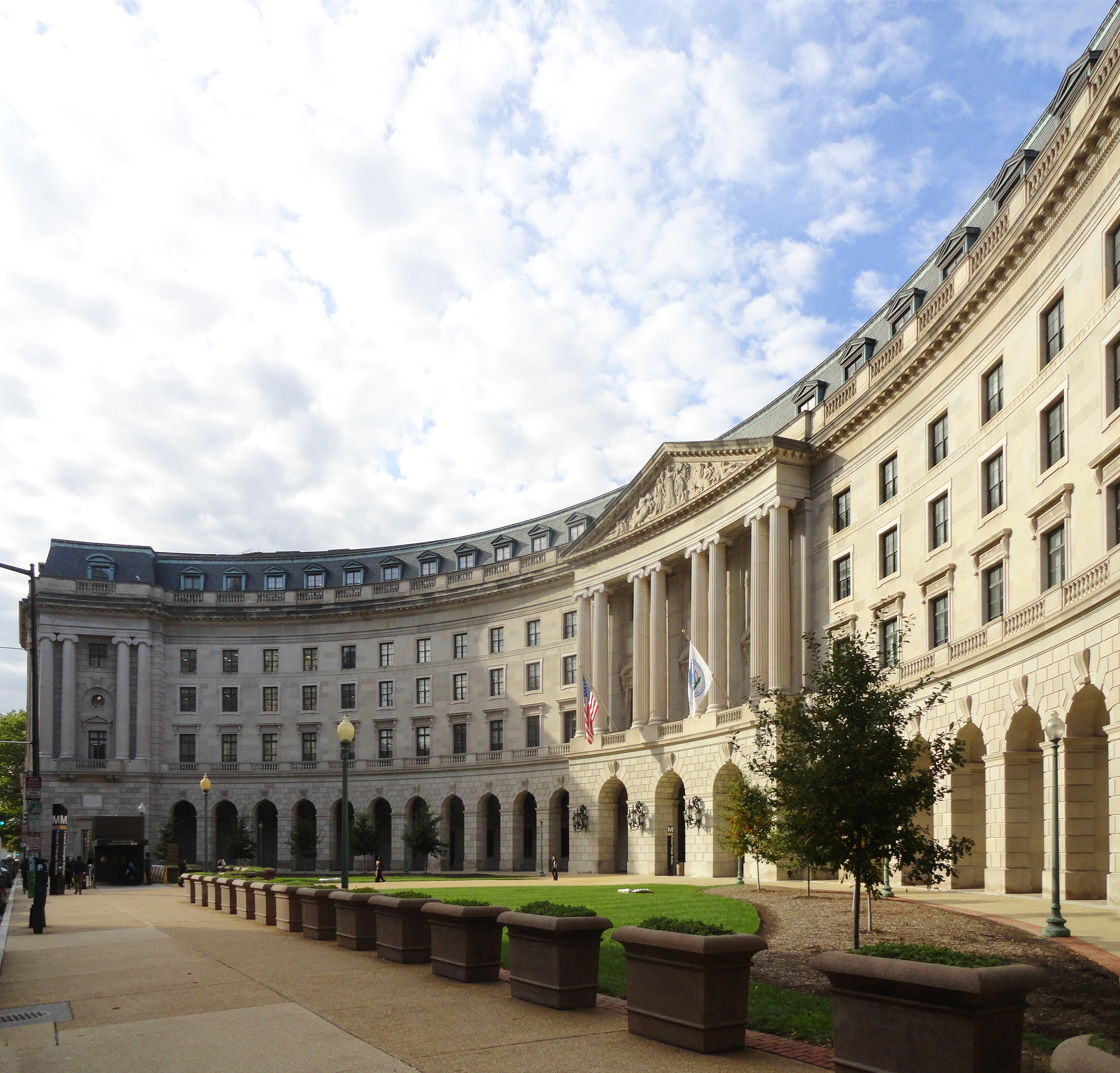
Headquarters of the EPA at the William Jefferson Clinton Federal Building

The EPA is led by the administrator, appointed following nomination by the president and approval from Congress.

=== Offices ===
- Office of the Administrator (OA). As of October 2020, the office consisted of 12 divisions:
  - Office of Administrative and Executive Services
  - Office of Children's Health Protection
    - Children's Health Protection Advisory Committee
  - Office of Civil Rights
  - Office of Congressional and Intergovernmental Relations
  - Office of Continuous Improvement
  - Office of the Executive Secretariat
  - Office of Homeland Security
  - Office of Policy
  - Office of Public Affairs
  - Office of Public Engagement and Environmental Education
  - Office of Small and Disadvantaged Business Utilization
  - Science Advisory Board
- Office of Air and Radiation (OAR)
- Office of Chemical Safety and Pollution Prevention (OCSPP)
- Office of the Chief Financial Officer (OCFO)
- Office of Environmental Justice and External Civil Rights
- Office of Enforcement and Compliance Assurance (OECA)
- Office of General Counsel (OGC)
- Office of Inspector General (OIG)
- Office of International and Tribal Affairs (OITA)
- Office of Mission Support (OMS)
  - Office of Resources and Business Operations (ORBO)
  - Environmental Appeals Board
  - Office of Federal Sustainability
  - Office of Administrative Law Judges
  - Office of Acquisition Solutions (OAS)
  - Office of Administration (OA)
  - Office of Human Resources (OHR)
  - Office of Grants and Debarment (OGD)
  - Office of Customer Advocacy, Policy and Portfolio Management (OCAPPM)
  - Office of Digital Services and Technical Architecture (ODSTA)
  - Office of Information Management (OIM)
  - Office of Information Security and Privacy (OISP)
  - Office of Enterprise Information Programs (OEIP)
  - Office of IT Operations (OITO)

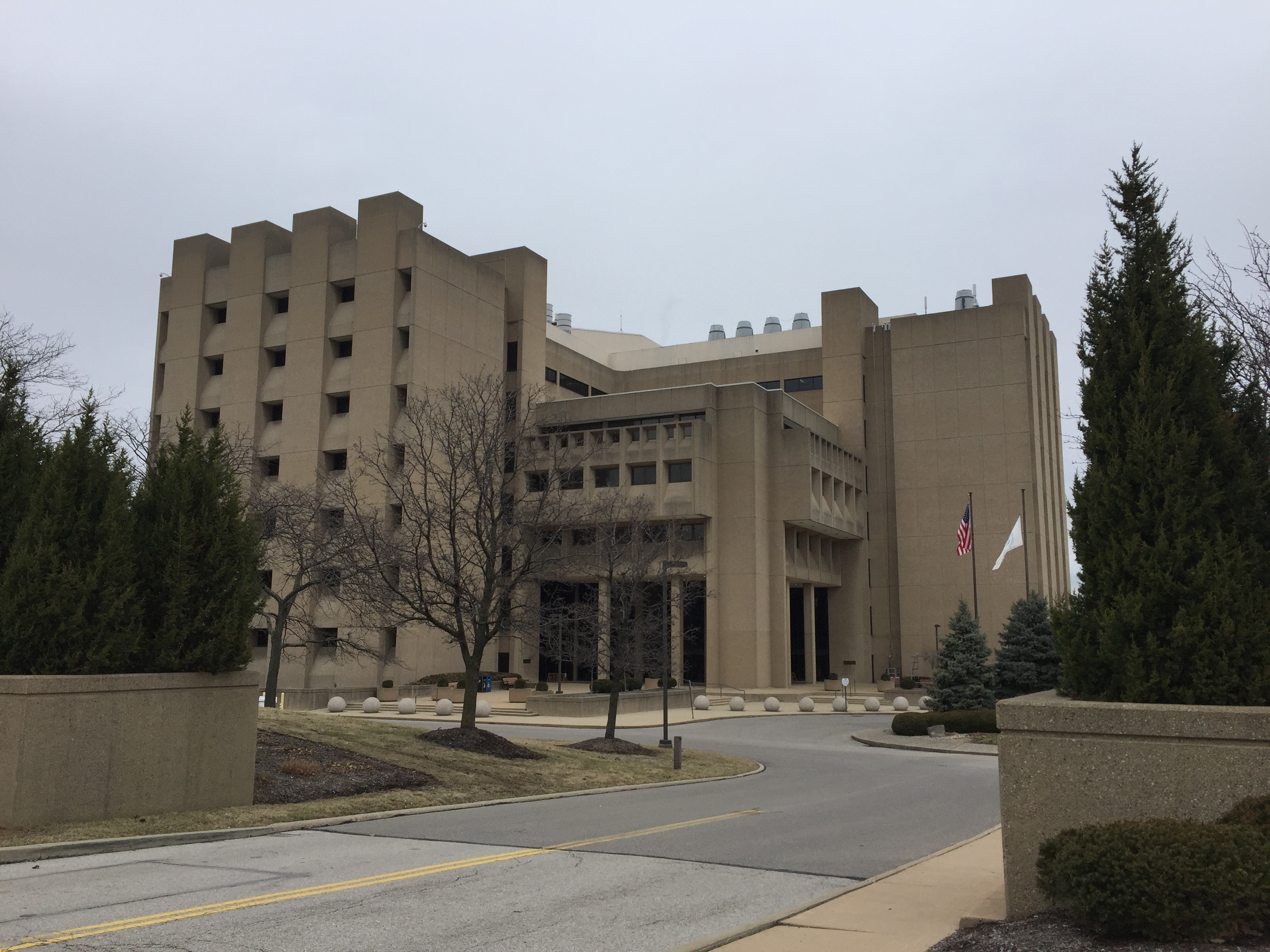
The Andrew W. Breidenbach Environmental Research Center in Cincinnati is EPA's second-largest R&D center.

- Office of Research and Development (ORD), which as of November 2021, consisted of:
  - Immediate Office of the Assistant Administrator
  - Office of Science Advisor, Policy, and Engagement (OSAPE)
  - Office of Science Information Management (OSIM)
  - Office of Resource Management
  - Center for Computational Toxicology and Exposure (CCTE)
  - Center for Environmental Measurement and Modeling (CEMM)
  - Center for Public Health and Environmental Assessment (CPHEA)
  - Center for Environmental Solutions and Emergency Response (CESER)
- Office of Land and Emergency Management (OLEM), which as of March 2017, consisted of:
  - Office of Superfund Remediation and Technology Innovation
  - Office of Resource Conservation and Recovery
  - Office of Underground Storage Tanks
  - Office of Brownfields and Land Revitalization
  - Office of Emergency Management
  - Federal Facilities Restoration and Reuse Office
- Office of Water (OW) which, as of March 2017, consisted of:
  - Office of Ground Water and Drinking Water (OGWDW)
  - Office of Science and Technology (OST)
  - Office of Wastewater Management (OWM)
  - Office of Wetlands, Oceans and Watersheds (OWOW)

=== Regions ===
The administrative regions of the United States Environmental Protection Agency

Creating 10 EPA regions was an initiative that came from President Richard Nixon. See Standard Federal Regions. Each EPA regional office is responsible within its states for implementing the agency's programs, except those programs that have been specifically delegated to states.

- Region 1: responsible within the states of Connecticut, Maine, Massachusetts, New Hampshire, Rhode Island, and Vermont (New England).
- Region 2: responsible within the states of New Jersey and New York. It is also responsible for the US territories of Puerto Rico, and the U.S. Virgin Islands.
- Region 3: responsible within the states of Delaware, Maryland, Pennsylvania, Virginia, West Virginia, and the District of Columbia.
- Region 4: responsible within the states of Alabama, Florida, Georgia, Kentucky, Mississippi, North Carolina, South Carolina, and Tennessee.
- Region 5: responsible within the states of Illinois, Indiana, Michigan, Minnesota, Ohio, and Wisconsin.
- Region 6: responsible within the states of Arkansas, Louisiana, New Mexico, Oklahoma, and Texas.
- Region 7: responsible within the states of Iowa, Kansas, Missouri, and Nebraska.
- Region 8: responsible within the states of Colorado, Montana, North Dakota, South Dakota, Utah, and Wyoming.
- Region 9: responsible within the states of Arizona, California, Hawaii, Nevada, the territories of Guam and American Samoa, and the Navajo Nation.
- Region 10: responsible within the states of Alaska, Idaho, Oregon, and Washington.

Each regional office also implements programs on Indian Tribal lands, except those programs delegated to tribal authorities.

== Legal authority ==
The Environmental Protection Agency can only act pursuant to statutes—the laws passed by Congress. Appropriations statutes authorize how much money the agency can spend each year to carry out the approved statutes. The agency has the power to issue regulations. A regulation interprets a statute, and EPA applies its regulations to various environmental situations and enforces the requirements. The agency must include a rationale of why a regulation is needed. (See Administrative Procedure Act.) Regulations can be challenged in federal courts, either district court or appellate court, depending on the particular statutory provision.

=== Related legislation ===
EPA has principal implementation authority for the following federal environmental laws:

- Clean Air Act
- Clean Water Act
- Comprehensive Environmental Response, Compensation and Liability Act ("Superfund")
- Emergency Planning and Community Right-to-Know Act
- Federal Insecticide, Fungicide, and Rodenticide Act
- Resource Conservation and Recovery Act
- Safe Drinking Water Act
- Toxic Substances Control Act
- Frank R. Lautenberg Chemical Safety for the 21st Century Act

There are additional laws where EPA has a contributing role or provides assistance to other agencies. Among these laws are:

- Endangered Species Act
- Energy Independence and Security Act
- Energy Policy Act
- Federal Food, Drug, and Cosmetic Act
- Food Quality Protection Act
- National Environmental Policy Act
- Oil Pollution Act
- Pollution Prevention Act

== Programs ==
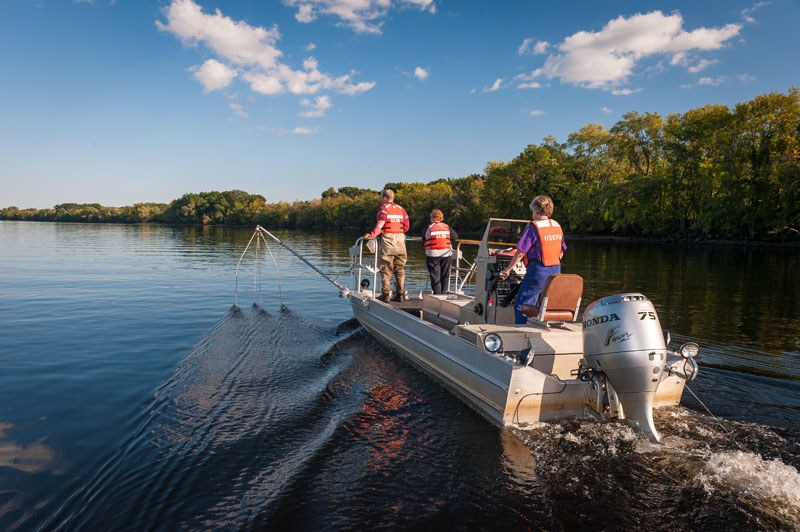
EPA scientists conducting a stream survey on the Merrimack River in Massachusetts

EPA established its major programs pursuant to the primary missions originally articulated in the laws passed by Congress. Additional programs have been developed to interpret the primary missions. Some of the newer programs have been specifically authorized by Congress. Former administrator William Ruckelshaus observed in 2016 that a danger for EPA was that air, water, waste and other programs would be unconnected, placed in "silos", a problem that persists more than 50 years later, albeit less so than at the start.

=== Core programs ===
==== Air quality and radiation protection ====
The Office of Air and Radiation (OAR) describes itself as the official authority in charge of "developing national programs, policies, and regulations for controlling air pollution and radiation exposure." The OAR is responsible for enforcing the Clean Air Act, the Atomic Energy Act, the Waste Isolation Pilot Plant Land Withdrawal Act, and other applicable laws. The OAR is in charge of the Offices of Air Quality Planning and Standards, Atmospheric Protection, Transportation and Air Quality, and the Office of Radiation and Indoor Air.

===== Ambient standards =====
- National Ambient Air Quality Standards (NAAQS)
- State Implementation Plans (SIPs)

===== Stationary air pollution source standards =====
- New Source Performance Standards
- National Emissions Standards for Hazardous Air Pollutants (NESHAPs)
- Permits for industrial and commercial sources

===== Mobile source standards =====
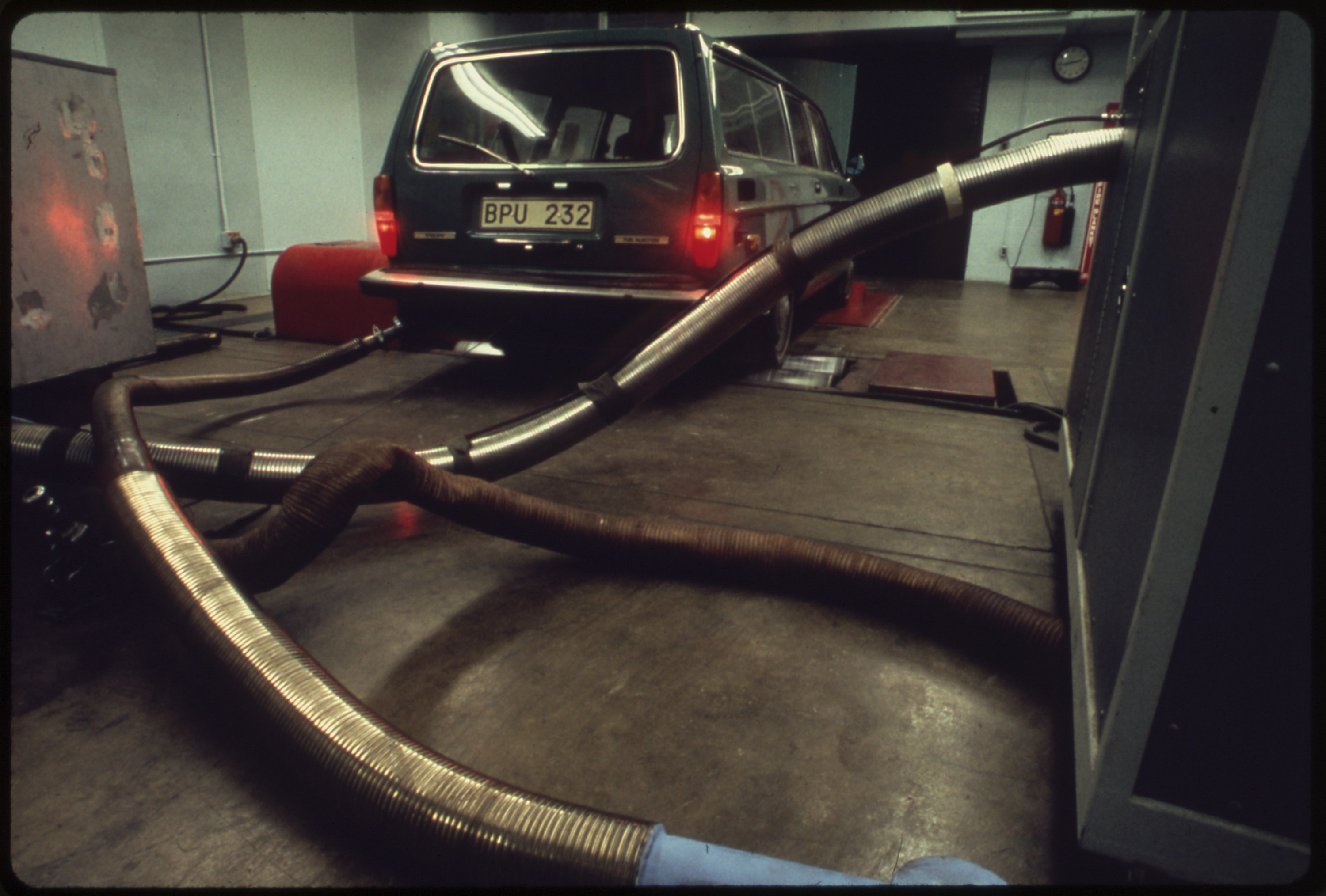
Testing automobile emissions at an EPA laboratory in Ann Arbor, Michigan

- On-road vehicles regulation
- Non-road vehicle regulation (including aircraft, locomotives, marine transport, stationary engines)
- Transportation fuel controls
- National Vehicle Fuel and Emissions Laboratory (NVFEL)

===== Radiation protection =====
The Radiation Protection Program comprises seven project groups.

1. Radioactive Waste
2. Emergency Preparedness and Response Programs Protective Action Guides And Planning Guidance for Radiological Incidents: EPA developed a manual as guideline for local and state governments to protect the public from a nuclear accident, the 2017 version being a 15-year update.
3. EPA's Role in Emergency Response – Special Teams
4. Technologically Enhanced Naturally Occurring Radioactive Materials (TENORM) Program
5. Radiation Standards for Air and Drinking Water Programs
6. Federal Guidance for Radiation Protection

==== Water quality ====
===== Science and regulatory standards =====
- The National Pollutant Discharge Elimination System (NPDES) permit program addresses water pollution by regulating point sources which discharge to US waters. Created in 1972 by the Clean Water Act, the NPDES permit program authorizes state governments to perform its many permitting, administrative, and enforcement aspects. As of 2025, the EPA has approved 47 states to administer all or portions of the permit program. EPA regional offices manage the program in the remaining areas of the country. The Water Quality Act of 1987 extended NPDES permit coverage to industrial stormwater dischargers and municipal separate storm sewer systems. In 2016, there were 6,700 major point source NPDES permits in place and 109,000 municipal and industrial point sources with general or individual permits.
- Effluent guidelines (technology based standards) for industrial point sources and Water quality standards (risk-based standards) for water bodies, under Title III of the CWA
- Nonpoint source pollution programs
- The CWA Section 404 Program regulates the discharge of dredged or fill material into waters of the United States. Permits are issued by the U.S. Army Corps of Engineers and reviewed by EPA, and may be denied if they would cause unacceptable degradation or if an alternative does not exist that does not also have adverse impacts on waters. Permit holders are typically required to restore or create wetlands or other waters to offset losses that cannot be avoided.
- EPA ensures safe drinking water for the public, by setting standards for more than 148,000 public water systems nationwide. EPA oversees states, local governments and water suppliers to enforce the standards under the Safe Drinking Water Act. The program includes regulation of injection wells to protect underground sources of drinking water.

===== Infrastructure financing =====
- The Clean Water State Revolving Fund provides grants to states which, along with matching state funds, are loaned to municipalities for sewage treatment projects and development of green infrastructure at below-market interest rates. These loans are expected to be paid back, creating revolving loan funds. Cumulative assistance from the revolving fund has surpassed US$172 billion as of 2023. The revolving fund replaced the Construction Grants Program, which was phased out in 1990.
- The Drinking Water State Revolving Fund (DWSRF) provides financial assistance to local drinking water utilities. The total appropriation of DWSRF funds available to states, which allocate funds to individual utilities, was US$3.5 billion in 2024.

==== Land, waste and cleanup ====
- Regulation of solid waste (non-hazardous) and hazardous waste under RCRA. To implement the 1976 law, EPA published standards in 1979 for "sanitary" landfills that receive municipal solid waste. The agency published national hazardous waste regulations and established a nationwide permit and tracking system for managing hazardous waste. The system is largely managed by state agencies under EPA authorization. Standards were issued for waste treatment, storage and disposal facilities (TSDFs), and ocean dumping of waste was prohibited. In 1984 Congress passed the Hazardous and Solid Waste Amendments (HSWA) which expanded several aspects of the RCRA program:
  - The Land Disposal Restrictions Program sets treatment requirements for hazardous waste before it may be disposed on land. EPA began issuing treatment methods and levels of requirements in 1986 and these are continually adapted to new hazardous wastes and treatment technologies. The stringent requirements it sets and its emphasis on waste minimization practices encourage businesses to plan to minimize waste generation and prioritize reuse and recycling. From the start of the program in 1984 to 2004, the volume of hazardous waste disposed in landfills had decreased 94% and the volume of hazardous waste disposed of by underground injection had decreased 70%.
  - The RCRA Corrective Action Program requires TSDFs to investigate and clean up hazardous releases at their own expense. In the 1980s, EPA estimated that the number of sites needing cleanup was three times more than the number of sites on the national Superfund list. The program is largely implemented through permits and orders. As of 2016, the program has led to the cleanup of 18 million acres of land, of which facilities were primarily responsible for cleanup costs. The goal of EPA and states is to complete final remedies by 2020 at 3,779 priority facilities out of 6,000 that need to be cleaned up, according to EPA.
  - Beginning in the mid-1980s EPA developed standards for small quantity generators of hazardous waste, pursuant to HSWA.
  - EPA was mandated to conduct a review of landfill conditions nationwide. The agency reported in 1988 that the effectiveness of environmental controls at landfills varied nationwide, which could lead to serious contamination of groundwater and surface waters. EPA published a national plan in 1989 calling for state and local governments to better integrate their municipal solid waste management practices with source reduction and recycling programs.
  - Regulation of Underground Storage Tanks. The Underground Storage Tank (UST) Program was launched in 1985 and covers about 553,000 active USTs containing petroleum and hazardous chemicals. Since 1984, 1.8 million USTs have been closed in compliance with regulations. 38 states, the District of Columbia and Puerto Rico manage UST programs with EPA authorization. When the program began, EPA had only 90 staff to develop a system to regulate more than 2 million tanks and work with 750,000 owners and operators. The program relies more on local operations and enforcement than other EPA programs. Today, the program supports the inspection of all federally regulated tanks, cleans up old and new leaks, minimizes potential leaks, and encourages sustainable reuse of abandoned gas stations.
- Hazardous site cleanup. In the late 1970s, the need to clean up sites such as Love Canal that had been highly contaminated by previous hazardous waste disposal became apparent. However the existing regulatory environment depended on owners or operators to perform environmental control. While the EPA attempted to use RCRA's section 7003 to perform this cleanup, it was clear a new law was needed. In 1980, Congress passed the Comprehensive Environmental Response, Compensation, and Liability Act (CERCLA), commonly known as "Superfund". This law enabled the EPA to cast a wider net for responsible parties, including past or present generators and transporters as well as current and past owners of the site to find funding. The act also established some funding and a tax mechanism on certain industries to help fund such cleanup. Congress did not renew the Superfund tax in the 1990s, and subsequently funding for cleanup actions was supported only by general appropriations. Congress restored an excise tax on chemical manufacturers in 2021, which will eventually increase the available budget for site cleanups. Today, due to restricted funding, most cleanup activities are performed by responsible parties under the oversight of the EPA and states. As of 2016, more than 1,700 sites had been put on the cleanup list since the creation of the program. Of these, 370 sites have been cleaned up and removed from the list, cleanup is underway at 535, cleanup facilities have been constructed at 790 but need to be operated in the future, and 54 are not yet in cleanup stage.
- EPA's oil spill prevention program includes the Spill Prevention, Control, and Countermeasure (SPCC) and the Facility Response Plan (FRP) rules. The SPCC Rule applies to all facilities that store, handle, process, gather, transfer, refine, distribute, use or consume oil or oil products. Oil products includes petroleum and non-petroleum oils as well as: animal fats, oils and greases; fish and marine mammal oils; and vegetable oils. It mandates a written plan for facilities that store more than 1,320 gallons of fuel above ground or more than 42,000 gallons below-ground, and which might discharge to navigable waters (as defined in the Clean Water Act) or adjoining shorelines. Secondary spill containment is mandated at oil storage facilities and oil release containment is required at oil development sites.

==== Chemical approval, manufacture and usage ====
- EPA regulates pesticides under the Federal Insecticide, Fungicide, and Rodenticide Act (FIFRA) and the Food Quality Protection Act. The agency assesses, registers, regulates, and regularly reevaluates all pesticides legally sold in the United States. A few challenges this program faces are transforming toxicity testing, screening pesticides for endocrine disruptors, and regulating biotechnology and nanotechnology.
- EPA approves and regulates new chemicals issuing "safety reviews".
- TSCA required EPA to create and maintain a national inventory of all existing chemicals in U.S. commerce. When the act was passed in 1976, there were more than 60,000 chemicals on the market that had never been comprehensively cataloged. To do so, the EPA developed and implemented procedures that have served as a model for Canada, Japan, and the European Union. For the inventory, the EPA also established a baseline for new chemicals that the agency should be notified about before being commercially manufactured. Today, this rule keeps the EPA updated on volumes, uses, and exposures of around 7,000 of the highest-volume chemicals via industry reporting.
- The Toxics Release Inventory (TRI) is a resource established by the Emergency Planning and Community Right-to-Know Act specifically for the public to learn about toxic chemical releases and pollution prevention activities reported by industrial and federal facilities. TRI data support informed decision-making by communities, government agencies, companies, and others. Annually, the agency collects data from more than 20,000 facilities. The EPA has generated a range of tools to support the use of this inventory, including interactive maps and online databases such as ChemView.

==== Enforcement ====
- Civil enforcement and criminal enforcement programs. EPA develops and prosecutes administrative civil and judicial cases and provides legal support for cases and investigations initiated in its regional offices. Federal judicial actions (formal lawsuits) are filed by the U.S. Department of Justice on behalf of EPA.
- Compliance assistance. EPA identifies, prevents, and reduces noncompliance and environmental risks by establishing enforcement initiatives and ensuring effective monitoring and assessment of compliance.
- Federal facilities enforcement
- Environmental Justice program

In 2019 the Environmental Data & Governance Initiative, "a network of academics, developers, and non-profit professionals", published a report which compared EPA enforcement statistics over time. The number of civil cases filed by EPA have gradually decreased, and in 2018 the criminal and civil penalties from EPA claims dropped over four times their amounts in 2013, 2016, and 2017. In 2016 EPA issued $6,307,833,117 in penalties due to violations of agency requirements, and in 2018 the agency issued $184,768,000 in penalties. EPA's inspections and evaluations have steadily decreased from 2015 to 2018. Enforcement activity has decreased partially due to budget cuts within the agency.

In April 2025, the Department of Justice suddenly ended a long-running environmental justice settlement in Lowndes County, Alabama. The settlement was supposed to help fix the county’s severe wastewater problems, which had harmed mostly Black and low-income residents for years. Federal officials said they ended the agreement because of a new executive order from the Trump administration that restricted diversity, equity, and inclusion programs.

The Associated Press then reported that the decision brought strong criticism from environmental and civil rights groups. They said ending the settlement would make the county’s already serious health problems even worse. Many critics from The Associated Press also saw this as part of a larger trend in 2025, where federal agencies were becoming less active in protecting vulnerable communities. Many warned that ending the Lowndes County agreement showed a broader retreat from federal oversight at a time when many EJ communities were still dealing with pollution, failing infrastructure, and a lack of basic environmental protection.

=== Additional programs ===
- The EPA Safer Choice label, previously known as the "Design for the Environment" (since the 1990s) label, helps consumers and commercial buyers identify and select products with safer chemical ingredients, without sacrificing quality or performance. When a product has the Safer Choice label, it means that every intentionally added ingredient in the product has been evaluated by EPA scientists. Only the safest possible functional ingredients are allowed in products with the Safer Choice label.
- Through the Safer Detergents Stewardship Initiative, EPA's Design for the Environment (DfE) recognizes environmental leaders who voluntarily commit to the use of safer surfactants. Safer surfactants are the ones that break down quickly to non-polluting compounds and help protect aquatic life in both fresh and salt water. Nonylphenol ethoxylates, commonly referred to as NPEs, are an example of a surfactant class that does not meet the definition of a safer surfactant. The Safer Choice program identified safer alternative surfactants through partnerships with industry and environmental advocates. These alternatives are comparable in cost and are readily available. The CleanGredients website is an information source about safer surfactants.
- The Energy Star program, initiated in 1992, motivated major companies to retrofit millions of square feet of building space with more efficient lighting. As of 2006, more than 40,000 Energy Star products were available including major appliances, office equipment, lighting, home electronics, and more. In addition, the label can also be found on new homes and commercial and industrial buildings. In 2006, about 12 percent of new housing in the US displayed an Energy Star label. EPA estimates that the program saved about $14 billion in energy costs in 2006 alone. The program has helped spread the use of LED traffic lights, efficient fluorescent lighting, power management systems for office equipment, and low standby energy use.
- EPA's Smart Growth Program began in 1998 and was created to help communities improve their land development practices and get the type of development they want. Together with local, state, and national experts, EPA encourages development strategies that protect human health and the environment, create economic opportunities, and provide attractive and affordable neighborhoods for people of all income levels.
- The Brownfields Program started as a pilot program in the 1990s and was authorized by law in 2002. The program provides grants and tools to local governments for the assessment, cleanup, and revitalization of brownfields. As of September 2015, the EPA estimates that program grants have resulted in 56,442 acres of land readied for reuse and leveraged 116,963 jobs and $24.2 billion to do so. Agency studies also found that property values around assessed or cleaned-up brownfields have increased 5.1 to 12.8 percent.
- EPA's Indoor air quality Tools for Schools Program helps schools to maintain a healthy environment and reduce exposures to indoor environmental contaminants. It helps school personnel identify, solve, and prevent indoor air quality problems in the school environment. Through the use of a multi-step management plan and checklists for the entire building, schools can lower their students' and staff's risk of exposure to asthma triggers.
- The National Environmental Education Act of 1990 requires EPA to provide national leadership to increase environmental literacy. EPA established the Office of Environmental Education to implement this program.
- Clean School Bus USA is a national partnership to reduce children's exposure to diesel exhaust by eliminating unnecessary school bus idling, installing effective emission control systems on newer buses and replacing the oldest buses in the fleet with newer ones. Its goal is to reduce both children's exposure to diesel exhaust and the amount of air pollution created by diesel school buses.
- The Green Chemistry Program encourages the development of products and processes that follow green chemistry principles. It has recognized more than 100 winning technologies. These reduce the use or creation of hazardous chemicals, save water, and reduce greenhouse gas release.
- The Beaches Environmental Assessment and Coastal Health (BEACH) Act, was authorized in a 2000 amendment to the Clean Water Act. The program focus is on coastal recreational waters, and requires EPA to develop criteria to test and monitor waters and notify public users of any concerns. The program involves states, local beach resource managers, and the agency in assessing risks of stormwater and wastewater overflows and enables better sampling, analytical methods, and communication with the public.
- The EPA has also established specific geographic programs for particular water resources such as the Chesapeake Bay Program, the National Estuary Program, and the Gulf of Mexico Program.
- Advance identification, or ADID, is a planning process used by the EPA to identify wetlands and other bodies of water and their respective suitability for the discharge of dredged and fill material. The EPA conducts the process in cooperation with the U.S. Army Corps of Engineers and local states or Native American Tribes. As of February 1993, 38 ADID projects had been completed, and 33 were ongoing.
- EPA's "One Cleanup Program" initiative was designed to improve coordination across different agency programs that have a role in cleanup at a particular site. The coordination efforts apply to the brownfields, federal facilities, USTs, RCRA and Superfund programs.
- EPA reviews environmental impact statements prepared by other agencies and maintains a national EIS filing system.
- The SmartWay program is a voluntary public-private program for transportation companies to manage and reduce their emissions.

=== Past programs ===
- The former Construction Grants Program distributed federal grants for the construction of municipal wastewater treatment works from 1972 to 1990. While such grants existed before the 1972, the 1972 CWA expanded these grants dramatically. They were distributed through 1990, when the program and funding were replaced with the State Revolving Loan Fund Program.
- In 1991 under Administrator William Reilly, the EPA implemented its voluntary 33/50 program. This was designed to encourage, recognize, and celebrate companies that voluntarily found ways to prevent and reduce pollution in their operations. Specifically, it challenged industry to reduce Toxic Release Inventory emissions of 17 priority chemicals by 33% in one year and 50% in four years. These results were achieved before the commitment deadlines.
- Launched in 2006, the voluntary 2010/2015 PFOA Stewardship Program worked with eight major companies to voluntarily reduce their global emissions of certain types of perfluorinated chemicals by 95% by 2010 and eliminate these emissions by 2015.

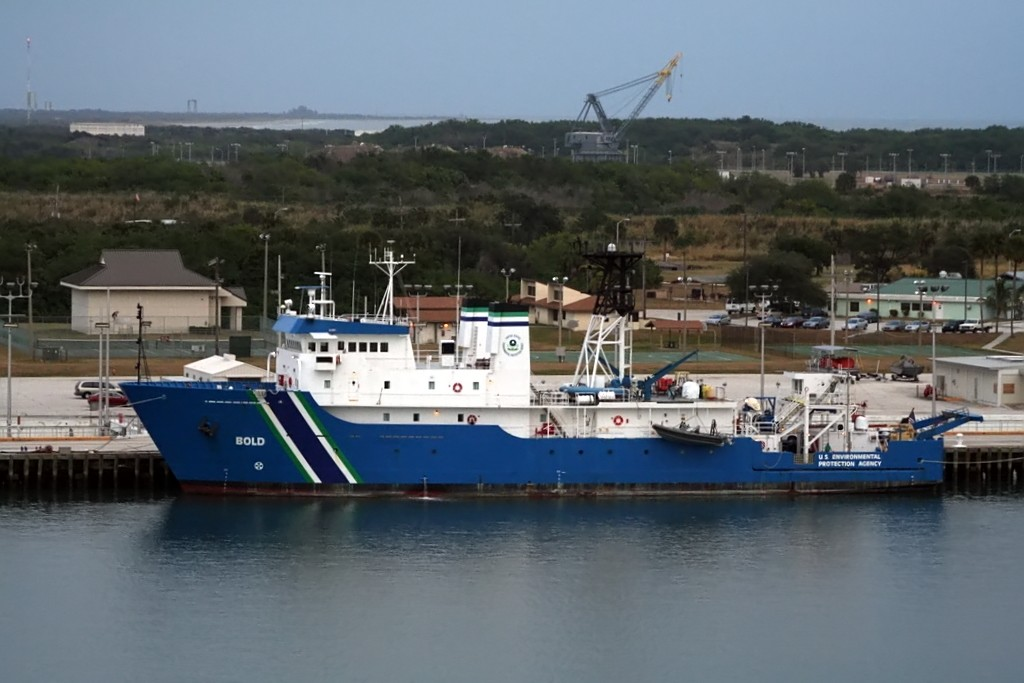
OSV Bold docked at Port Canaveral, Florida

- In March 2004, the U.S. Navy transferred USNS Bold (T-AGOS-12), a Stalwart class ocean surveillance ship, to the EPA. The ship had been used in anti-submarine operations during the Cold War, was equipped with sidescan sonar, underwater video, water and sediment sampling instruments used in study of ocean and coastline. One of the major missions of the Bold was to monitor for ecological impact sites where materials were dumped from dredging operations in U.S. ports. In 2013, the General Services Administration sold the Bold to Seattle Central Community College (SCCC), which demonstrated in a competition that they would put it to the highest and best purpose, at a nominal cost of $5,000.

== Controversies ==
=== Scope and fulfillment of agency's authority ===
Congress enacted laws such as the Clean Air Act, the Resource Conservation and Recovery Act, and CERCLA with the intent of preventing and reconciling environmental damages. Beginning in 2018 under Administrator Andrew Wheeler, EPA revised some pollution standards that resulted in less overall regulation.

Furthermore, the CAA's discretionary application has caused a varied application of the law among states. In 1970, Louisiana deployed its Comprehensive Toxic Air Pollutant Emission Control Program to comply with federal law. This program does not require pollution monitoring that is equivalent to programs in other states.

=== Environmental justice ===
The EPA has been criticized for its lack of progress towards environmental justice. Administrator Christine Todd Whitman was criticized for her changes to President Bill Clinton's Executive Order 12898 during 2001, removing the requirements for government agencies to take the poor and minority populations into special consideration when making changes to environmental legislation, and therefore defeating the spirit of the Executive Order. The EPA’s environmental justice work has developed in stages. In the 1990s and early 2000s, the agency focused on explaining what environmental justice meant and creating offices and programs to address pollution burdens in communities that were being disproportionately affected. In a March 2004 report, the inspector general of the agency concluded that the EPA "has not developed a clear vision or a comprehensive strategic plan, and has not established values, goals, expectations, and performance measurements" for environmental justice in its daily operations. Another report in September 2006 found the agency still had failed to review the success of its programs, policies, and activities toward environmental justice. Studies have also found that poor and minority populations were underserved by the EPA's Superfund program, and that this situation was worsening. Under the Trump administration (2017–2021 and again starting in 2025), many environmental justice programs were reduced or rolled back. During the Biden administration (2021–2025), EJ work expanded, especially through programs like Justice40.

In August 2022 the EPA was allotted a listed ~42.8 billion in funding from the Inflation Reduction Act (IRA) towards what the EPA classifies as "Advancing Environmental Justice", and published the statement "Through the Inflation Reduction Act, EPA will improve the lives of millions of Americans by reducing pollution in neighborhoods where people live, work, play, and go to school; accelerating environmental justice efforts in communities overburdened by pollution for far too long; and tackling our biggest climate challenges while creating jobs and delivering energy security."

In September 2022 EPA announced the creation of a new Office of Environmental Justice and External Civil Rights that reports directly to the EPA administrator. The new office has an expanded budget and staff with broader responsibilities than under the previous organizational arrangement. As of December 2025, the new administration had dismantled OEJECR and was in the process of laying off OEJECR personnel.

Under the current administration, the office has changed drastically. In February 2025, the EPA took its EJScreen mapping tool and all related training materials off its public website. EJScreen had helped people see environmental and demographic data to identify communities facing higher pollution levels. The Society of Environmental Journalists reported that this removal was part of a wider rollback of environmental justice and diversity resources across the agency’s online platforms. While older copies of EJScreen can still be found through independent archives, taking it off the EPA website made it much harder for the public to access important environmental equity data.

=== Environmental justice rollbacks (2025-) ===
In 2025, the Trump administration made broad changes to EPA that greatly reduced the agency’s ability to carry out environmental justice work. Many programs were paused or eliminated, and large numbers of EJ staff were removed from their positions. It can be objectively described as one of the most significant rollbacks of environmental justice capacity in the agency’s history.

In January 2025 the administration ended the Justice40 efforts with Executive Order 14148.

One of the most impactful changes involved the restructuring of the EPA's Office of Environmental Justice and External Civil Rights. The Washington Post reported that more than 450 employees working on environmental justice and diversity programs were told they would be fired or reassigned, which massively shut down its operations.

Additional staff removals followed soon after. Newsweek reported that at least 168 employees were placed on administrative leave after an executive order declared certain diversity, equity, and EJ programs “not related to the agency’s statutory duties.” Earlier that year, 139 employees had already been placed on leave after signing a letter during a federal workforce reduction effort.

At the same time, the EPA’s research division faced major cuts. According to The Guardian, these actions were part of a plan to defund the agency’s main research arm, with senior scientists calling the move “the obliteration of ORD.” Public broadcasters confirmed that by February 2025, many remaining EJ staff were on indefinite leave, and a senior employee described the office as “on life support.”

These staffing changes were paired with the suspension or closure of several environmental justice programs. The Guardian reported that mass layoffs across research and environmental divisions eliminated hundreds of EJ-related positions. The administration said these cuts were meant to refocus the EPA on “core statutory duties,” but many argued they stripped support from communities facing long-term pollution burdens.

Newsweek noted that new executive orders redefined the EPA’s mission to exclude EJ programs and community outreach grants, leaving historically ignored communities without federal assistance for pollution remediation or environmental cleanup. Supporters of the changes argued that the shift returned the agency to its traditional role and reduced supposedly unnecessary spending.

Experts and environmental groups warned in a Newsweek article that these rollbacks would have lasting consequences. Analysts pointed out that removing staff, ending grant programs, and limiting access to tools like EJScreen would make it much harder for vulnerable communities to get environmental data or seek legal fixes for unfair pollution exposure.

==== Influence of lobbying and economic interests ====
The Center for American Progress explained that industry lobbying and economic pressures likely played an important role in these rollbacks. Many large companies and trade groups do not support environmental justice tools because these tools make pollution patterns easy to see. When the public can clearly see where pollution is highest and which industries are responsible, there is often more pressure for stronger rules. These rules can lead to higher costs, stricter oversight, or legal actions that companies want to avoid. Because of this, industries often push federal agencies and lawmakers to limit or remove programs that increase transparency or help communities demand protection.

Weakening environmental justice programs reduces the amount of information available to the public and lowers the pressure on industries to follow stricter environmental standards. When staff positions are cut, grant programs end, or tools like EJScreen are removed, companies face fewer requirements that they have to meet. This situation benefits industries because it reduces their costs and the chances of facing enforcement. At the same time, it becomes harder for communities to learn about pollution in their area or to ask for government help. In our current administration, being a government system built to solely make the United States the economic powerhouse of the world, many injustices on a smaller scale go unnoticed.

Supporters of these cuts argued that reducing environmental justice programs would save money and make the EPA more efficient. They claimed that these programs were unnecessary or too expensive. However, research shows that most of the savings go to large industries rather than to the public. Communities affected by pollution often receive no benefit. Instead, they lose important protection and have fewer ways to understand or respond to environmental risks. Many of these communities already struggle with limited resources, so the loss of environmental justice makes their situation even more difficult.

=== Freedom of Information Act processing performance ===
In the latest Center for Effective Government analysis of 15 federal agencies which receive the most Freedom of Information Act (FOIA) requests, published in 2015 (using 2012 and 2013 data, the most recent years available), the EPA earned a D by scoring 67 out of a possible 100 points, i.e. did not earn a satisfactory overall grade.

=== Pebble Mine ===
Pebble Mine is a copper and gold mining project located in the southwest region of Alaska in the Bristol Bay region organized by Northern Dynasty Minerals. In 2014 the EPA released its statement on the impacts that mining would have on Bristol Bay and its tributaries. Among many things, the statement assesses geological, topographic, ecological, hydrological, and economic data and determined that mining could negatively impact the salmon population. Seeing as Bristol Bay and its watershed provides around 46% of the world's sockeye salmon, the EPA did not want to risk an ecological disaster. In July 2014, before Northern Dynasty Minerals had submitted its EIS, EPA's Region 10 office proposed restrictions pursuant to section 404(c) of the Clean Water Act, restrictions that would effectively prohibit the project. Northern Dynasty Minerals protested this decision and on July 18, 2014, in a published statement, Pebble Partnership CEO Tom Collier said that the project would continue its litigation against EPA; noted that the EPA's action was under investigation by the EPA inspector general and by the House Committee on Oversight and Government Reform; and noted that two bills were pending in Congress seeking to clarify that EPA did not have the authority to preemptively veto or otherwise restrict development projects prior to the onset of federal and state permitting. Collier's statement also said that EPA's proposal was based on outdated mining scenarios that were not part of the project's approach. Multiple journalists and organizations have reported on the controversy including the Natural Resources Defense Council in support of the cancelation of the project and John Stossel in support of the development of the mine. As of 2023, the mine remains a controversial topic.

On January 30, 2023, the EPA vetoed the mine.

=== Water quality in East Palestine, Ohio ===
Ohio governor Mike DeWine and administrator of the EPA Michael Regan drank tap water in East Palestine, Ohio, on February 3, 2023, after a train derailment to show that the water was safe. The derailment caused a fire and the release of toxic chemicals into the air and water making locals and environmental groups concerned for the quality of water in the area. Despite the EPA's assurance that the water is safe some residents do not trust the quality of the water and question its long-term effects.

This incident also raised environmental justice concerns. Many residents felt that their community did not receive clear information or enough support during the cleanup, and some believed that a wealthier and more prevalent town might have received faster action and more resources. Community members reported strong odors, health symptoms, and fear of long-term contamination, and they argued that their voices were not taken seriously. These concerns reflected broader environmental justice issues, where communities with fewer resources often struggle to get the same level of protection, transparency, and attention from state and federal agencies.

== See also ==
- Awards of the United States Environmental Protection Agency
- Environmental history of the United States
- Environmental policy of the United States
  - Environmental policy of the second Trump administration
- List of EPA whistleblowers
