= Commercial fishing =

Catching seafood for commercial profit

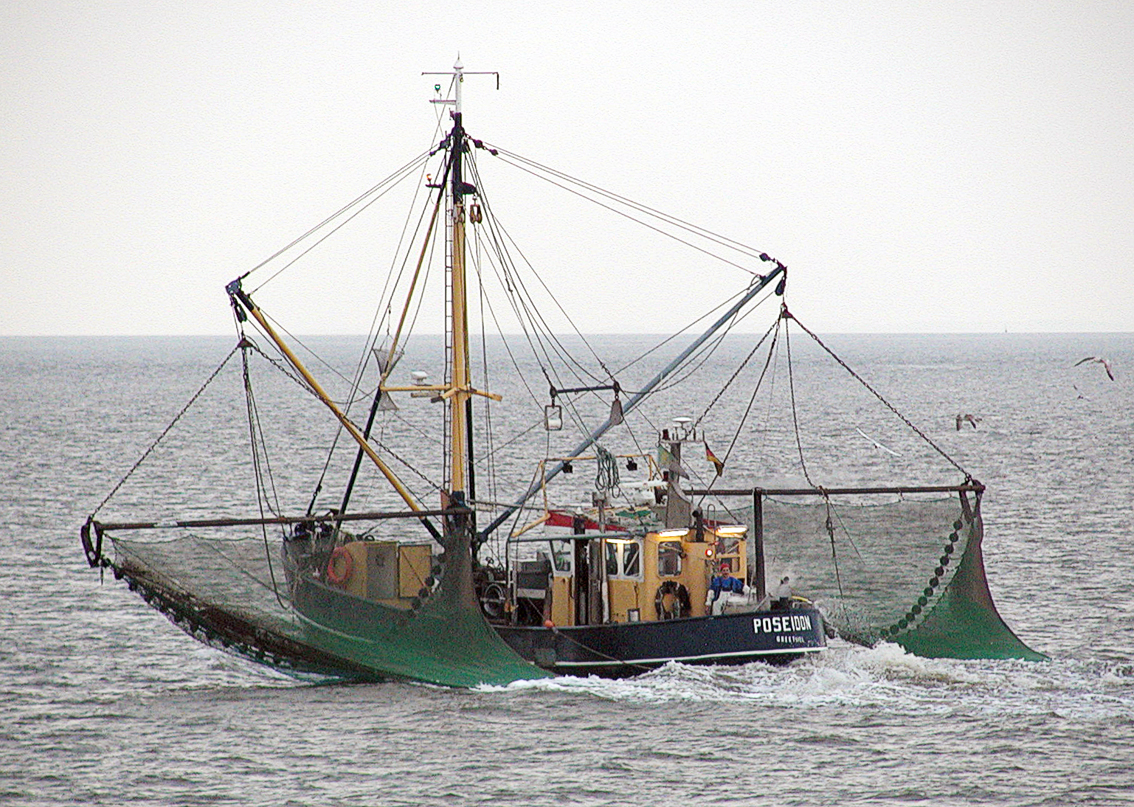
Commercial demersal fishing vessel in the North Sea

Commercial fishing is the activity of catching fish and other seafood for commercial profit, mostly from wild fisheries. It provides a large quantity of food to many countries around the world, but those who practice it as an industry must often pursue fish far into the ocean under adverse conditions. Large-scale commercial fishing is called industrial fishing.

The major fishing industries are not only owned by major corporations but by small families as well. In order to adapt to declining fish populations and increased demand, many commercial fishing operations have reduced the sustainability of their harvest by fishing further down the food chain. This process, often is referred to as "fishing down the food web," and raises serious concerns among scientists and fishery managers. Removing too many organisms from the lower levels of the food chain can disrupt entire ecosystems and threaten long-term sustainability.

Commercial fishermen harvest a wide variety of animals. However, a very small number of species support the majority of the world's fisheries; these include herring, cod, anchovy, tuna, flounder, mullet, squid, shrimp, salmon, crab, lobster, oyster and scallops. All except these last four provided a worldwide catch of well over a million tonnes in 1999, with herring and sardines together providing a catch of over 22 million metric tons in 1999. Many other species are fished in smaller numbers.

In 2016, of the 171 million tonnes of fish caught, about 88 percent or over 151 million tonnes were utilized for direct human consumption. This share has increased significantly in recent decades, as it was 67 percent in the 1960s. In 2016, the greatest part of the 12 percent used for non-food purposes (about 20 million tonnes) was reduced to fishmeal and fish oil (74 percent or 15 million tonnes), while the rest (5 million tonnes) was largely utilized as material for direct feeding in aquaculture and raising of livestock and fur animals, in culture (e.g. fry, fingerlings or small adults for ongrowing), as bait, in pharmaceutical uses and for ornamental purposes.

== Economics ==
The industry, in 2023 was able to generate over 319 billion dollars in sales and also provided 2.1 million jobs in the United States, according the NOAA's Fisheries Service. Although the industry is able to provided this many jobs the pay varies from season to season and boat to boat. Commercial fishing may offer an abundance of jobs, but the pay varies from boat to boat, season to season. Crab fisherman Cade Smith was quoted in an article by Business Week as saying, "There was always a top boat where the crew members raked in $50,000 during the three- to five-day king crab season—or $100,000 for the longer snow crab season". That may be true, but there are also the boats who do not do well; Smith said later in the same article that his worst season left him with a loss of 500 dollars.

Many people working in commercial fishing are self-employed, which means their income is directly tied to productivity and market demand. Over time this changes the fish targeted with the change in market demand and supply of the fish. In the UK, the technical term for this is share fisherman, which refers to anyone working without an employment contract, on a boat crewed by more than one person, and relying for their livelihood at least partly on a share of the profits or gross sales of the fishing boat's catch.

== Methods and gear ==
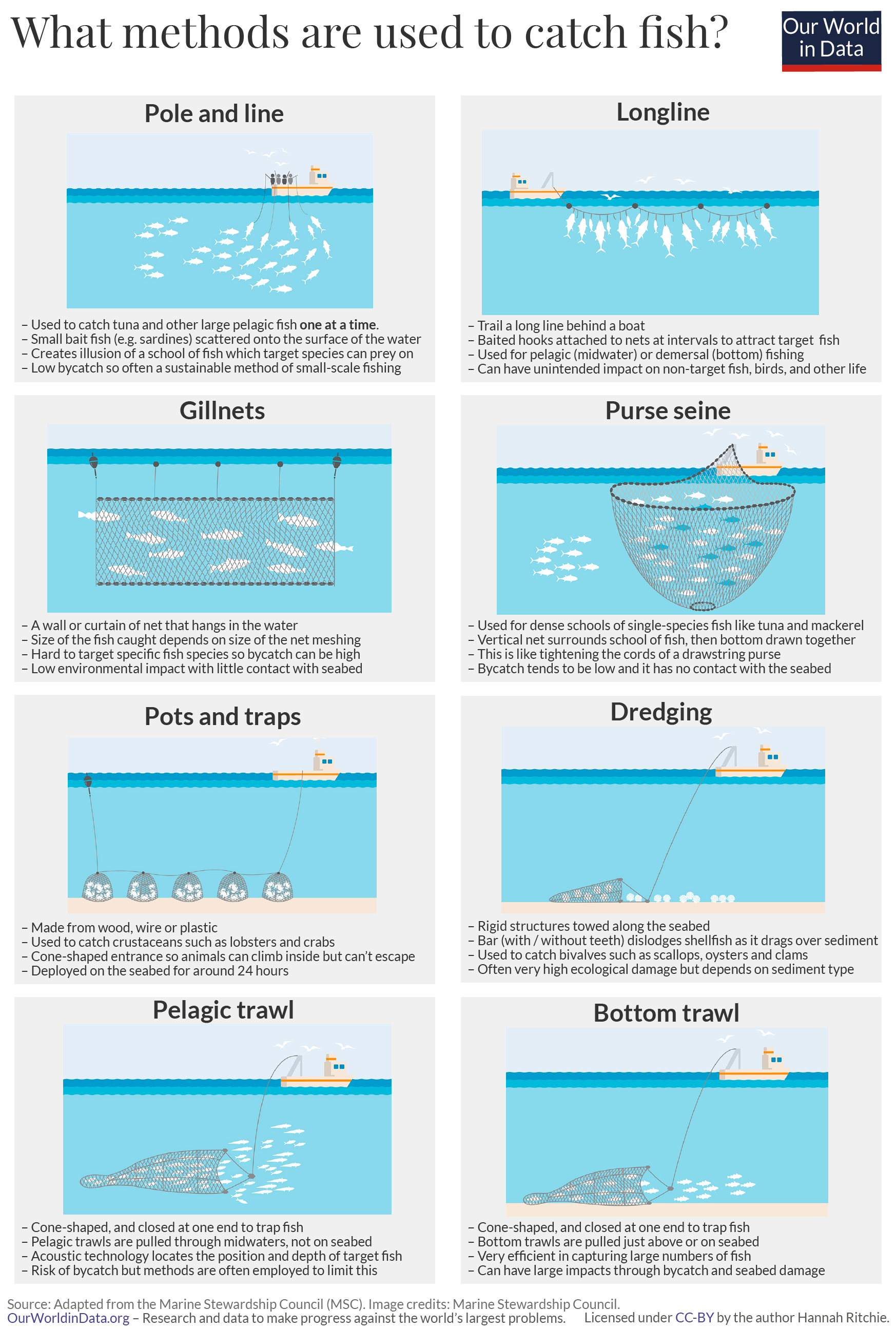
Major fishing techniques. Bottom trawling is destructive.

Commercial fishing uses many different methods to effectively catch a large variety of species including the use of pole and line, trolling with multiple lines, trawling with large nets such as seine-netting, and traps or pots. Sustainability of fisheries is improved by using specific equipment that eliminates or minimizes catching non-targeted species. Fishing methods vary according to the region, the species being fished for, and the technology available to the fishermen. A commercial fishing enterprise may vary from one man with a small boat with hand-casting nets or a few pot traps, to a huge fleet of trawlers processing tons of fish every day.

Commercial fishing gears in use today include surrounding nets (e.g. purse seine), seine nets (e.g. beach seine), trawls (e.g. bottom trawl), dredges, hooks and lines (e.g. long line and troll line), lift nets, gillnets, entangling nets, Pole and Line, and traps. Commercial fishing gear is specifically designed and updated to avoid catching certain species of animal that is unwanted or endangered. Millions of dollars are spent each year in researching/developing new techniques to reduce the injury and even death of unwanted marine animals caught by the fishermen. In fact, there was a study taken in 2000 on different deterrents and how effective they are at deterring the target species. The study showed that most auditory deterrents helped prevent whales from being caught while more physical barriers helped prevent birds from getting tangled within the net.

== Occupational health and safety ==
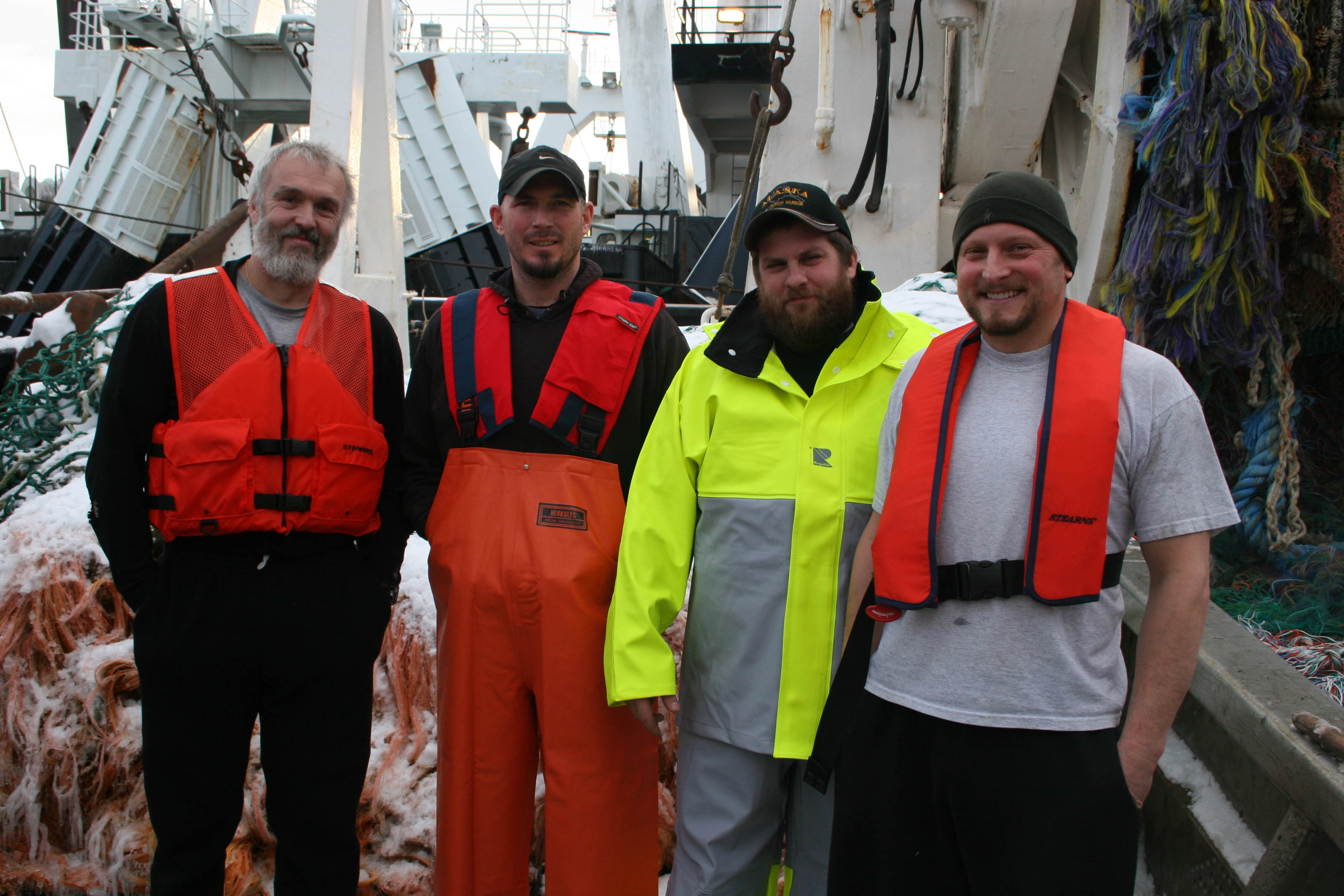
Trawl fishermen wearing personal flotation devices in a January 2009 trial

During 2010–2014, 188 commercial fishing fatalities occurred in the United States, with fatality rates in different fishing fleets ranging from 21 to 147 deaths per 100,000 full-time equivalent workers (FTEs), which is many times higher than the fatality rate for all U.S. workers. Between 1919 and 2005, 4111 fishermen died in fishing related accidents in the United Kingdom industry alone. These deaths are generally a result of a combination of severe weather conditions, extreme fatigue because any one fisherman usually puts in a 21-hour shift, and dangerous equipment. Commercial fishing has been identified by the National Institute for Occupational Safety and Health (NIOSH) as a priority industry sector in the National Occupational Research Agenda (NORA) to identify and provide intervention strategies regarding occupational health and safety issues.

From 2000-2019, 878 commercial fishermen died from a traumatic injury while fishing in the U.S. that is an average of 43 deaths per year. Nearly half of those deaths occurred after a vessel disaster and another 30 percent were due to falls overboard. The fatality rates in different fishing fleets ranging from 21 to 147 deaths per 100,000 full-time equivalent workers (FTEs), which is many times higher than the fatality rate for all U.S. workers. Between 1919 and 2005, 4111 fishermen died in fishing related accidents in the United Kingdom industry alone. These deaths are generally a result of a combination of severe weather conditions, extreme fatigue because any one fisherman usually puts in a 21-hour shift, and dangerous equipment. Commercial fishing has been identified by the National Institute for Occupational Safety and Health (NIOSH) as a priority industry sector in the National Occupational Research Agenda (NORA) to identify and provide intervention strategies regarding occupational health and safety issues.

=== Hazards and hazard controls ===
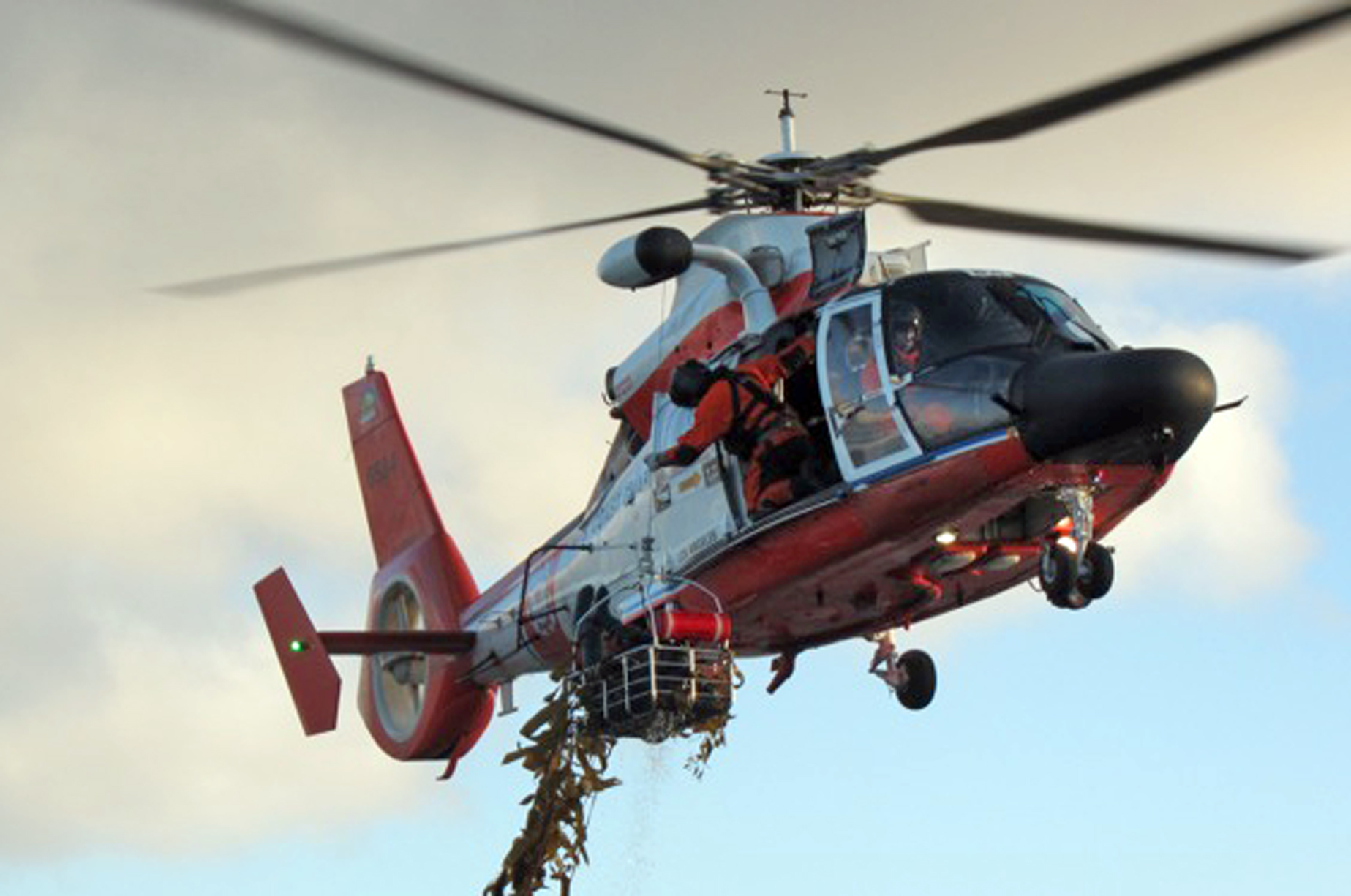
San Miguel Rescue - The Coast Guard Rescued Three Commercial Fishermen

Common causes of fishing-related deaths include vessel disasters, falls overboard, and onboard injuries.

Between 2000 and 2010, most vessel disasters often were initiated by flooding, vessel instability, and large waves, and that severe weather conditions contributed to a majority of fatal vessel disasters.

The most frequent cause of death is falls overboard. Falling overboard specifically killed 182 fishermen in the period between 2000 and 2010. This fatality rate is 3 times that of the next most dangerous job in the U.S. and more than 25 times that of the national average across all workers. Most falls overboard went unwitnessed, and in none of the cases documented was the victim wearing a personal flotation device (PFD). Several institutions have tried to change the culture surrounding safety on commercial fishing boats, especially around wearing personal flotation devices. The Alaska Scallop Association mandates that every fisherman must wear a PFD while on deck of the boat, and other organizations have purchased more wearable PFDs.

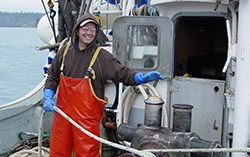
NIOSH prototype emergency stop (e-stop) being tested on the purse seiner F/V Lake Bay.

Onboard injuries often result when a crew member is caught in a line and pulled into a winch on deck. The installation of a readily accessible emergency stop switch on the winch can potentially prevent these kinds of injuries. Injury data collection systems have begun tracking fishing-related injuries (fatal and non-fatal), using publicly available reports such as news media.

=== Regulation ===
The U.S. Coast Guard has primary jurisdiction over the safety of the U.S. commercial fishing fleet, enforcing regulations of the U.S. Commercial Fishing Industry Vessel Safety Act of 1988 (CFIVSA). CFIVSA regulations focus primarily on saving lives after the loss of a vessel and not on preventing vessels from capsizing or sinking, falls overboard, or injuries on deck. CFIVSA regulations require that commercial fishing vessels carry various equipment (e.g., life rafts, radio beacons, and immersion suits) depending on the size of the vessel and the area in which it operates. Not all commercial fishermen follow safety regulations and advice. One study of Maine fishermen found that less than 25% of the fishermen interviewed had recent training in first aid or CPR, only 75% of the boats had survival suits and only 36% had a survival craft. Even the ships that did have the necessary equipment did not consistently have a captain that fully understood how to use the safety equipment.

== Environmental risk ==
The oceans cover nearly two thirds of the Earth's surface, and are continuously threatened by human behaviors and practices. By taking so many fish from the seas, humans have managed to remove entire links from the marine food chain. This causes a chain effect, leading to an overall upset of the delicate ecological balance.

Sharks are one of the ocean's most threatened groups (see list of threatened sharks) because they are mistakenly caught by vessels searching for fish, and end up getting tossed back into the ocean dead or dying Some Asian cuisines value shark fin as a delicacy, incentivizing excessive catching of sharks and even finning practice among unregulated fishermen. This disappearance of sharks has enabled prey animals like rays to multiply, which alters the food chain dynamics.

Bycatch is the industry term for what they consider "unwanted or economically-worthless aquatic animals who are unintentionally caught using destructively indiscriminate fishing methods like longlines and driftnets, which generally target marketable marine creatures such as tuna and swordfish" There are also billions of other animals that are killed in this manner every year such as: sea turtles, marine mammals, and sea birds. Between 1990 and 2008, it was estimated that 8.5 million sea turtles were fatally caught in nets or on longlines as bycatch.

Coral reefs are biodiversity-rich ecosystems which provide habitat for millions of aquatic species such as sponges, star fish, jellyfish, sea turtles, and countless species of fish and invertebrates. Reef ecosystems provide coastal protection, nutrient cycling and sources of food and income to many populations. Reef ecosystems are also highly sensitive to chemical, temperature, and population changes. There has been an increasing disappearance of large predators such as barracuda, Nassau groupers, and sharks The main reason behind the decline of these natural predators is due to over fishing or bycatch. This makes the reefs more vulnerable to invasion by non-native species. A study found that in the last half century there has been a 70% decline in sharks among coral reefs.

Fish farming is the raising of fish for food in underwater enclosures, otherwise known as aquaculture. There are environmental hazards such as waste, damage to ecosystems, and negative effects on humans. Because they are so densely packed together, the fecal matter that accumulates can create algal blooms, or deadly parasites and viruses that thrive on the filthy environment. These can infect wild fish that swim near the enclosure, or whole colonies of fish if an infected farm fish escapes the enclosure. Despite these concerns, advancements in sustainable aquaculture practices offer potential solutions for reducing pressure on natural fisheries.

Overfishing occurs because fish are captured at a faster rate than they can reproduce. Both advanced fishing technologies and increased demand for fish have resulted in overfishing. The Food and Agricultural Organization has reported that "about 25 percent of the world's captured fish end up thrown overboard because they are caught unintentionally (bycatch), are illegal market species, or are of inferior quality and size" It should not go unnoticed that overfishing has caused more ecological extinction than any other human influence on coastal ecosystems.

The global environmental problem of oceanic microplastics is largely caused by plastic-made fishing gear that is wearing down by use, lost or thrown away. This has become an increasing problem and threatens the lives of a lot of sea life. This can disrupt food webs, decrease fertility and harm biodiversity.

== See also ==
- Fishing industry
- List of harvested aquatic animals by weight
- List of canneries
- List of seafood companies
- Whaling

== Sources ==
This article incorporates text from a free content work. Licensed under CC BY-SA 3.0 IGO (license statement/permission). Text taken from In brief, The State of World Fisheries and Aquaculture, 2018, FAO, FAO.
