= John Finklea =

American physician (1933–2000)

John F. Finklea

Director of the National Institute for Occupational Safety and Health
- In office 1975–1978
- Preceded by: Marcus M. Key
- Succeeded by: Anthony Robbins

Personal details
- Born: August 27, 1933
- Died: December 22, 2000 (aged 67)
- Education: B.S., Davidson College; M.D. Medical University of South Carolina; M.S. and Ph.D. in public health, University of Michigan
- Profession: Public health administrator, physician, professor

John F. (Jack) Finklea was a physician, professor, researcher, and public health administrator notable for his leadership of the Environmental Protection Agency's National Center for Environmental Research and the National Institute for Occupational Safety and Health.

== Background ==
John Finklea, a native of Florence, South Carolina, earned his B.S. from Davidson College at Davidson, N.C., and his M.D. from the Medical University of South Carolina. He also received master's and doctorate degrees in public health from the University of Michigan. Finklea began his medical career as a physician and a professor at a series of medical schools. His interest in public health took root as he researched air pollution health hazards for the Federal government.

== EPA ==
From 1970 through 1974, Finklea served as head to the Environmental Protection Agency's National Environmental Research Laboratory in Durham, N.C. At the EPA, Finklea gained a reputation as an agitator (according to Business Week) for controversial research on the health effects of atmospheric sulfates from power plants. The research connected sulfur dioxide emissions to acid rain, a conclusion that rankled many in the power industry. He opposed the use of catalytic converters to control auto emissions because of their adverse environmental impact, a stand that directly conflicted with EPA policy. These controversies put pressure on Finklea to resign, which he did at the end of 1974.

== NIOSH ==
=== Appointment as director ===
Finklea took over as director of the National Institute for Occupational Safety and Health in April, 1975. He replaced Dr. Marcus M. Key, the Institute’s first director. Following Key's resignation, deputy director Edward Baier had served as acting director and many within the Institute expected Baier to be appointed to the post. Finklea took over NIOSH in the midst of Congressional complaints that NIOSH was too soft on industry, industry claims that NIOSH's research was sloppy, and organized labor accusations that NIOSH was overly slow in sharing important health data.

Finklea worked to accelerate health hazard research, especially in the chemical industry. Over Finklea's tenure, NIOSH identified 65 potentially dangerous substances found at job sites, as compared to the 23 such warnings issued during the first four years of NIOSH's existence. Within months of his appointment, Finklea had NIOSH issuing a steady stream of alerts on toxic substances.

Dr. Finklea had the reputation, which he had earned, of knowing everything that was going on in NIOSH research. When he was doing his quarterly "rounds" in Morgantown and Cincinnati, he would often stop random people and ask them where they worked. When they told him, he would tell them what project they worked on and how they were doing. He was a "hands-on" administrator, and he was missed when he left NIOSH.

=== Chemical identification ===
Under Finklea's leadership, NIOSH issued a register of 100 chemical compounds considered potential carcinogens. He encouraged cooperation between NIOSH, the Occupational Safety and Health Administration (OSHA), chemical process companies in the effort. His was one of several voices working to increase awareness for birth defects, miscarriages, and other reproduction-related problems stemming from chemical and radiological exposure. Additionally, Finklea called on Congress to adopt toxic substances legislation related to carcinogenic pesticides, and Kepone in particular.

=== Resource constraints ===
Finklea suggested that NIOSH did not have the resources to fully execute its mandate. For the millions of workers who Finklea claimed were at risk, NIOSH "would require the combined efforts of all government agencies involved in evaluating or regulating substances to which workers are exposed." He was forced to drop a number of projects because of budget and workforce constraints, among them a study of workplace stress.

With NIOSH's limited resources, Finklea chose to direct the researchers under him toward the completion of criteria documents—scientific literature surveys that determine the relative dangers of workplace substances. Preparation of the documents accounted for over 40% of NIOSH's budget.

=== Departure ===
After nearly three years as its director, John Finklea abruptly resigned. He did not publicly announce the departure or offer any specific reason. The Washington Post speculated that Finklea had been under pressure to resign because of what it called, "bureaucratic feuding". Finklea served temporarily as a special assistant to William Foege, director of the Centers for Disease Control and Prevention. His spot as director was filled on an acting basis by J. Donald Millar, who described NIOSH at that time as being afflicted with "alienation and conflict".

== University of Alabama ==
Finklea returned to academia at the University of Alabama as a professor of medicine at the medical school and as a professor of environmental sciences at the school of public health. He researched, among other things, the effects of welding gases and fumes. He was instrumental in establishing the University of Alabama Occupational Health Clinic. He retired from in 2000.

== CDC ==
In 1989, Finklea became assistant director of the Injury Control Program at the Centers for Disease Control in Atlanta, Georgia, and he chaired its research review committee.

== Personal life ==
In 1979, Finklea survived a coronary occlusion and bypass surgery. He had a second coronary occlusion and repeated bypass surgery in 1990.

== See also ==
- National Institute for Occupational Safety and Health
- Marcus M. Key
- Linda Rosenstock
