= Croupier =

Someone appointed at a gambling table to assist in the conduct of the game

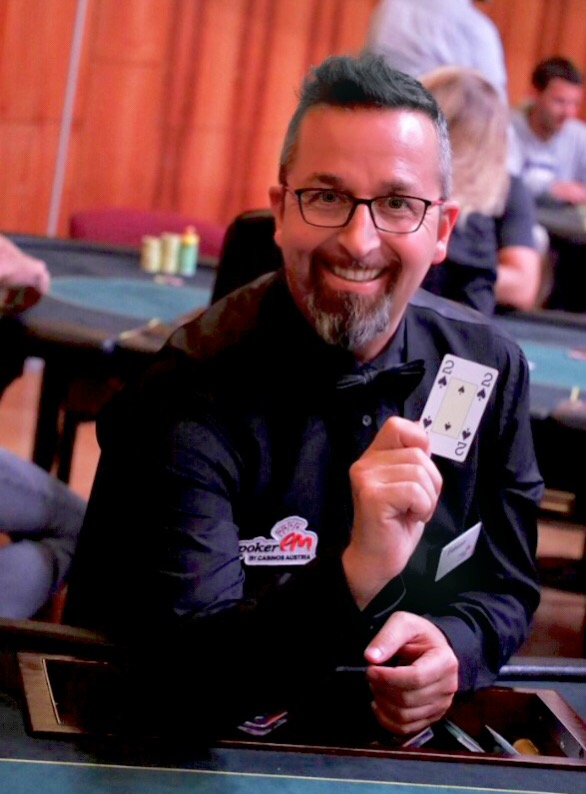
Croupier in Las Vegas (2011)

A croupier or dealer is someone appointed at a gambling table to assist in the conduct of the game, especially in the distribution of bets and payouts. Croupiers are typically employed by casinos.

== Origin of the word ==
Originally a "croupier" meant one who stood behind a gambler, with extra reserves of cash to back the gambler up during a gambling session. The word derived from croupe (the rump of a horse) and was by way of analogy to one who rode behind on horseback. It later came to refer to one who was employed to collect the money from a gaming-table.

Originally a "dealer" meant one who was responsible for distributing cards or the player in the dealer position, regardless of whether or not that player was responsible for distributing the cards.

== Training ==
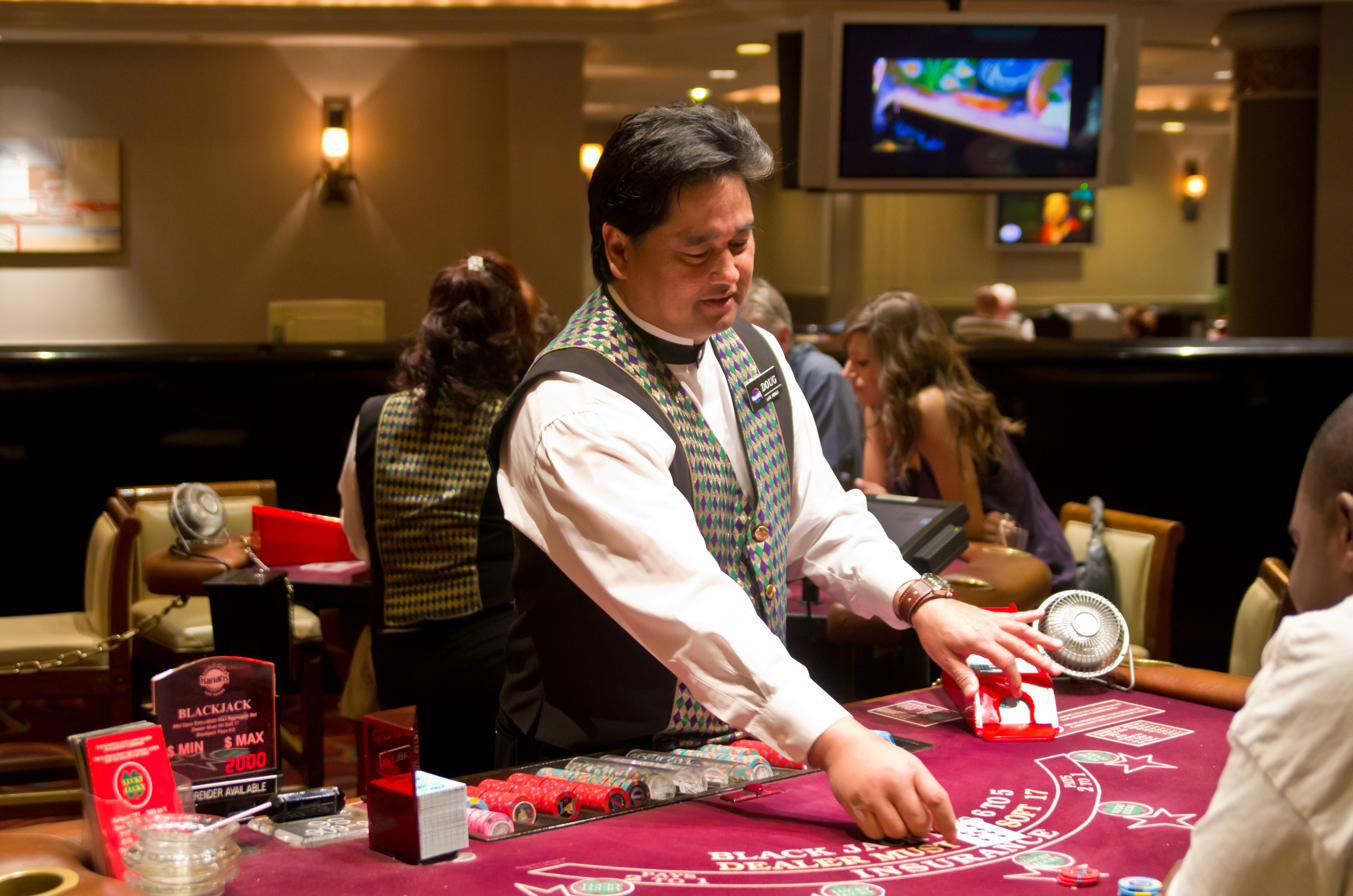
A blackjack dealer at Harrah's Las Vegas (2011)

Training methods to become a casino croupier vary from country to country. In North America, blackjack is almost always the game that dealers learn first, as it is simple and popular, and when the dealer makes errors, they tend not to cost the casino much money. In Europe, croupiers tend to learn roulette first. Complex, busy games such as craps, with complicated payout systems, etc., are usually reserved for the most competent and/or ambitious dealers.

== Licensing ==
American, Australian, Canadian and British croupiers are required to apply for a gambling license. This license includes police background checks and credit rating checks, to help determine if they are eligible to commence employment. Croupiers are not permitted to deal at a casino until being issued this license.

== Tipping ==
As is common with customer service staff in the United States, croupiers there depend on tips to make their wage worthwhile. While a croupier should theoretically have no personal interest in the outcome of the game, a successful player customarily tips the croupier, especially in American casinos. Tips are often pooled and divided amongst all the staff. Fraternising with customers is frowned upon (due to conflict of interest), and most casinos prevent their gambling staff from being seen smoking or even being seen in uniform outside the casino. Some gambling strategies include suggestions to tip the casino dealer in order to create a good atmosphere and improve the dealer's mood. According to these strategies, tipping might even make the dealer shuffle the cards less frequently and thereby allow easier tracking of particular cards. Australian casinos forbid dealers from taking tips.

== Secondhand smoke exposure ==
Because casinos tend to allow smoking on the gambling floor, American croupiers are exposed to secondhand smoke. A health hazard evaluation of several Las Vegas casinos showed that nonsmoker croupiers suffered from more respiratory ailments than their administrative counterparts at the casinos, and had cotinine and NNAL (both components of secondhand smoke) in their urine samples. The UK banned smoking in all public places, including casinos, in 2007.

== See also ==
- Poker dealer
