= J. Donald Millar =

American public health administrator (1934–2015)

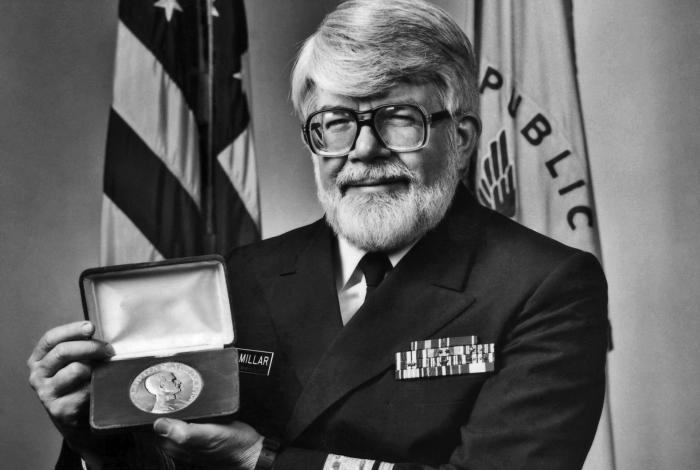
- J. Donald Millar, M.D., M.P.H., receiving the Gorgas Medal for his achievements in preventive medicine.

Director of the National Institute for Occupational Safety and Health
- In office 1981–1993
- Preceded by: Anthony Robbins
- Succeeded by: Linda Rosenstock

Personal details
- Born: John Donald Millar; February 27, 1934 Newport News, Virginia, U.S.
- Died: August 30, 2015 (aged 81) Murrayville, Georgia, U.S.
- Education: B.S., University of Richmond; M.D., Medical College of Virginia; D.T.P.H., London School of Hygiene and Tropical Medicine
- Profession: Physician, public health administrator, consultant, musician

John Donald Millar (February 27, 1934 – August 30, 2015) was a physician and public health administrator who rose to prominence as the director of the National Institute for Occupational Safety and Health from 1981 through 1993.

== Education ==
Donald Millar was born February 27, 1934, in Newport News, Virginia, to Dorothea (née Smith) and John Millar. Donald attended the University of Richmond, earning a B.S. in chemistry in 1956. He continued his education at the Medical College of Virginia. In 1957, he married Joan Phillips and two years later he completed his M.D. He completed his residency at the University of Utah in Salt Lake City.

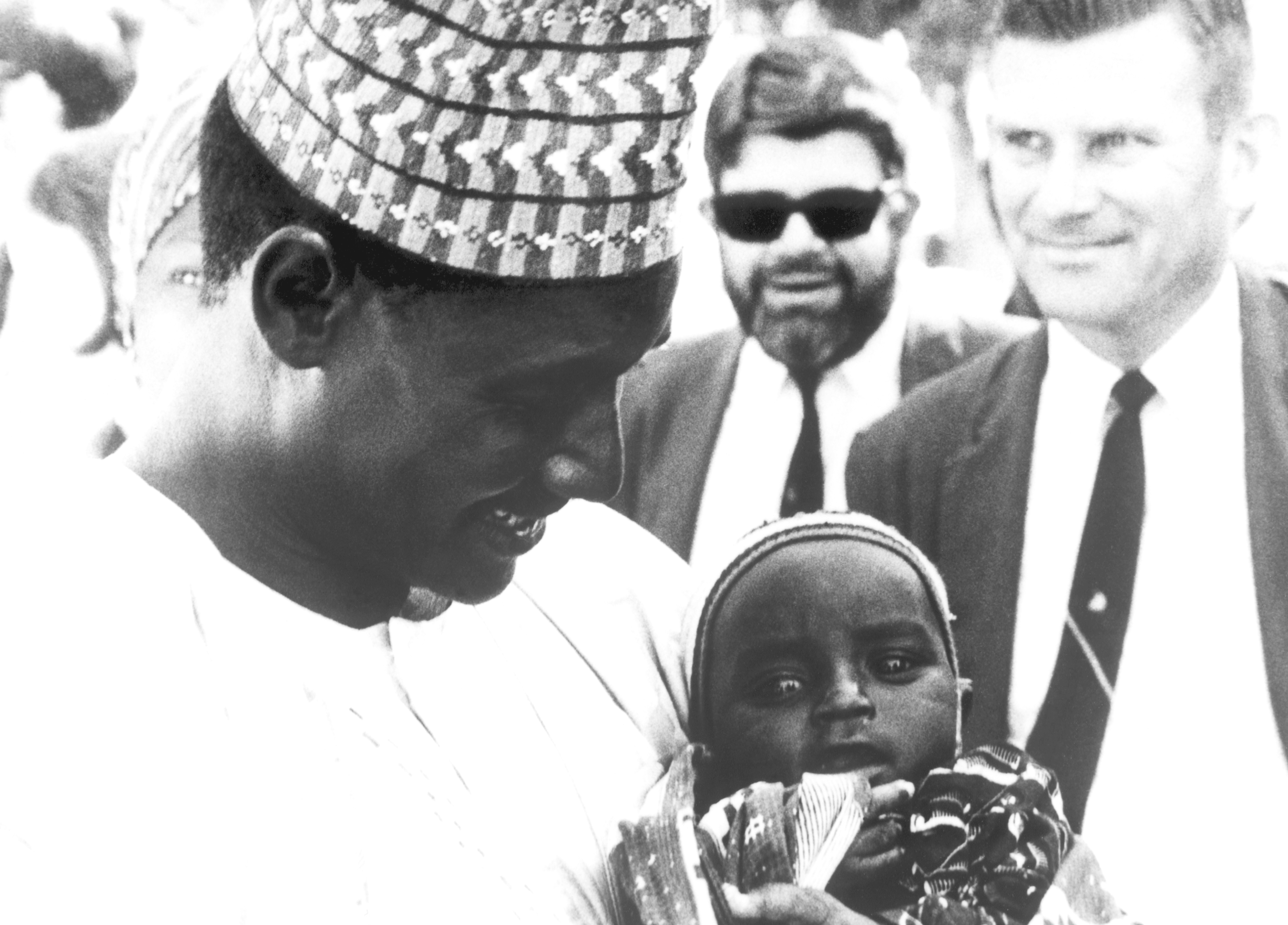
Millar (in sunglasses) present at the 100 millionth smallpox vaccination (1969)

Millar began working for the Centers for Disease Control and Prevention in 1961. Beginning in 1963 he directed CDC's Smallpox Eradication Program and its predecessors, an effort he led until 1970. In 1966, he was awarded a D.T.P.H. (Lond.)—a degree equivalent to a Master's of Public Health degree in the United States—from the London School of Hygiene and Tropical Medicine.

== Early career ==
Millar began working for the National Institute for Occupational Safety and Health under then-director John Finklea. Finklea was the institute's second director. Since taking over the head spot in 1975 from Dr. Marcus M. Key, Finklea had tried to change the institute's direction, taking a more aggressive approach than Key had. Finklea began to feel pressure to resign from stakeholders inside and outside of the organization. He resigned abruptly in March, 1978, which left Millar as NIOSH's acting director. Millar held the post, sorting out conflicts within the institute, until Anthony Robbins was appointed director 1979. Following Robbins's appointment, Millar was hired as the director of the National Center for Environmental Health (NCEH). He served in that capacity until Robbins resigned in 1981. Millar was appointed in his place as director of NIOSH, a position he held until 1993.

== NIOSH Director ==
In his more than decade as director of NIOSH, Millar established the Institute as a mature organization. He expanded NIOSH's focus beyond chemical hazards, an area which had consumed the attention of his predecessors. He led studies concerning such varied topics as vibration syndrome (caused by vibrating tools such as pneumatic hammers and gasoline chain saws); electrocution from metal ladders being too near power lines; and occupational fatalities in confined spaces. His approach to occupational safety was typified by his manner of addressing tractor rollovers, which he referred to as an "occupational obscenity". He advocated the use of a rollover protective structure (ROPS) on every tractor in use, saying, "There is no scientific excuse for the persistence of this problem. This is something we know how to prevent".

In addition to his work at NIOSH, Millar chaired the executive committee of the National Toxicology Program (NTP) from 1989 to 1993. He maintained an adjunct professorship of occupational and environmental health at the Rollins School of Public Health at Emory University in Atlanta (1988–1998). He served on a panel of occupational health experts for the World Health Organization, and he continued his efforts to eradicate smallpox. In 1987, he was presented with the Gorgas Medal from the Association of Military Surgeons of the United States (AMSUS).

For his work, Dr. Millar has been twice honored with the Distinguished Service Medal (1983 and 1989), highest honor bestowed by the United States Public Health Service. He was named Honorary Fellow of the Faculty of Occupational Medicine, Royal College of Physicians, London (U.K.). He received the William S. Knudsen Award from the American College of Occupational and Environmental Medicine for "outstanding contributions to occupational medicine." In 1993, Millar was given the William Steiger Memorial Award from the American Conference of Governmental Industrial Hygienists, the Health Watch Award for "outstanding contributions toward improving the health of minority populations", and the Surgeon General's Medallion for "exceptional skill and fortitude."

== Workplace health consultant ==
Millar retired from NIOSH and the US Public Health Service with the rank of Rear Admiral in 1993, turning his directorship over to Linda Rosenstock. He started a consulting company in 1993, Don Millar & Associates, Inc., in Murrayville, GA. As president of the company, Millar provided his services in the occupational and environmental health industry. He chaired several scientific panels and workshops, and served as vice chairman of the Public Health Policy Advisory Board (PHPAB), a Washington "think-tank" fostering science-based public health policy. He also served on editorial and advisory boards of the American Journal of Industrial Medicine, the American Journal of Preventive Medicine, and the Journal of Occupational Health Psychology.

== Personal ==
Millar was an accomplished musician who was part of the DeKalb Symphony Orchestra, Gainesville, GA; the Truett-Mcconnell College Wind Symphony; and the Toccoa Symphony Orchestra. He enjoyed sailing and was an amateur Civil War historian. He and Joan had three children. He died of kidney failure on August 30, 2015.
