= Anthony Robbins (NIOSH director) =

Occupational health and safety expert (1941–2026)

Director of the National Institute for Occupational Safety and Health
- In office 1978–1981
- Preceded by: John Finklea
- Succeeded by: J. Donald Millar

Personal details
- Born: January 14, 1941 New York City, U.S.
- Died: July 5, 2026 (aged 85) Rockport, Massachusetts, U.S.
- Education: Harvard College (BA); Harvard Kennedy School (MPA); Yale School of Medicine (MD)
- Profession: Public health administrator

Anthony William Robbins (January 14, 1941 – July 5, 2026) was an American public health administrator, health policy expert, editor and academic. He headed state health departments in Vermont and Colorado between 1971 and 1978. He was the director of the U.S. National Institute for Occupational Safety and Health from 1978 to 1981, and worked on the senior health staff of the U.S. House Energy and Commerce Committee from 1981 to 1986. He later became a professor at the Tufts University School of Medicine. From 1994 to 1999, he was editor in chief of Public Health Reports. From 2003 to 2019 he co-edited the Journal of Public Health Policy.

== Early years and education ==
Robbins was born in Manhattan on January 14, 1941. He completed a bachelor's degree in biochemical sciences from Harvard University in 1962. He graduated from Yale School of Medicine in 1967 and completed a master's degree in public administration from the Harvard Kennedy School in 1969. He served an internship in internal medicine but chose a career in progressive health policy.

== Career ==
Robbins was the state health commissioner from 1971 to 1976 in Vermont, where he helped conceive and secured federal funding for a supplemental food program for low-income women, infants and children. During his tenure Vermont also became the first U.S. state to provide publicly financed dental care to low-income families. He held a similar position in Colorado from 1976 to 1978.

Robbins became director of the National Institute for Occupational Safety and Health in 1978. He advised the White House on the government's response to the Three Mile Island nuclear accident in Pennsylvania in 1979. In 1981, accused by the Reagan administration of being too closely aligned with organized labor, he was abruptly fired from his position and stripped of his commission in the Public Health Service.

In 1983, Robbins was elected president of the American Public Health Association. From 1981 to 1986 he was a member of the senior health staff of the U.S. House Energy and Commerce Committee, where he helped negotiate enhanced warning labels on cigarette packages and helped draft legislation leading to the National Vaccine Program. From 1993 to 1994 he took leave from a professorship of public health at Boston University to direct the first national vaccine plan for the Clinton administration.

From 1994 to 1999, Robbins was editor in chief of Public Health Reports, the journal of the U.S Public Health Service. In 1999 he became a professor at the Tufts University School of Medicine, where he was chair of the Department of Family Medicine and Community Health from 1999 to 2002. From 2003 to 2019, he co-edited the Journal of Public Health Policy with his wife, Phyllis Freeman.

== Death ==
Robbins died at his home in Rockport, Massachusetts, on July 5, 2026, at age 85.
