= National Firefighter Registry for Cancer =

Registry of firefighters used to evaluate cancer risk

Program overview
- Formed: July 7, 2018
- Parent agency: U.S. National Institute for Occupational Safety and Health
- Website: https://www.cdc.gov/NFR

The National Firefighter Registry (NFR) for Cancer is a voluntary registry of firefighters in the United States that aims to assess cancer rates and risk factors in the U.S. fire service. The NFR collects relevant occupational, lifestyle, and health information from firefighters through an online questionnaire. The goal of the NFR is to use these data to reduce cancer in firefighters.

The NFR was created by the Firefighter Cancer Registry Act of 2018 in response to growing evidence of carcinogenic exposures (substances that can cause cancer) and increased risk for cancer faced by firefighters. It opened to firefighter for registration in April 2023. The NFR is maintained by the U.S. National Institute for Occupational Safety and Health (NIOSH).

== Background ==
=== Cancer among firefighters ===
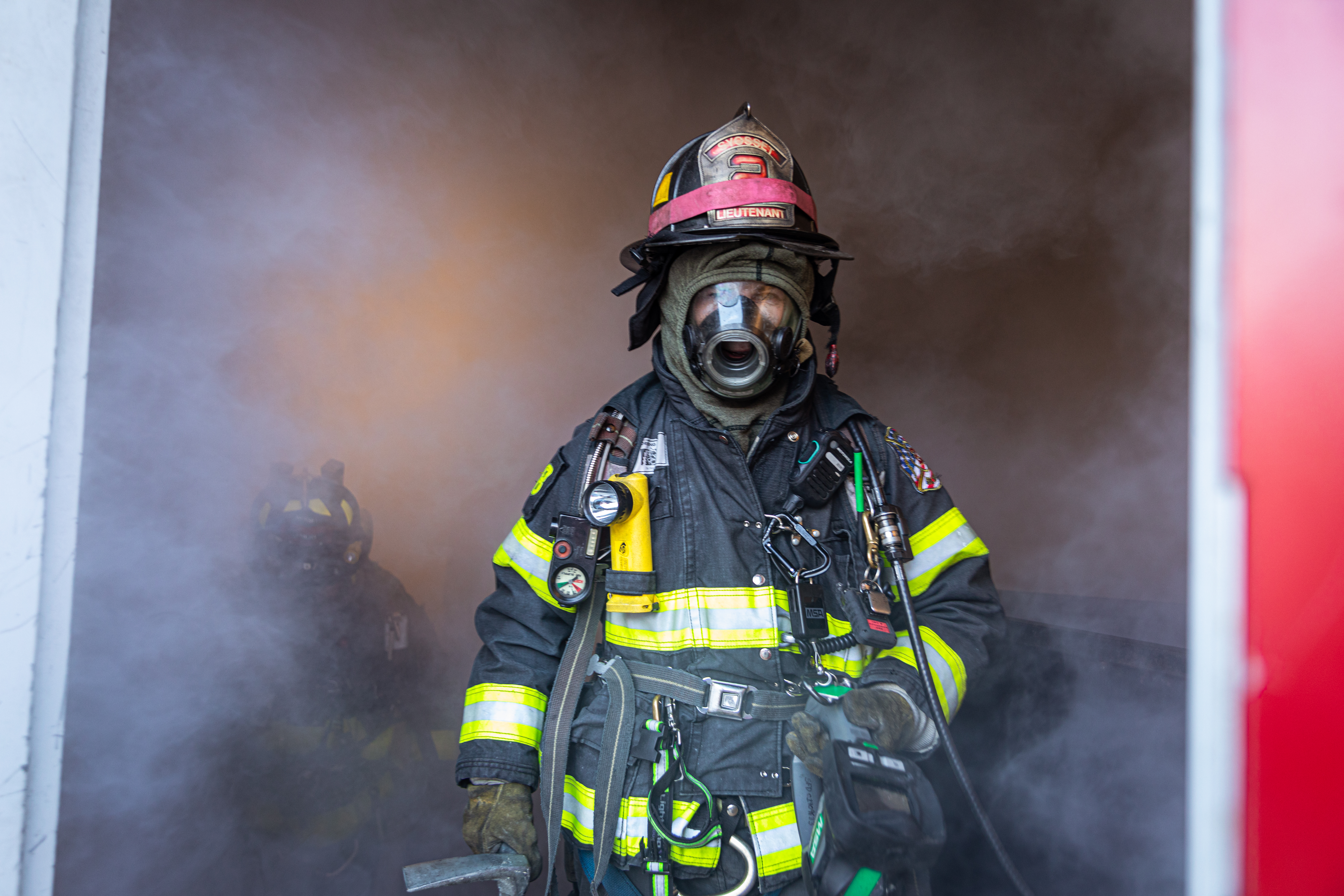
Photo 1: A firefighter exits a burning building

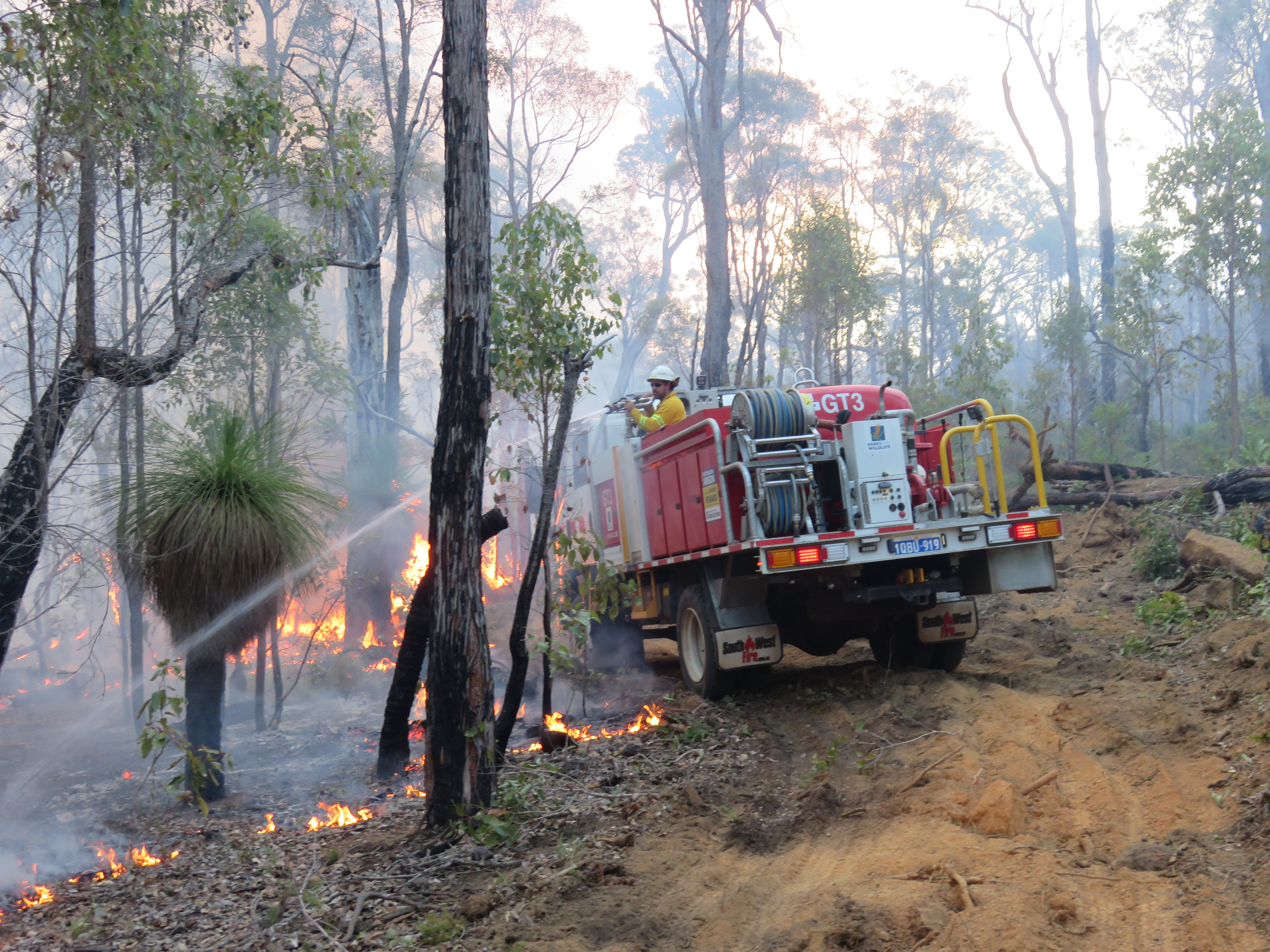
Photo 2: Firefighter using a water hose on a fire truck to extinguish a portion of a forest fire

Cancer risk in the U.S. fire service is a topic of growing concern. Firefighters regularly encounter carcinogenic materials—which can cause cancer—and hazardous contaminants on the fireground. Several studies have documented airborne and/or skin exposures to carcinogenic substances during firefighting, as well as contamination on turnout gear and other equipment worn by firefighters. Some of these compounds can absorb into firefighters' bodies. Some firefighters also work with hazardous materials and are trained to control and clean up dangerous materials such as oil spills and chemical accidents. In addition to chemical exposures, night shift work has been classified by the International Agency for Research on Cancer (IARC) as a probable human carcinogen.

Recent studies suggest that exposure on the fireground may increase risk to firefighters of certain types of cancer and other chronic diseases. In addition to epidemiological studies, several mechanistic studies using biomarkers have found evidence of DNA damage, oxidative stress, and epigenetic changes related to firefighters' exposures.

Unlike structural firefighters, wildland firefighters typically do not wear respiratory protection, and may inhale particulate and other compounds emitted by the wildfires. A risk assessment conducted using an exposure–response analysis concluded that wildland firefighters have an increased risk of dying from lung cancer and cardiovascular disease.

In 2022, IARC completed an evaluation on the carcinogenicity—the ability of a substance or agent to cause cancer—of the occupation of firefighting. IARC reached a consensus that occupational exposure as a firefighter is a known human carcinogen based on sufficient evidence for increased risk of mesothelioma and bladder cancer among firefighters.

- Limited evidence of increasing risk among firefighters was also found for five other cancers:
- Colon cancer
- Prostate cancer
- Testicular cancer
- Melanoma of the skin
- Non-Hodgkin lymphoma.

=== Rationale for the NFR ===
Cancer is a nationally notifiable condition, and thus all U.S. states track diagnoses of cancer in a state cancer registry. While U.S. state cancer registries provide rich data for studying cancer in the U.S., they often do not provide comprehensive information on cancer patients' work history and workplace practices. These limitations, make it challenging to use data from state cancer registries alone to study cancer in firefighters. It is also important to collect information on personal and lifestyle risk factors (e.g. tobacco and alcohol use, sleep deprivation, diet, and physical activity) in the U.S. fire service to better understand how they may affect the relationship between firefighting and cancer.

Due to the lack of central and comprehensive sources of data, research on cancer rates amongst firefighters has been challenging. Although some evidence suggests the risk for specific cancer types could vary for male, female, and non-white firefighters, the strength of the evidence related to cancer in demographic subgroups is limited because many previous studies have mainly included white male firefighters. Larger studies of female firefighters and racial and ethnic minority groups are needed before conclusions can be drawn about cancer risk across the nation's diverse fire service.

== Creation ==
Firefighter Cancer Registry Act of 2018
- Long title: An Act to require the Secretary of Health and Human Services to develop a voluntary registry to collect data on cancer incidence among firefighters
- Enacted by: the 115th United States Congress

Citations
- Public law: Pub. L. 115–194 (text) (PDF) 42 U.S.C. § 280e-5

The Firefighter Cancer Registry Act of 2018 was introduced in the U.S. House of Representatives on February 7, 2017. This federal legislation required the Centers for Disease Control and Prevention (CDC) to create a registry designed to collect data on cancer rates among U.S. firefighters. The bill was passed with unanimous and bipartisan approval on July 7, 2018.

The main goal of the NFR, according to the text of the law, is "to develop and maintain…a voluntary registry of firefighters to collect relevant health and occupational information of such firefighters for purposes of determining cancer incidence." According to the Republican Policy Committee's summary, the NFR aims to provide decision makers with data to help them create new protocols to protect firefighters. It aims to register around 200,000 firefighters across a variety of demographics within five years of launch.

== Operation ==
Video made by NIOSH explaining how the NFR works.

The NFR opened to firefighters for registration in April 2023. As of December 2024, over 17,000 firefighters had signed up via the online portal.

NIOSH recruits firefighters to join the NFR through various communication channels (e.g., NFR website and newsletter, social media, local/state/national unions, affinity groups, trade journals, and conference attendees) and directly from selected rosters of firefighters.

The NFR plans to also seek additional details about participant's types of emergency responses attended and exposures by working with fire departments and exposure tracking programs (if applicable), and by administering follow-up questionnaires to registered firefighters. Because cancer has a long latency period – which is the time between exposure to carcinogens and the development of cancer – the NFR will monitor cancer outcomes for decades.

NIOSH maintains the NFR and receives input and guidance from the NFR Subcommittee, a subcommittee of the NIOSH Board of Scientific Counselors (a Federal Advisory Committee), consisting of 12 rotating subject matter experts in firefighting, epidemiology, medicine, or public health.

=== Firefighter enrollment ===
Participation in the NFR is open to all U.S. firefighters aged 18 and older, including:

- Active, former, and retired ones
- Career, paid-on-call, and volunteer firefighters
- Structural firefighters
- Wildland firefighters
- Industrial firefighters
- Military firefighters
- Instructors
- Fire investigators
- Other fire service members

To complete enrollment in the NFR, firefighters access the NFR enrolment portal through (https://nfr.cdc.gov) to set up an account, sign a consent document, complete a user profile, fill out the enrollment questionnaire.

NIOSH states that the information gathered through the program is only accessible to NIOSH researchers and is protected with multi-factor authentication and "multiple layers of encryption."

The enrollment questionnaire will collect information on employment/workplace characteristics, exposure, demographics, lifestyle factors, comorbidities, and other confounders. Most questions are optional. The enrollment process, including the questionnaire, is designed to take 30–45 minutes to complete if all questions are answered. Following enrollment, NIOSH sends NFR participants notifications for periodic voluntary follow-up questionnaires (e.g., one per year) to be filled out through the web portal.

NIOSH can then use this information to track past and future diagnoses of cancer among NFR participants by matching with data from state cancer registries to understand how firefighters' work impacts their risk of developing cancer.

=== Incident records ===
To complement the information gathered directly from firefighters, NIOSH will request fire incident records dating back to January 1, 2010, or earlier when available, from fire departments for some participants. Fire departments are required to collect some basic information about fire incidents under the National Fire Incident Reporting System (NFIRS) established by the U.S. Fire Administration. (The U.S. Fire Administration is in the process of replacing NFIRS with a new system called the National Emergency Response Information System (NERIS).) Department incident records will provide NIOSH scientists with apparatus and incident-specific information to be used for exposure-response analyses.

Specific variables of interest requested from department incident records may include incident number, fire station, apparatus, incident type (e.g., structure fire, car fire, etc.), on scene time, off scene time, job assignments, number of fire runs, and duration at fires. NIOSH will explore the most efficient and least burdensome way of obtaining incident records from participating fire departments.
