= Marcus M. Key =

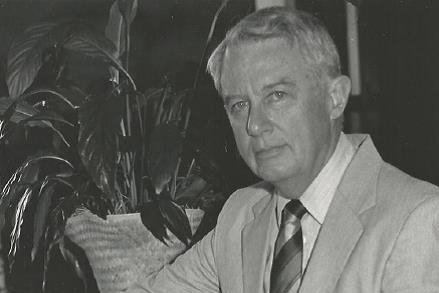

Director of the National Institute for Occupational Safety and Health, Assistant Surgeon General of the United States
- In office 1971–1974
- Preceded by: First to hold this office
- Succeeded by: John Finklea

Personal details
- Born: March 2, 1924 Lakeland, Florida, USA
- Died: October 31, 2020 (aged 96) Irvington, Virginia, USA

Marcus Malvin Key was a public health administrator and practitioner who served as the first director for the National Institute for Occupational Safety and Health (NIOSH) in the U.S. government.

== Education and early career ==
Key attended public schools in Lakeland, Florida and Little Rock, Arkansas. He studied at Columbia University beginning in 1941, but in 1943 his studies were interrupted by military service in World War II. He served in the 20th Air Force as a B-29 navigator and radar navigator-bombardier, flying ten combat missions in the Pacific including the "Last Mission" of the bombing of the Nippon Oil Company at Akita on Aug. 14, 1945.

He returned to Columbia University in 1947, earning his A.B. in 1949 and M.D. in 1952. He then earned a Master of Industrial Health at the Harvard University School of Public Health in 1954. He was an Assistant Resident in Dermatology at Presbyterian Hospital in New York City during 1954–56, and a Clinical Fellow in Dermatology at Cincinnati General Hospital during 1956–58.

He became a Medical Officer in the Division of Occupational Health, the predecessor of NIOSH, in 1956. He became Assistant Chief of the Dermatology Section in 1960 and its Chief in 1965. He became Chief of Clinical Services and Acting Chief of the Appalachian Laboratory for Occupational Respiratory Diseases in 1967. As part of the Public Health Service reorganizations of 1966–1973, the Division of Occupational Health became the Bureau of Occupational Safety and Health; Key became its deputy director in 1968 and its director in 1969.

== NIOSH ==
The Occupational Safety and Health Act of 1970, signed by President Richard Nixon, gave new responsibilities to the Department of Health, Education, and Welfare (HEW), including the mandate to perform research on occupational safety and health problems, hazard evaluation, toxicity determinations, manpower development and training.

The Act established the National Institute for Occupational Safety and Health, and Marcus M. Key was appointed as the new Institute's first director. Previously Key had been the Assistant Surgeon General and director of the Bureau of Occupational Safety and Health. At NIOSH, Key oversaw 475 employees and worked with an initial budget of $17.8 million.

In 1974, B.F. Goodrich Chemical Company contacted NIOSH concerning deaths and illnesses in its Louisville factory. After a coordinated investigation, Key issued recommendations for exposure limits to vinyl chloride. His published recommendation suggested that vinyl chloride used in the factory resulted in four fatalities from angiosarcoma of liver. By 1975, Dr. Key had resigned as director and was eventually replaced by John Finklea, who had overseen the Environmental Protection Agency's national laboratory in Durham, N.C.

== University of Texas ==
Key began teaching at the University of Texas School of Public Health. In 1985, he was contacted by Labor Secretary Bill Brock about heading the Occupational Safety and Health Administration (OSHA). After considering the post, Key opted to continue with his professorship, where he continued until his retirement in 1994.

In September 2013 Shell Oil Company partnered with the University of Texas School of Public Health to endow the Marcus M. Key, M.D.-Shell Occupational and Environmental Health Endowed Chair in honor of Key to provide funding to recruit and retain senior faculty in the school’s Occupational Medicine Program of the Division of Epidemiology, Human Genetics and Environmental Science.
