= John Howard (NIOSH director) =

American physician and public health administrator

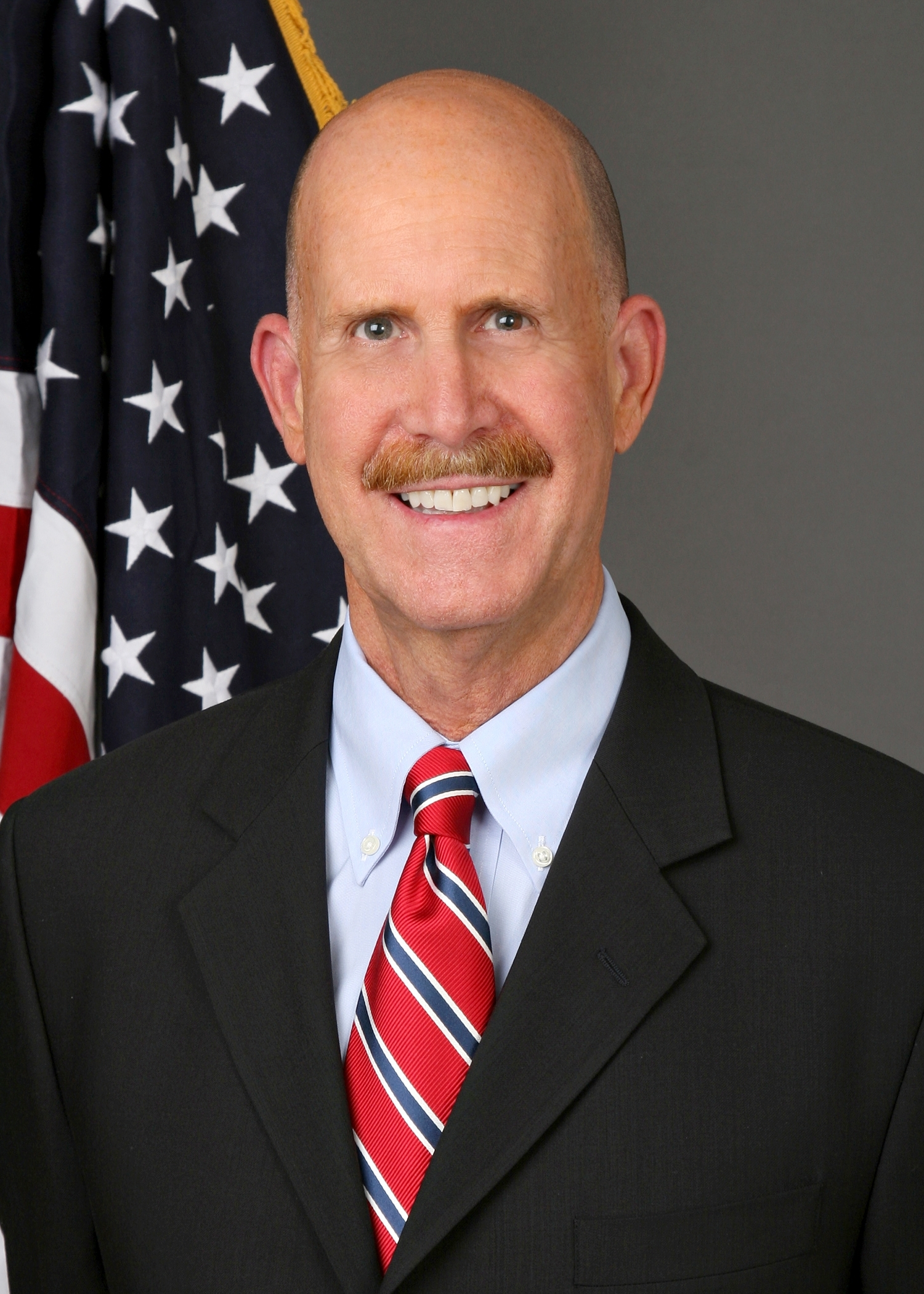

Director of the National Institute for Occupational Safety and Health
- In office 2002–2008, 2009–present
- Preceded by: Linda Rosenstock

Personal details
- Born: John Jackson Howard
- Education: MD, Loyola University; MPH, Harvard; JD, UCLA; LLM and MBA, George Washington University
- Profession: Physician, attorney, public health administrator
- Known for: Director of NIOSH, Chief of Cal/OSHA

John Jackson Howard is an American physician, attorney, and public health administrator who served a 6-year term as the director of the National Institute for Occupational Safety and Health and was appointed to be a special coordinator to respond to the health effects of the September 11 attacks. In this role, Howard advocated for rescue workers, introducing a program to provide screening, medical exams, and treatment for them. In 2009, Howard was again appointed as director of NIOSH and as World Trade Center Programs coordinator for HHS. In 2011, Howard became the Administrator of the World Trade Center Health Program. In 2016, he became the first person to be appointed to a third 6-year term as NIOSH director, and was reappointed to a fourth term in 2021.

== Education ==
John Howard received a doctor of medicine degree from Loyola University Chicago in 1974 (cum laude). To this he added a Master of Public Health from the Harvard School of Public Health in 1982. In 1986, Howard earned a Juris Doctor from the University of California, Los Angeles (UCLA), and a Master of Laws in Administrative Law and Economic Regulation from The George Washington University in 1987. He received a Master of Business Administration in Healthcare Management, also from George Washington University, in 2016. In addition, Howard is a board-certified occupational medicine physician and has written numerous papers on occupational health law and policy.

== Career ==
Howard began his career in occupational health in 1979 as an internist at the UCLA School of Medicine pulmonary fellowship program at Cedars-Sinai Medical Center. His clinical work involved asbestos-exposed shipyard workers, and he published research findings related to workplace exposure and occupational lung disease. He served as a medical director and chief clinician at the Philip Mandelker AIDS Prevention Clinic in Los Angeles. He also worked as an assistant professor of environmental and occupational medicine at the University of California, Irvine.

Howard served as the chief of the Division of Occupational Safety and Health in California's Department of Industrial Relations from 1991 to 2002. He administered a staff of nearly 1,000 and all the state's occupational and public safety programs. Through his administration of the division, Howard bolstered his reputation in the field. He served in this capacity for more than a decade.

== National Institute for Occupational Safety and Health ==
Linda Rosenstock resigned in November 2000 as the director of the National Institute for Occupational Safety and Health. The position was not filled until July 15, 2002, when Tommy Thompson, Health and Human Services Secretary placed John Howard in the post. The gap between Rosenstock and Howard was the longest between directors in the agency's 31-year history. The appointment was immediately praised by several organizations including the American Industrial Hygiene Association and AFL-CIO.

Under Howard, NIOSH shifted its research efforts to focus on emerging technologies. Howard sought practical applications for the new research. This included an initiative called "research-to-practice" (r2p) to ensure that NIOSH's findings would turn into practices and products that would ultimately benefit workers. He directed research on mining, nanotechnology, job stress, and ergonomics. Howard summarized the adjustments the Institute needed to make:

[NIOSH's] challenges used to be those that normally would have had a very widespread risk factor associated with them - chemical agents and physical agents like asbestos and radiation. A lot of the studies and interventions to eliminate those hazards have been done over the last 20 to 25 years. We're now dealing with issues that have personal risks, and it is more difficult to design strategies for causation and intervention studies to eliminate those risks, such as musculoskeletal injuries and work-related stress.

Howard expanded the National Occupational Research Agenda (NORA) instituted by his predecessor, Dr. Rosenstock, using it as a vehicle to work toward the institute's updated aims.

John Howard was appointed by President George W. Bush to be a special coordinator to handle the medical issues afflicting 9/11 rescue workers, specifically those at the World Trade Center site. Howard introduced the World Trade Center (WTC) Medical Monitoring and Treatment Program, which offered medical help and screening to emergency workers. With the 2011 enactment of the James Zadroga 9/11 Health and Compensation Act, Howard became Administrator of the World Trade Center Health Program.

As a public health administrator, Howard was admired for his ability to collaborate effectively, even with adversarial parties. He was noted for the tone of "openness and cooperation" he set and for listening to and seeking input from all available stakeholders.

As Howard's 6-year term approached its close, Centers for Disease Control and Prevention (CDC) director Julie Gerberding met with him to inform him that he would not be reappointed. His term ended on July 14, 2008, in a "controversial decision that brought criticism from safety and health stakeholders". He completed his term and began serving as a temporary legal advisor to the CDC director. NIOSH associate director Christine Branche, Ph.D., served as acting director in Dr. Howard's place.

On September 3, 2009, HHS Secretary Kathleen Sebelius announced Howard's reappointment as director of NIOSH and World Trade Center Programs coordinator for HHS. In 2016, Howard became the first person to be appointed to a third 6-year term as NIOSH director and received a fourth 6-year appointment in 2021.
