= National Occupational Research Agenda =

The National Occupational Research Agenda (NORA) is a partnership program developed by the National Institute for Occupational Safety and Health (NIOSH). The program was founded in 1996 to provide a framework for research collaborations among universities, large and small businesses, professional societies, government agencies, and worker organizations. Together these parties identify issues in the field of workplace safety and health that require immediate attention based on the number of workers affected, the seriousness of the hazard, and the likelihood that new safety information and approaches can effect a change.

== Developing the first research agenda ==
Dr. Linda Rosenstock, appointed director of NIOSH in 1994, saw the Institute as an agency that yielded strong scientific research but needed stronger connections to the real-world workforce. To remedy this, Rosenstock sought to develop stronger relationships with other organizations and agencies. NIOSH moved its headquarters from Atlanta to Washington, D.C., where the Institute could enjoy closer contact with labor and industry representatives. NIOSH's effort to build partnerships inside and outside of the government culminated in the development of the National Occupational Research Agenda.

To form the agenda, NIOSH leaders petitioned stakeholders in industry, labor, and health care for input. Organizations including General Motors, IBM, Mobil, the United Auto Workers, and the American Public Health Association joined NIOSH in developing the agenda. NIOSH sought additional aid through a series of public town meetings held in Chicago, Seattle, and Boston. In total, nearly 500 organizations and individuals provided the input that resulted in the research agenda.

== NORA in practice ==
NIOSH announced NORA's 21 priority research areas in 1996. On the strength of industry support and bipartisan backing, Congress increased funding for NIOSH and investment in NORA grew from $15.4 million in 1996 to $72.3 million in 1999. Following Rosenstock's resignation in 2000, Dr. John Howard continued to press and expand the NORA approach as NIOSH's new director. Periodically, the structure of the program is evaluated and updated as needed. Since 1996, NORA's projects have covered topics such as slip, trip, and fall (STF) injuries; green tobacco sickness; extended work hours; latex allergies; vehicle and mobile equipment-related injury; silica, lung cancer, and respiratory disease; and biomechanical stress in drywall installation.

== NORA's Research Organization: Sectors and Cross-Sectors ==
Since 2006, the program has been organized by industrial sector as defined in the North American Industry Classification System. NORA sector councils help to implement the national research agenda. The accomplishments of the second decade of NORA are described in a report published in 2017. NORA councils consists of participants from various backgrounds, affiliations and expertise, including stakeholders from universities, large and small businesses, professional associations, government agencies, and worker organizations. Councils present the opportunity to maximize resources towards improved occupational safety and health nationwide. They help build close partnerships among members and broader collaborations between councils and other organizations. The resulting information sharing and leveraging efforts helps promote widespread adoption of improved workplace practices based on research results. The NORA industry sector councils for the 2016–2026 decade are as follows:

- Agriculture, forestry, and fishing
- Construction
- Healthcare and social assistance
- Manufacturing
- Mining
- Oil and gas extraction
- Public safety
- Services
- Transportation, warehousing and utilities
- Wholesale and retail trade

In addition, NIOSH identified seven cross-sectors which focus on the health and safety issues affecting workers. The current NORA health outcome cross-sectors include:

- Cancer, Reproductive, Cardiovascular, and other Chronic Disease Prevention
- Hearing Loss Prevention
- Immune, Infectious, and Dermal Disease Prevention
- Musculoskeletal Health
- Respiratory Health
- Traumatic Injury Prevention
- Healthy Work Design and Well-Being

=== NORA priorities ===
The following types of information help inform NORA's priority setting process:

- number of workers at risk for illness or injury
- severity of the hazard/issue
- probability that new information will help abate the hazard

== NORA results ==
Every ten years, NIOSH reviews the activities, outcomes, and impacts of work completed over the past NORA decade and completes a report of those accomplishments. The first decade report evaluated contributions from 1996-2006, while the second decade report reviewed activities from 2006-2016. NORA's third decade covers the period from 2016–2026.

== NORA symposia ==
To ensure a continued focus on the practical application of the research, NIOSH cosponsored NORA Symposia in 1999, 2003, 2006, and 2008. The 2008 NORA Symposium—"Public Market for Ideas and Partnerships"—was the first not held in the Washington, D.C., area. Instead it was hosted in Denver, reflecting NIOSH's desire to expand occupational research collaborations in the Western United States.
