= National Institute for Occupational Safety and Health =

US federal government agency

Agency overview
- Formed: April 28, 1971; 55 years ago
- Preceding agency: Division of Industrial Hygiene
- Jurisdiction: Federal government of the United States
- Headquarters: Washington, D.C.
- Employees: ~1,200
- Agency executive: John Howard, Director
- Parent department: Department of Health and Human Services
- Parent agency: Centers for Disease Control and Prevention
- Website: cdc.gov/niosh/

The National Institute for Occupational Safety and Health (NIOSH, /ˈnaɪɒʃ/) is the United States federal agency responsible for conducting research and making recommendations for the prevention of work-related injury, illness, disability, and death. Its functions include gathering information, conducting scientific research both in the laboratory and in the field, and translating the knowledge gained into products and services. Among NIOSH's programs are determination of recommended exposure limits for toxic chemicals and other hazards, field research such as the Health Hazard Evaluation Program, epidemiology and health surveillance programs such as the National Firefighter Registry for Cancer, regulatory approval of respirators according to the NIOSH air filtration rating system, and compensation and support programs such as the World Trade Center Health Program.

The Occupational Safety and Health Act, signed by President Richard M. Nixon on December 29, 1970, created NIOSH out of the preexisting Division of Industrial Hygiene founded in 1914. NIOSH is part of the Centers for Disease Control and Prevention within the Department of Health and Human Services (HHS). Despite the similarities in names, it is not part of the National Institutes of Health or OSHA, which have distinct and separate responsibilities.

NIOSH is headquartered in Washington, D.C., with research laboratories and offices in Cincinnati, Morgantown, Pittsburgh, Denver, Anchorage, Spokane, and Atlanta. NIOSH is a professionally diverse organization with a staff of 1,200 people representing a wide range of disciplines including occupational epidemiology, occupational toxicology, medicine, industrial hygiene, safety, research psychology, engineering, chemistry, and statistics.

As part of the announced 2025 HHS reorganization plans, on April 1, 93% of NIOSH's staff was told they were being fired. This most strongly impacted its mining safety research and respirator approval programs, with its laboratory in Spokane, Washington, and the National Personal Protective Technology Laboratory in Pittsburgh expected to close completely, as well as the National Firefighter Registry for Cancer. Operations at the Morgantown, West Virginia, campus also ceased on April 1 as staff were placed on leave and instructed to leave the building, ending its research into emerging threats to workers. The cuts included all staff of the Coal Workers' Health Surveillance Program which offered free health care for coal workers, including a mobile x-ray van that screened workers for signs of black lung disease.

== Authority ==
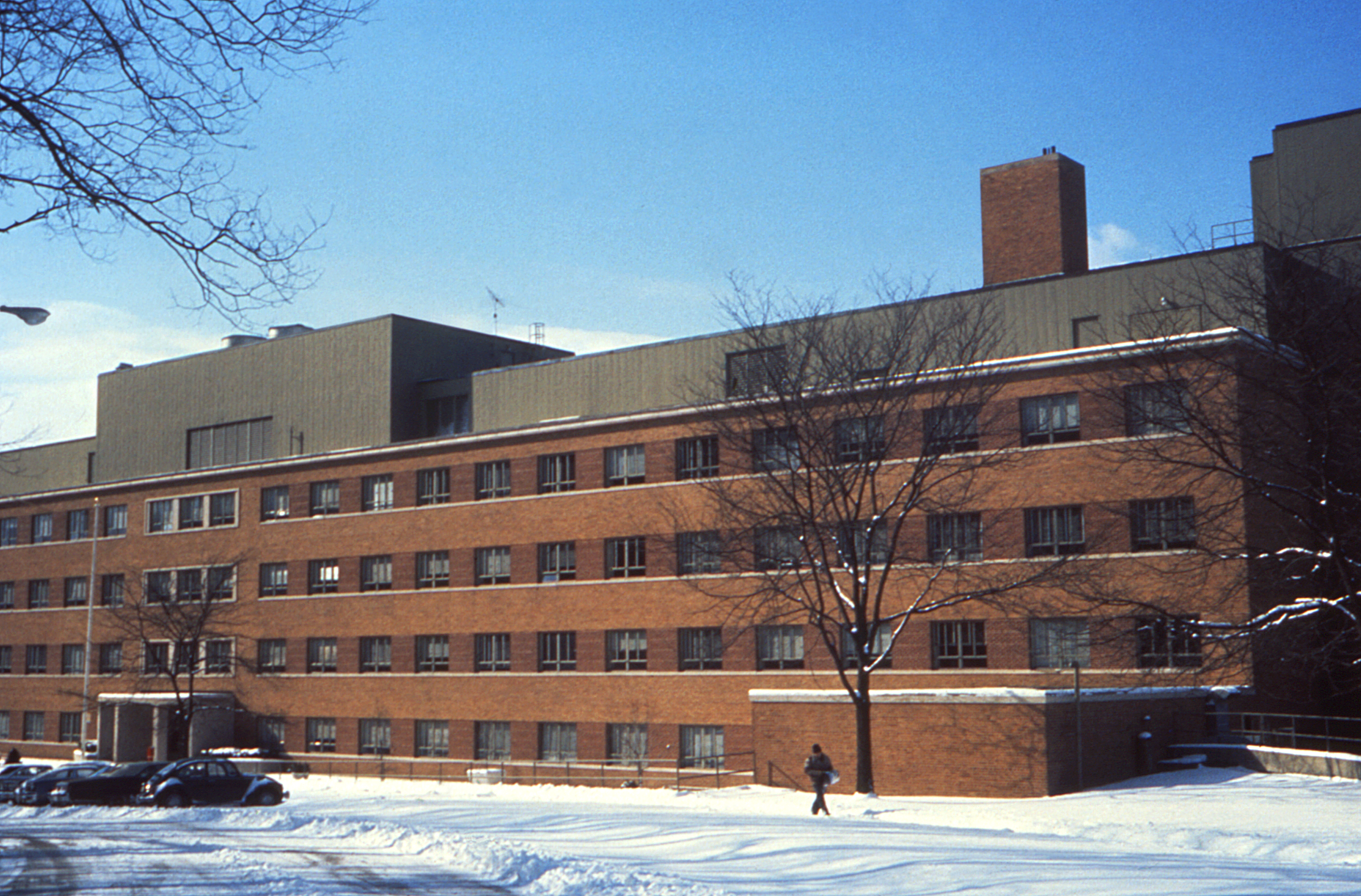
NIOSH's Taft Laboratory in Cincinnati in 1976

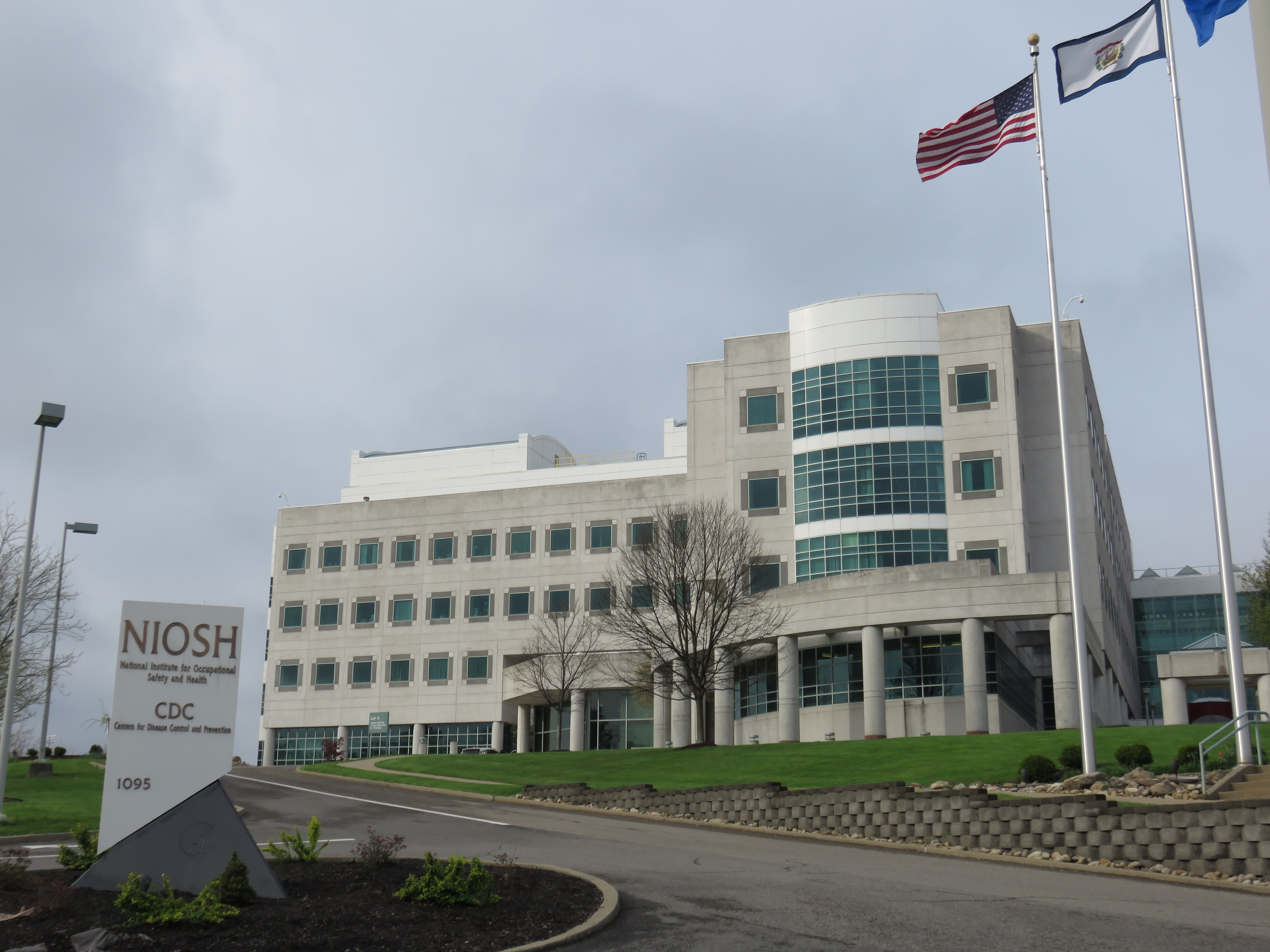
NIOSH's Byrd Laboratory in Morgantown, West Virginia in 2017

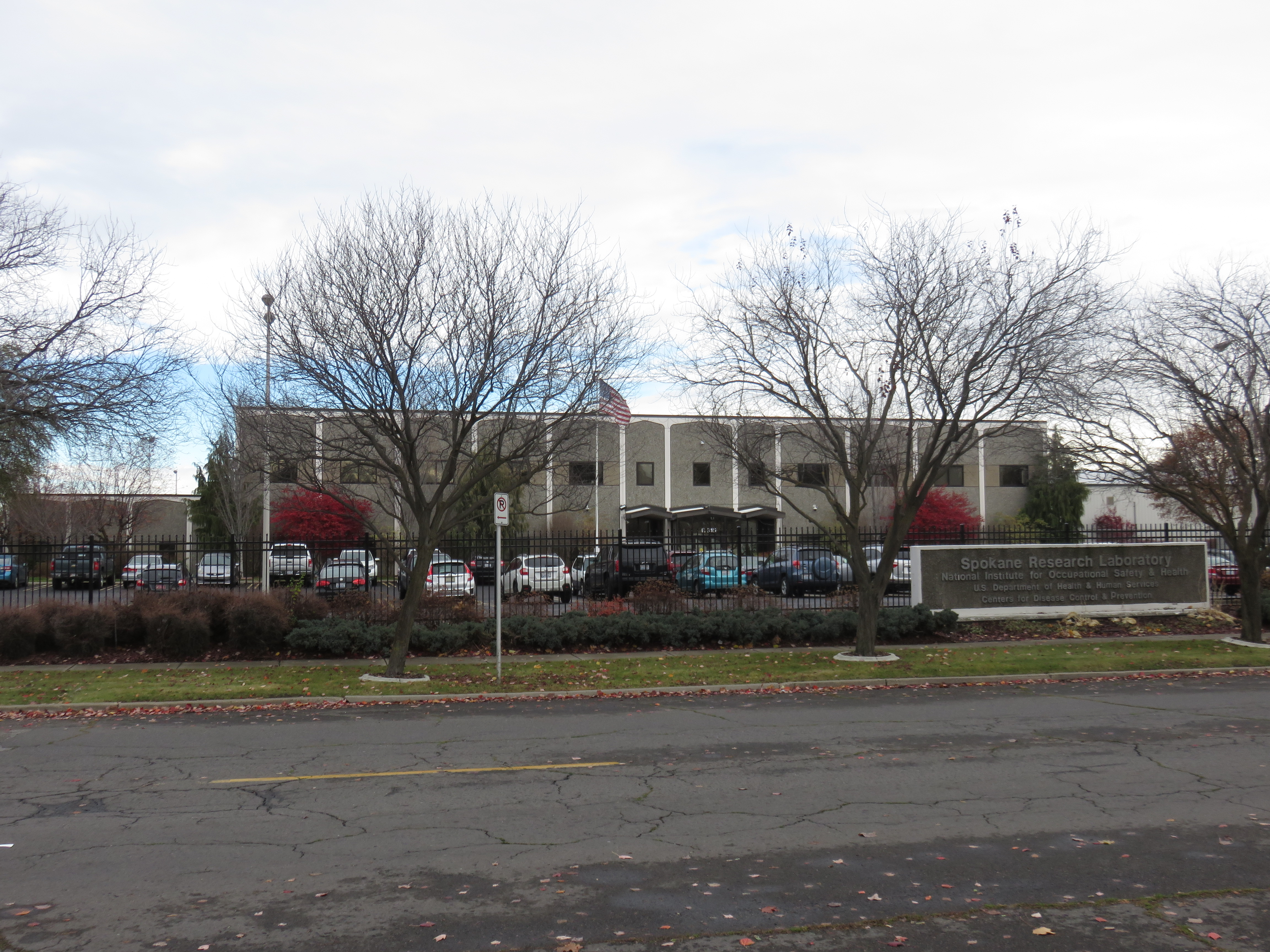
NIOSH's laboratory in Spokane, Washington in 2018

Unlike its counterpart, the Occupational Safety and Health Administration, NIOSH's authority under the Occupational Safety and Health Act (29 U.S.C. § 671) is to "develop recommendations for health and safety standards", to "develop information on safe levels of exposure to toxic materials and harmful physical agents and substances", and to "conduct research on new safety and health problems". NIOSH may also "conduct on-site investigations (Health Hazard Evaluations) to determine the toxicity of materials used in workplaces" and "fund research by other agencies or private organizations through grants, contracts, and other arrangements".

Also, pursuant to its authority granted to it by the Mine Safety and Health Act of 1977, NIOSH may "develop recommendations for mine health standards for the Mine Safety and Health Administration", "administer a medical surveillance program for miners, including chest X‑rays to detect pneumoconiosis (black lung disease) in coal miners", "conduct on-site investigations in mines similar to those authorized for general industry under the Occupational Safety and Health Act; and "test and certify personal protective equipment and hazard-measurement instruments".

Under 42 CFR 84, NIOSH has the right to issue and revoke certifications for respirators, such as the N95. Currently, NIOSH is the only body authorized to regulate respirators, and has trademark rights to the NIOSH air filtration ratings.

== Programs ==
=== Major guidance publications ===
NIOSH determines recommended exposure limits and immediately dangerous to life or health levels for toxic chemicals and other hazards, which are published in various types of publications.

Criteria Documents contain recommendations for the prevention of occupational diseases and injuries. These documents are submitted to the Occupational Safety and Health Administration or the Mine Safety and Health Administration for consideration in their formulation of legally binding safety and health standards.

Current Intelligence Bulletins analyze new information about occupational health and safety hazards.

The NIOSH Manual of Analytical Methods contains recommended standard methods for collection, sampling and analysis of contaminants in the workplace and industrial hygiene samples, including air filters, biological fluids, wipes and bulks for occupationally relevant analytes.

The NIOSH Pocket Guide to Chemical Hazards informs workers, employers, and occupational health professionals about workplace chemicals and their hazards.

=== Field studies ===
NIOSH Fatality Assessment and Control Evaluation report on electrical hazards

NIOSH conducts field research through a number of programs:

- The Health Hazard Evaluation Program allows employees, employers, and labor unions can request assistance from the HHE program at no cost to them.
- The Fatality Assessment and Control Evaluation program publishes occupational fatality data that are used to publish fatality reports by specific sectors of industry and types of fatal incidents.
- The Fire Fighter Fatality Investigation and Prevention Program investigates specifically the causes of firefighter deaths on the job.

=== National Personal Protective Technology Laboratory ===
The National Personal Protective Technology Laboratory (NPPTL) is a research center within NIOSH located in Pittsburgh, Pennsylvania, devoted to research on personal protective equipment (PPE). NPPTL was created in 2001 at the request of the U.S. Congress, in response to a recognized need for improved research in PPE technologies. It focuses on experimentation and recommendations for respirator masks, by ensuring a level of standard filter efficiency, and develops criteria for testing and developing PPE.

The laboratory conducts research and provides recommendations for other types of PPE, including protective clothing, gloves, eye protection, headwear, hearing protection, chemical sensors, and communication devices for safe deployment of emergency workers. It also maintains certification for N95 respirators, and hosts an annual education day for N95 education. Its emergency response research is part of a collaboration with the National Fire Protection Association.

In the 2010s, the NPPTL has focused on pandemic influenza preparedness, CBRNE incidents, miner PPE, and nanotechnology.

==== NIOSH Certified Equipment List ====
NPPTL is the designated publisher of the NIOSH Certified Equipment List, or CEL. The CEL is a public domain database that details the respirators currently approved by NIOSH, and is ordered separated based on type of respirator, which is designated with a schedule (e.g. TC-84A). The CEL was initially released in paper form on September 30, 1993. However, due to low usage of the paper CEL, as well as the increasing number of respirators approved by NIOSH, a Microsoft Access-based version of the CEL was released. Initial releases of the CEL had hose and pressure information for air-line respirators. This information had been eliminated due to concerns over users prioritizing the CEL over respirator documentation.

=== Mining safety research ===
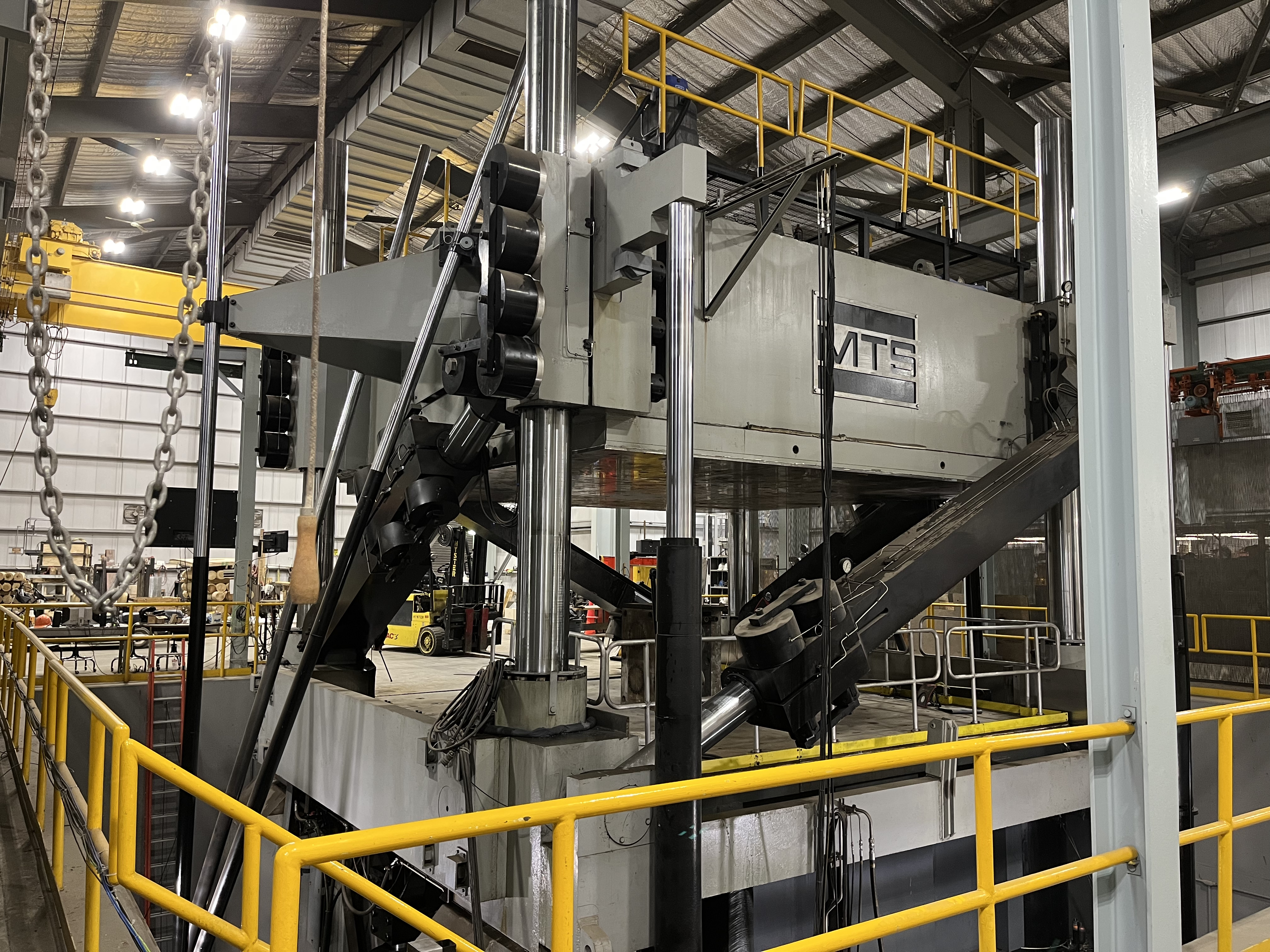
Both NIOSH's Experimental Mine and Mine Roof Simulator (pictured) in Bruceton, Pennsylvania, are listed on the National Register of Historic Places

NIOSH's two mining safety research divisions are devoted towards the elimination of mining fatalities, injuries, and illnesses through research and prevention. Mining research done by NIOSH is primarily focused in two locations: Pittsburgh, Pennsylvania and Spokane, Washington. The Pittsburgh site focuses on a larger scope of mine safety and health issues, including dust monitoring and control, mine ventilation, hearing loss prevention and engineering noise controls, diesel particulate monitoring and control, emergency response and rescue, firefighting and prevention, training research, ergonomics and machine safety, mine ground control, electrical safety, explosives safety, surveillance, and technology transfer. The Spokane site primarily focuses on metal and nonmetal mining.

This was originally conducted by the U.S. Bureau of Mines, which was founded in 1910. Following the dissolution of the U.S. Bureau of Mines in 1995–1996, its Safety and Health Program was transferred to the Department of Energy on an interim basis. In 1997, it was permanently transferred to NIOSH as the Office of Mine Safety and Health Research. In 2015, it was administratively divided into two divisions by location, the Pittsburgh Mining Research Division and the Spokane Mining Research Division.

=== Compensation and support ===
NIOSH administers the World Trade Center Health Program, which provides medical benefits to specific groups of individuals who were affected by the September 11 attacks in 2001 against the United States. The WTC Health Program was established by Title I of the James Zadroga 9/11 Health and Compensation Act in 2011.

Separately, for some claims for cancers that may have been caused by occupational radiation exposure filed under the Energy Employees Occupational Illness Compensation Program, NIOSH's Division of Compensation Analysis and Support performs a radiation dose reconstruction. NIOSH requests the energy employee's individual exposure records, and interviews the claimant or survivors, and collects all relevant data regarding the individual's work site.

=== B Reader Program ===
NIOSH certifies physicians, known as B readers, qualified to read radiographic images of various occupational diseases, such as diseases caused by silica, asbestos, and coal dust. A list of B Readers can be found on the NIOSH website for the program. B Reader testimony has been used extensively in mesothelioma personal injury lawsuits.

=== Epidemiology and health surveillance ===
NIOSH has several programs in occupational epidemiology and workplace health surveillance, including:

- Adult Blood Lead Epidemiology and Surveillance
- National Firefighter Registry for Cancer
- SENSOR-Pesticides

=== Hearing protection ===
- Buy Quiet and Safe-in-Sound Award
- The NIOSH Power Tools Database contains sound power levels, sound pressure levels, and vibrations data for a variety of common power tools that have been tested by NIOSH researchers.
- The NIOSH Hearing Protection Device Compendium contains attenuation information and features for commercially available earplugs, earmuffs and semi-aural insert devices (canal caps).

=== Extramural programs ===
==== Education and Research Centers ====
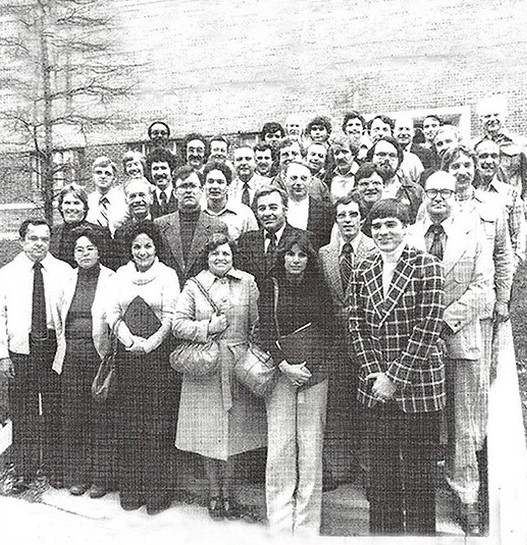
Staff members at the NIOSH research center in Cincinnati, Ohio, in 1978

NIOSH Education and Research Centers are multidisciplinary centers supported by the National Institute for Occupational Safety and Health for education and research in the field of occupational health. Through the centers, NIOSH supports academic degree programs and research opportunities, as well as continuing education for OSH professionals. The ERCs, distributed in regions across the United States, establish academic, labor, and industry research partnerships. The research conducted at the centers is related to the National Occupational Research Agenda (NORA) established by NIOSH.

Founded in 1977, NIOSH ERCs are responsible for nearly half of post-baccalaureate graduates entering occupational health and safety fields. The ERCs focus on industrial hygiene, occupational health nursing, occupational medicine, occupational safety, and other areas of specialization. At many ERCs, students in specific disciplines have their tuition paid in full and receive additional stipend money. ERCs provide a benefit to local businesses by offering reduced price assessments to local businesses.

==== Centers for Agricultural Safety and Health ====
The Centers for Agricultural Safety and Health (CASH) are a set of 12 NIOSH-funded agencies focused on occupational health in industry involving food or plant products, such as fishing, forestry, and agriculture. The agencies were established in 1990 under the Agricultural Health and Safety Initiative.

The National Agricultural Safety Database, which contains citations and summaries of scholarly journal articles and reports about agricultural health and safety, was developed through the CASH program.

== Locations and organization ==
NIOSH has 12 divisions, distributed among eight locations across the United States.

=== Cincinnati ===
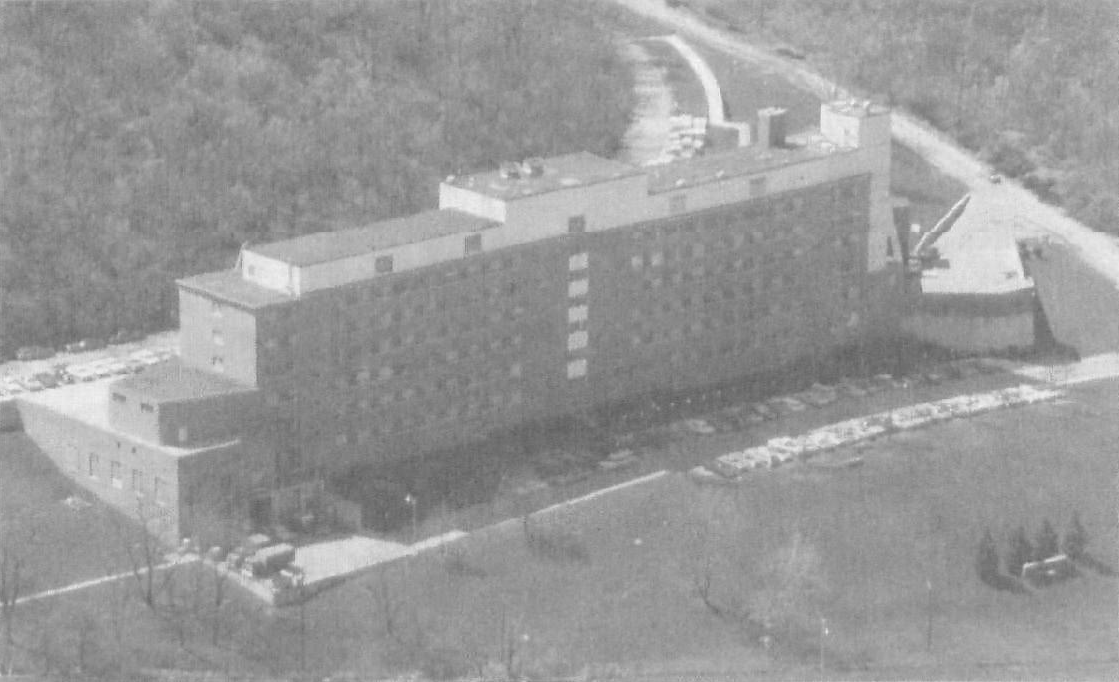
NIOSH occupied the Robert A. Taft Center as its main facility in 1976. The building had opened in 1954 for the PHS Environmental Health Divisions, which became the Environmental Protection Agency in 1970 and moved to a new facility.

NIOSH's largest location is Cincinnati, which has two facilities. The first is the Robert A. Taft Laboratory in the Columbia-Tusculum neighborhood, which hosts the Division of Compensation Analysis and Support and Division of Science Integration. It was named for the then-recently deceased Senator Robert A. Taft, opened in 1954, and was initially used by for the PHS Environmental Health Divisions and their successor the Environmental Protection Agency (EPA).

The second Cincinnati facility is the Alice Hamilton Laboratory at 5555 Ridge Avenue in the Pleasant Ridge neighborhood, which hosts the Division of Field Studies and Engineering. 5555 Ridge Avenue was constructed during 1952–1954 and was initially the headquarters and manufacturing plant of Disabled American Veterans; PHS leased space in it beginning in 1962, and by 1973 the entire building was leased by the federal government.

NIOSH occupied both buildings in 1976, after EPA moved to the new Andrew W. Breidenbach Environmental Research Center. In 1982, 5555 Ridge Avenue was purchased outright by PHS, and in 1987 it was renamed the Alice Hamilton Laboratory for Occupational Safety and Health, after occupational health pioneer Alice Hamilton.

=== Other locations ===
NIOSH's headquarters are in Washington, D.C., with a branch in Atlanta. The Office of the Director and the World Trade Center Health Program are centered at these locations. NIOSH and its direct predecessor has had a presence in the Washington, D.C. area going back to 1918. NIOSH's presence in Atlanta began when the headquarters moved there in 1981, and offices were retained there when the headquarters returned to the Washington area in 1994.

The Morgantown, West Virginia location hosts the Division of Safety Research, Health Effects Laboratory Division, and Respiratory Health Division. It dates from the Appalachian Laboratory for Occupational Respiratory Diseases created in 1967, and the building opened in 1971. In 1996, a second building adjoining the first opened.

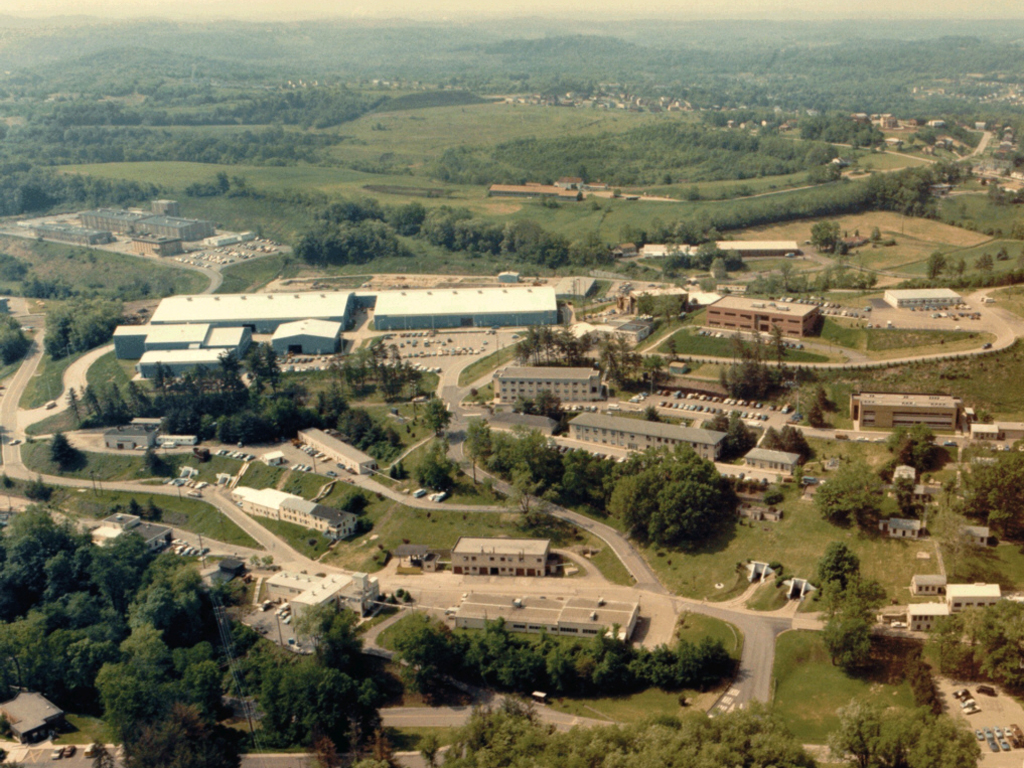
NIOSH absorbed the Bureau of Mines' research activities in 1996, along with its facilities in the Pittsburgh area dating from 1910.

The facilities in the Pittsburgh suburb of Bruceton, Pennsylvania host the Pittsburgh Mining Research Division and National Personal Protective Technology Laboratory, and the Spokane, Washington location hosts the Spokane Mining Research Division and Western States Division. The locations were inherited from the U.S. Bureau of Mines after it was closed in 1996 and its research activities were transferred to NIOSH. The Pittsburgh campus dated from the beginning of the Bureau of Mines in 1910, and contained the historic Experimental Mine and Mine Roof Simulator. The Spokane facility dates from 1951.

The Western States Division also has branch locations in Denver and Anchorage, Alaska. The Denver location was established in the 1970s as a regional office, and the Alaska location was established in 1991.

== History ==
=== Predecessor ===
NIOSH's earliest predecessor was the U.S. Public Health Service Office of Industrial Hygiene and Sanitation, established in 1914. It went through several name changes, most notably becoming the Division of Industrial Hygiene and later the Division of Occupational Health. Its headquarters were established in Washington, D.C. in 1918, and field stations in Salt Lake City in 1949, and in Cincinnati in 1950.

=== Establishment ===
NIOSH was created by the Occupational Safety and Health Act of 1970 and began operating in May 1971. It was originally part of the Health Services and Mental Health Administration, and was transferred into what was then called the Center for Disease Control (CDC) in 1973. NIOSH's initial headquarters were located in Rockville, Maryland.

Prior to 1976, NIOSH's Cincinnati operations occupied space at three locations in Downtown Cincinnati, and rented space at 5555 Ridge Avenue in the Pleasant Ridge neighborhood. In 1976, staff at the Downtown locations were relocated to the Robert A. Taft Center in the Columbia-Tusculum neighborhood, which the Environmental Protection Agency was vacating to occupy the new Andrew W. Breidenbach Environmental Research Center elsewhere in Cincinnati.

The Appalachian Laboratory for Occupational Respiratory Diseases, which had been created within the PHS in 1967 to focus on black lung disease research, was incorporated into NIOSH, and its building in Morgantown, West Virginia was opened in 1971. As of 1976, NIOSH also continued to operate its Salt Lake City facility.

=== Later history ===
In 1981, the headquarters was moved from Rockville to Atlanta to co-locate with CDC headquarters. The headquarters moved back to Washington, D.C. in 1994, though offices were maintained in Atlanta.

When the U.S. Bureau of Mines was closed in 1996, its research activities were transferred to NIOSH along with two facilities in the Pittsburgh suburbs and in Spokane, Washington. NIOSH preserved the administrative independence of these activities by placing them in the new Office of Mine Safety and Health Research.

In 1977, NIOSH had ten regional offices throughout the country. These were closed over time, and by 1989 there were regional offices only in Denver and Boston. The Alaska Field Station in Anchorage, Alaska was established in 1991 in response to the state having the highest work-related fatality rate, with Senator Ted Stevens playing a role in its establishment. It later become known as the Alaska Pacific Regional Office, and in 2015, the Denver, Anchorage, and non-mining Spokane staff joined into the Western States Division.

In 1996, a large addition was built to the Morgantown facility containing safety engineering and bench laboratories. In 2015, funding was approved for a new facility in Cincinnati to replace the Taft and Hamilton buildings, which were considered to be obsolete. A location for the new facility in the Avondale neighborhood was announced in 2017, and proposals from architectural and engineering firms were solicited in 2019.

In 2001, NIOSH was called upon to help clean up Capitol Hill buildings after the 2001 anthrax attacks.

In 2025, most NIOSH staff were fired and most of its departments were closed following orders by HHS secretary Robert F. Kennedy Jr.

== Directors ==
The following people were Director of NIOSH:

No.	Image	Director	Term start	Term end	Refs.
1		Marcus Key	1971	1975	
2		John Finklea	1975	1978	
3		Anthony Robbins	1978	1981	
4		J. Donald Millar	1981	1993	
acting		Richard Lemen	1993	1994	
5		Linda Rosenstock	1994	October 31, 2000	
acting		Lawrence J. Fine	November 1, 2000	June 2001	
acting		Kathleen Rest	June 2001	July 14, 2002	
6a (Note: Howard has served as Director over three non-consecutive periods.)		John Howard	July 15, 2002	July 14, 2008	
acting		Christine Branche	July 15, 2008	September 2, 2009	
6b		John Howard	September 3, 2009	April 1, 2025	
acting		Kelley Durst	April 1, 2025	May 13, 2025	
6c		John Howard	May 13, 2025	present	

Table notes

== See also ==
- National Fire Fighter Near-Miss Reporting System
- Prevention through design
- Occupational exposure banding
- Division of Industrial Hygiene
- N95 respirator
