= Linda Rosenstock =

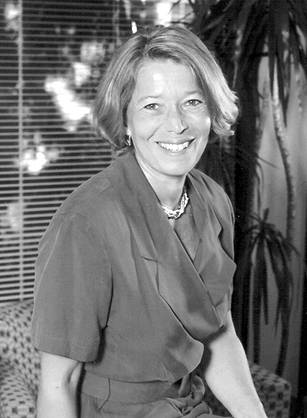

Director of the National Institute for Occupational Safety and Health
- In office 1994–2000
- Preceded by: J. Donald Millar
- Succeeded by: John Howard

Personal details
- Born: December 20, 1950 (age 75) New York City, NY
- Education: Brandeis University; Johns Hopkins University
- Profession: Public health administrator, medical educator

Linda Rosenstock is a public health specialist and administrator. She served as the director for the National Institute for Occupational Safety and Health from 1994 through 2000 and was dean of the University of California, Los Angeles School of Public Health from November 2000 to July 1, 2012.

== Early career ==
Linda Rosenstock was born in New York City in 1950. She studied psychology, receiving an A.B. from Brandeis University in Waltham, Massachusetts. In 1977 she received her M.D. from the Johns Hopkins School of Medicine and M.P.H. from the Johns Hopkins School of Public Health.

With both an M.D. and M.P.H., Rosenstock opted to emphasize public health over clinical health, expressing a desire reach as many people as possible. She articulated this decision later, saying "Who wouldn't want to improve health for thousands or millions at a time?"

Rosenstock began post-graduate training at the University of Washington, completing her residency in 1980. She continued on at the university as a chief resident in primary care internal medicine. She was a Robert Wood Johnson Clinical Scholar from 1980 to 1982. In 1993, Rosenstock attained the rank of full professor in the Department of Medicine at the University of Washington, and professor in the Department of Environmental Health in the School of Public Health and Community Medicine. Over this time, she published numerous articles and three books. From 1993 to 1994, Rosenstock chaired the United Auto Workers/General Motors Occupational Health Advisory Board.

== Director of National Institute for Occupational Safety and Health ==
In 1994 Dr. Rosenstock was named director of the National Institute for Occupational Safety and Health (NIOSH) in Washington, D.C. She led a staff of 1,500 at the only federal agency with a mandate to undertake research and prevention activities in occupational safety and health. However, after only six months in the position, Rosenstock was threatened with the dissolution of the Institute. The 104th Congress attempted to dismantle NIOSH in 1995, though it was ultimately unsuccessful. Following this threat, NIOSH's responsibilities, staff, and budget grew.

=== NORA ===
As director of NIOSH, Rosenstock was instrumental in creating the National Occupational Research Agenda, a framework for guiding occupational safety and health research. She led this effort, which involved hundreds of external partners, to identify pressing workplace health risks and to collaborate among the partners to address them. During Rosenstock's tenure, NIOSH acquired the health and safety functions of the former Bureau of Mines and its staff of 400 in the Pittsburgh and Spokane research centers. Rosenstock emphasized practical recommendations, including new NIOSH respirator testing and certification requirements and the use of engineering controls in industry.

=== Awards ===
For her work at NIOSH, Rosenstock received the Presidential Distinguished Executive Rank Award, the government's highest executive service award. Additionally, the Institute's successes were honored by Vice President Gore with a Hammer Award for excellence in reinventing government. Rosenstock was awarded the Alice Hamilton Award by the American Industrial Hygiene Association in 1999.

== Dean of UCLA School of Public Health ==
In 2000, Rosenstock accepted the position of dean of the School of Public Health at the University of California, Los Angeles. In a press release, she stated "While I am excited about this new opportunity, it is difficult to leave NIOSH and all that we have accomplished over the last six years. I sincerely believe that working people are better off because of NIOSH's research and prevention activities. I am confident that the hard work and dedication to the field of occupational safety and health will continue long after I have left the Institute."

As dean, Rosenstock oversees 700 graduate students and more than 180 faculty members. She holds appointments as Professor of Medicine and Environmental Health Sciences.

== Other work ==
Rosenstock has been active internationally in teaching and research in occupational health and has served as an advisor to the World Health Organization. This included health effects studies in Latin America. She is an Honorary Fellow of the Royal College of Physicians and a member of the Society of Medical Administrators and the National Academy of Sciences' Institute of Medicine. As a member of the National Academy of Sciences' Institute of Medicine (IOM), Rosenstock sits on the Board on Health Sciences Policy, and in 2003 she co-chaired the IOM committee addressing public health workforce needs.
