= Health Hazard Evaluation Program =

A video about measuring contaminants in the air at a workplace as part of an HHE investigation

The Health Hazard Evaluation (HHE) program is a workplace health program administered by the National Institute for Occupational Safety and Health (NIOSH) by which employees, employers, and labor unions can request assistance from the HHE program at no cost to them.

The HHE program responds to requests through a variety of methods, including telephone consultations and field investigations. NIOSH provides a report detailing the hazards found and providing recommendations to address hazards and improve workplace health and safety. NIOSH is not an enforcement agency for workplace standards, so recommended changes do not have to be made. However, NIOSH experience has shown that many employers address problems identified in their reports to improve the health and safety of their workforce. The report is given to the requestor, the employer, employee representatives, OSHA, and other appropriate agencies; most reports are posted on the NIOSH website. Reports released after November 2010 do not have the company name listed in the final report.

NIOSH developed the HHE program to comply with a mandate in the Occupational Safety and Health Act of 1970 to investigate workplace health hazards reported by employers and employees. According to Section 20(a)(6) of the Act, the Secretary of Health and Human Services is authorized "following a written request by any employer or authorized representative of employees, to determine whether any substance normally found in the place of employment has potentially toxic effects in such concentrations as used or found."

== Requests ==
NIOSH recommends requesting an HHE if employees are sick and the cause is unknown or the number of illnesses or injuries is higher than expected in a group of employees. Requests should also be made when employees are exposed to a new hazard or a hazard unregulated by OSHA or when employees are experiencing ill health when their exposure to an agent is below the occupational exposure limits. If multiple hazardous agents or conditions are present in the workplace, an HHE request can be beneficial. Common hazards evaluated include mold, chemicals, particulates, noise, radiation, biological agents, ergonomics, heat stress, and occupational stress.

An HHE can be requested by current employee(s) of the workplace, a management official on behalf of the employer, or a labor union representing employees at the workplace. For workplaces with more than three employees, an employee request must be supported by the signatures of three employees. If the workplace has three or fewer employees, only one employee signature is required.

The Occupational Safety and Health Act gives NIOSH the authority to conduct HHEs in the private sector and federal workplaces. When the workplace is part of a state or local government, NIOSH authority is more limited and the employer's cooperation may be necessary before NIOSH can do an evaluation.

== HHE process ==
A video about measuring contaminants on workers' skin and workplace surfaces as part of an HHE investigation

A video about medical testing at a workplace as part of an HHE investigation

NIOSH typically initially contacts the requestor within 30 days to discuss the request. How the request is addressed largely depends on the nature of the request. In most cases, NIOSH responds with a telephone consultation to discuss the problems and how to correct them. For other requests, NIOSH visits the workplace to learn more about the health hazards present. In a small number of cases, NIOSH refers the request to a more appropriate agency.

On-site workplace evaluations are coordinated with the employer; NIOSH rarely makes unannounced visits. At the conclusion of an initial site visit, NIOSH reports its preliminary findings and recommendations verbally to the employer, employees, and employee representatives (such as labor unions). In addition, NIOSH provides a letter summarizing the preliminary findings and recommendations. This is typically sent within 10 days of the end of the site visit. At this point in the evaluation, the results are mostly incomplete, and in some cases, more visits are necessary. Employees who participate in exposure or health testing will receive their personal tests results if they choose so. Employers are provided summary information on exposure or health testing results without identifying individual employees' results. After results are completely analyzed, NIOSH compiles a final report. The report contains the official findings of the evaluation and recommendations on how to address health hazards found or to improve programs for protecting employee health. This report is sent to the employer, the employee representative, OSHA, and other agencies. The employer must post this report in the workplace where all employees can view it for a minimum of 30 days.

== Employee protection ==
Federal laws and regulations provide some protection against possible discriminatory actions in the workplace for employees who request an HHE or participate in an evaluation. If an employee requests it, NIOSH will not disclose their name to the employer. Additionally, the Occupational Safety and Health Act and the Federal Mine Safety and Health Act prohibit employers from punishing employees for reporting a health hazard or participating in NIOSH investigations.

== Completed reports ==
NIOSH has completed over 3,000 HHE reports detailing on-site workplace evaluations in all 50 states and some US territories, including Puerto Rico and the US Virgin Islands. The reports are available from the NIOSH website or by contacting the HHE program. HHE reports can be searched online.

== HHE program impact ==
The HHE Program conducts “followback activities” to learn if evaluated workplaces found the HHE useful, whether employers implemented recommendations, and to determine if workplaces need additional help. Followback activities can include surveys, conference calls, and return visits. Followback data shows the majority of respondents have implemented the HHE program’s recommendations, think the evaluation improved the health and safety of the workplace, and would request an HHE again.

== Comparison to OSHA inspections and the OSHA consultation program ==
Although OSHA inspectors and HHE program staff have legal authority to enter workplaces, there are important differences between the programs. OSHA is a regulatory agency. OSHA inspections focus on known and regulated hazards, and inspectors can issue citations and fines for noncompliance with safety and health regulations. NIOSH is a research agency. Its evaluations cover known or unrecognized hazards. The HHE program does not issue fines or citations.

The OSHA on-site consultation program shares some features with the HHE program. Both programs provide services at no cost to the requestors and assess occupational health and safety issues. Neither program issues citations, fines, or penalties. However, only small or mid-sized business owners can request an OSHA consultation, and owners are required to correct identified hazards. In contrast, employers, employees, and unions from any sized business can request an HHE, and employers are not required to follow HHE program recommendations.

== Emergency response activities ==
The HHE Program provides technical assistance during federal emergencies. Staff are trained to respond to a natural disasters and biological, chemical, explosive, and radiological events. The HHE Program provided protection to emergency response workers in the September 11 attacks, anthrax attacks, Hurricane Katrina, Deepwater Horizon oil spill, and the Ebola epidemic.

== See also ==
- Occupational hygiene
- Occupational medicine
- Occupational safety and health
