= Climate change in the United States =

Emissions, impacts and responses of the United States related to climate change

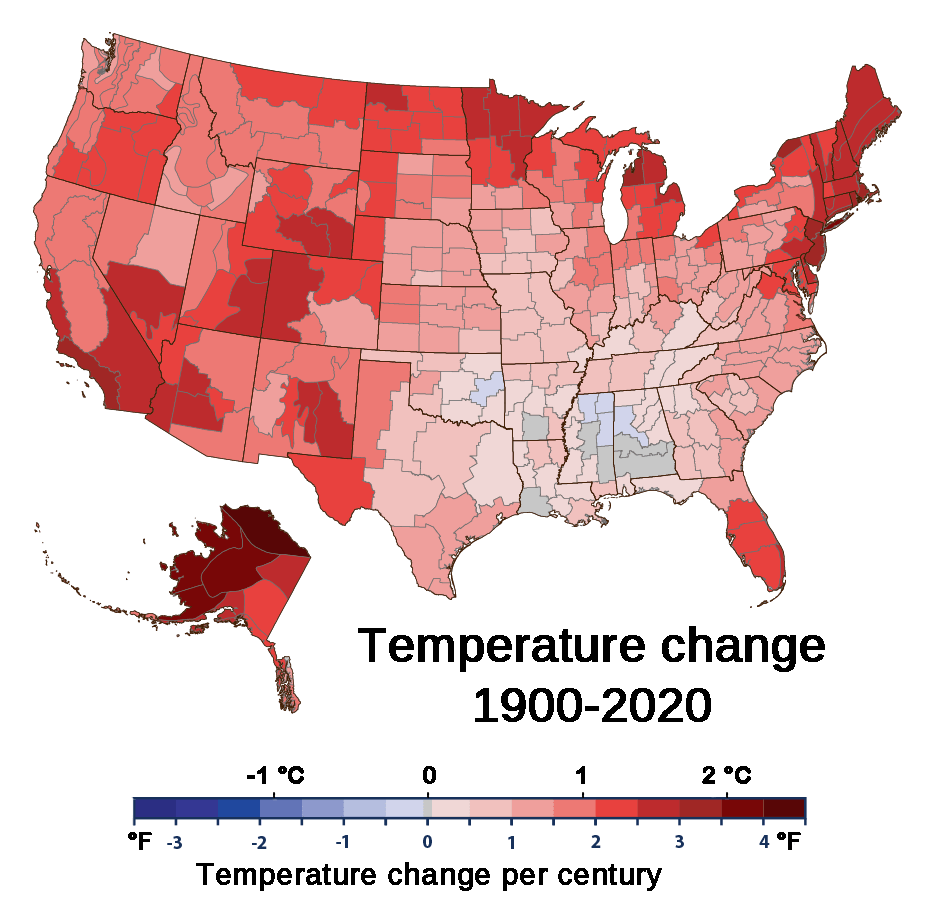
Average temperatures in almost all regions in the U.S. have increased in the last 120 years.

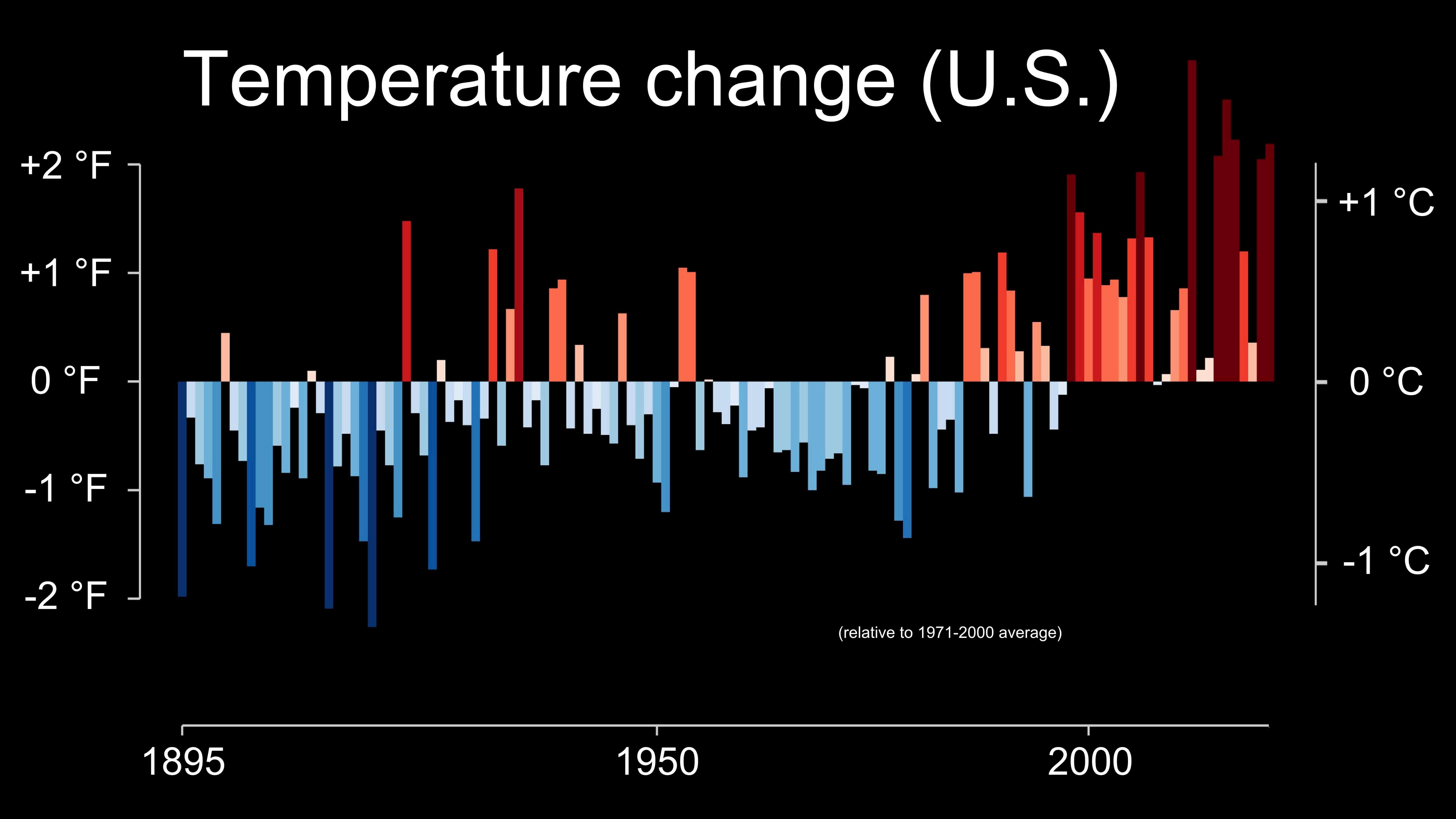
Annual temperatures averaged across the U.S. have exceeded the 1971–2000 average almost every year in the 21st century.

Climate change has led to the United States warming by 2.6 °F (1.4 °C) since 1970. In 2023, the global average near-surface temperature reached 1.45 °C above pre-industrial levels, making it the warmest year on record. The climate of the United States is shifting in ways that are widespread and varied between regions. From 2010 to 2019, the United States experienced its hottest decade on record. Extreme weather events, invasive species, floods and droughts are increasing. Climate change's impacts on tropical cyclones and sea level rise also affect regions of the country.

Cumulatively since 1850, the U.S. has emitted a larger share than any country of the greenhouse gases causing current climate change, with some 20% of the global total of carbon dioxide alone. Current US emissions per person are among the largest in the world. Various state and federal climate change policies have been introduced, and the US has ratified the Paris Agreement despite temporarily withdrawing. In 2021, the country set a target of halving its annual greenhouse gas emissions by 2030; however oil and gas companies still receive tax breaks.

Climate change is having considerable impacts on the environment and society of the United States. This includes implications for agriculture, the economy (especially the affordability and availability of insurance), human health, and indigenous peoples, and it is seen as a national security threat. US States that emit more carbon dioxide per person and introduce policies to oppose climate action are generally experiencing greater impacts. 2020 was a historic year for billion-dollar weather and climate disasters in U.S. In 2024, the United States experienced 27 separate weather and climate disasters, each causing over $1 billion in damages, in total, it caused $27 billion in damages. This set a record for the most billion dollars disasters in a single year.

Although historically a non-partisan issue, climate change has become controversial and politically divisive in the country in recent decades. Oil companies have known since the 1970s that burning oil and gas could cause global warming but nevertheless funded deniers for years. Despite the support of a clear scientific consensus, as recently as 2021 one-third of Americans deny that human-caused climate change exists although the majority are concerned or alarmed about the issue.

== Greenhouse gas emissions ==
The U.S. has higher annual per capita emissions than China, which has more total annual emissions.

Cumulatively over time, U.S. emissions have caused more economic damage globally than any other nation.

Though the U.S.'s per capita and per GDP emissions have declined significantly, the raw numerical decline in emissions is much less substantial.

Since 1850, the United States has cumulatively contributed the greatest amount of greenhouse gases of any nation or region.

The U.S. has been the predominant producer of natural gas, which includes the greenhouse gas methane.

Greenhouse gas emissions in the U.S., arranged by economic sector

The United States produced 7 billion metric tons of carbon dioxide equivalent greenhouse gas (GHG) emissions in 2025, the second largest in the world after greenhouse gas emissions by China and among the countries with the highest greenhouse gas emissions per person. In 2025 China is estimated to have emitted 29% of world GHG, followed by the United States with 12%, then India with 7%. In total the United States has emitted a quarter of world GHG, more than any other country. Annual emissions are over 15 tons per person and, amongst the top eight emitters, it is the highest country by greenhouse gas emissions per person.

The IEA estimates that the richest decile in the US emits over 55 tonnes of CO_{2} per capita each year. Because coal-fired power stations are gradually shutting down, in the 2010s emissions from electricity generation fell to second place behind transportation which is now the largest single source. In 2020, 27% of the GHG emissions of the United States were from transportation, 25% from electricity, 24% from industry, 13% from commercial and residential buildings and 11% from agriculture.

== Impact on the natural environment ==
According to the Fifth National Climate Assessment, climate change has many different impacts on the natural environment in the USA. Especially important are the effects on water: in some places there is a lack of water (drought) while in others there is too much (flooding).

=== Temperature and weather changes ===
As a result of global warming, average springtime temperatures have risen in the 48 contiguous states since the middle of the 20th century.

Average U.S. acreage burned annually by wildfires has almost tripled in three decades.

Analyzing >250 US cities, all but two experienced fewer freezing days in 2025 than in 1956. In 2025, on average, freezing days began 11 days later and ended 26 days earlier.

Human-induced climate change has the potential to alter the prevalence and severity of extreme weather events such as heat waves, cold waves, storms, floods and droughts. A 2012 Intergovernmental Panel on Climate Change (IPCC) report confirmed that a strong body of evidence links global warming to an increase in heat waves, a rise in episodes of heavy rainfall and other precipitation, and more frequent coastal flooding.

According to the American government's Climate Change Science Program, "With continued global warming, heat waves and heavy downpours are very likely to further increase in frequency and intensity. Substantial areas of North America are likely to have more frequent droughts of greater severity. Hurricane wind speeds, rainfall intensity, and storm surge levels are likely to increase. The strongest cold season storms are likely to become more frequent, with stronger winds and more extreme wave heights." Also, based on climate-driven weakening of day-night weather constraints, a study published in Science Advances estimated that from 1975 to 2024, annual potential burning hours for wildfires in North America rose 36%.

In 2022, Climate Central reported that, since 1970, the U.S. is 2.6 °F (1.4 °C) warmer, all 49 states analyzed^{(Hawaii data not available)} warmed by at least 1.8 °F (1.0 °C), and 244 of 246 U.S. cities analyzed warmed. Many of the fastest-warming locations were in the drought-prone Southwest, with Reno, Nevada, warming by +7.7 °F (4.3 °C). Alaska warmed by 4.3° F (2.4 °C), where melting glaciers contribute to sea level rise, and permafrost melt releases greenhouse gases. Ninety percent of U.S. counties experienced a federal climate disaster between 2011 and 2021, with some having as many as 12 disasters during that time.

=== Extreme weather events ===
The number of $1 billion Atlantic hurricanes almost doubled from the 1980s to the 2010s, and inflation-adjusted costs have increased more than elevenfold.

Extreme precipitation events have become more common over recent decades.

Climate change's increase of water temperatures intensified peak wind speeds in all eleven 2024 Atlantic hurricanes.

The number and severity of high-cost extreme weather events has increased in the 21st century in the United States, and some of these are because of global warming. By August 2011 alone, the NOAA had registered nine distinct extreme weather disasters for that year, each totalling $1 billion or more in economic losses. Total losses for 2011 were evaluated as more than $35 billion before Hurricane Irene.

Though the costs and frequency of cyclones have increased on the east coast, it remains unclear whether these effects have been driven primarily by climate change. When correcting for this, a comprehensive 2006 article in Geophysical Research Letters found "no significant change in global net tropical cyclone activity" during past decades, a period when considerable warming of ocean water temperatures occurred. However, the study found major regional shifts, including a general rise of activity in the North Atlantic area, including on the U.S. eastern coast.

From 1898 through 1913, there have been 27 cold waves which totalled 58 days. Between 1970 and 1989, there were about 12 such events. From 1989 until January 6, 2014, there were none. The one on the latter date caused consternation because of decreased frequency of such experiences.

Looking at the lack of certainty as to the causes of the 1995 to present increase in Atlantic extreme storm activity, a 2007 article in Nature used proxy records of vertical wind shear and sea surface temperature to create a long-term model. The authors found that "the average frequency of major hurricanes decreased gradually from the 1760s until the early 1990s, reaching anomalously low values during the 1970s and 1980s." As well, they also found that "hurricane activity since 1995 is not unusual compared to other periods of high hurricane activity in the record and thus appears to represent a recovery to normal hurricane activity, rather than a direct response to increasing sea surface temperature." The researches stated that future evaluations of climate change effects should focus on the magnitude of vertical wind shear for answers.

The frequency of tornadoes in the U.S. has increased, and some of this trend takes place due to climatological changes though other factors such as better detection technologies also play large roles. According to a 2003 study in Climate Research, the total tornado hazards resulting in injury, death, or economic loss "shows a steady decline since the 1980s." The authors reported that tornado "deaths and injuries decreased over the past fifty years." They state that additional research must look into regional and temporal variability in the future.

==== Heat waves ====
In recent decades in the U.S., the number of record daily high temperatures has grown to more than twice that of record daily lows.

The heat-related death rate in the U.S. (heat being either an underlying or a contributing cause) has increased since the mid 2010s.

US heat waves have increased in frequency, average duration, and intensity.

Also, heat wave seasons have grown in length.

Over decades, the average number of days spent in heat waves in the U.S. annually has increased, based on increases in both the average annual number of heat waves and on their average durations.

From the 1960s the amount and longevity of heat waves have increased in the contiguous United States. The general effect of climate changes has been found in the journal Nature Climate Change to have caused increased likelihood of heat waves and extensive downpours. Concerns exist that, as stated by a National Institutes of Health (NIH) study in 2003, increasing "heat and humidity, at least partially related to anthropogenic climate change, suggest that a long-term increase in heat-related mortality could occur." However, the report found that, in general, "over the past 35 years, the U.S. populace has become systematically less affected by hot and humid weather conditions" while "mortality during heat stress events has declined despite increasingly stressful weather conditions in many urban and suburban areas." Thus, as stated in the study, "there is no simple association between increased heat wave duration or intensity and higher mortality rates" with current death rates being largely preventable, the NIH deeply urging American public health officials and physicians to inform patients about mitigating heat-related weather and climate effects on their bodies.

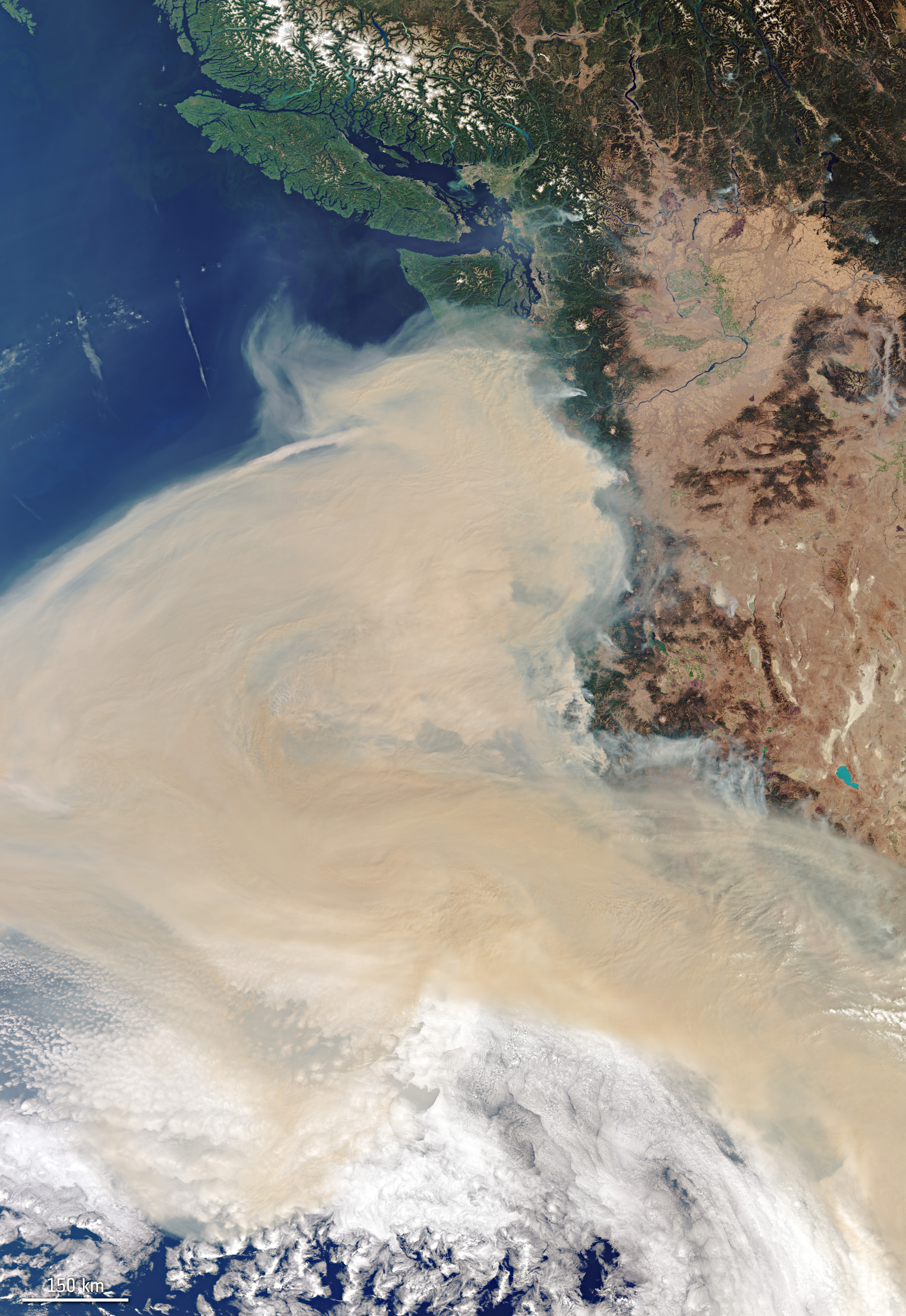
Hotter temperatures and drier weather due to climate change has been linked to wildfires, such as those in California in 2020.

In 2021 an unprecedented heat wave occurred in the northwest linked to climate change. The heatwave brought temperatures close to 122 °F (50 °C) to many areas that generally do not experience such heat like Portland and Seattle, killed 500 people and caused 180 wildfires in British Columbia in Canada. The heat wave was made 150 times more likely by climate change. According to World Weather Attribution such events occur every 1,000 years in today climate but if the temperature will rise by 2 degrees above preindustrial levels, such events will occur each 5–10 years. However, it was more severe than predicted climate models. Significant impacts in that area were expected in the Pacific Northwest only by the middle of the 21st century. Currently, scientists search ways to make the predictions more accurate because: "researchers need to assess whether places such as North America or Germany will face extremes like the heat dome and the floods every 20 years, 10 years, 5 years – or maybe even every year. This level of accuracy currently isn't possible".

The leading cause of animal extinction rates within the United States is due to rising temperatures and heat waves. Science writer Mark C. Urban states, "Species must disperse into newly suitable habitats as fast as climate shifts across landscapes." The risk of extinction among species isn't as detrimental in the United States as compared to other countries such as, "South America, Australia, and New Zealand." Due to these species needing to adapt as fast as rising temperature, Urban stresses the idea of countries who are at great risk, and even those who aren't to adapt strategies to limit further advances in rising temperatures and climate change.

==== Droughts ====
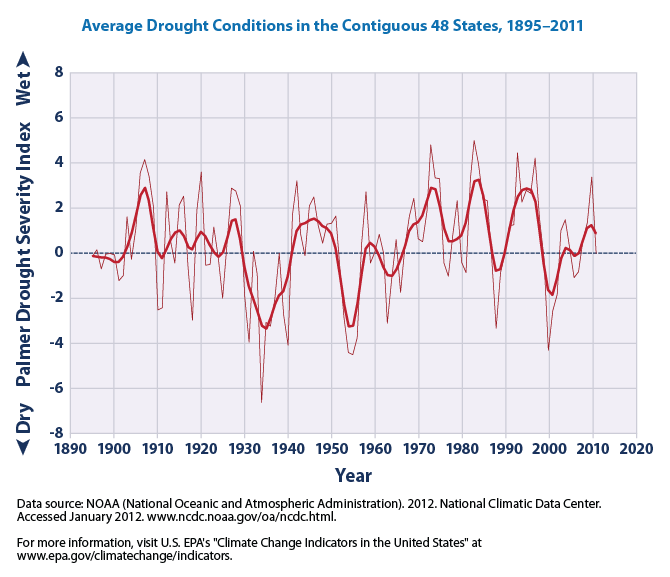
EPA-reported drought conditions for the 48 contiguous states. The curve is a nine-year weighted average. Wet and rainy conditions versus moments of drought in the U.S. have varied significantly over the past several decades.

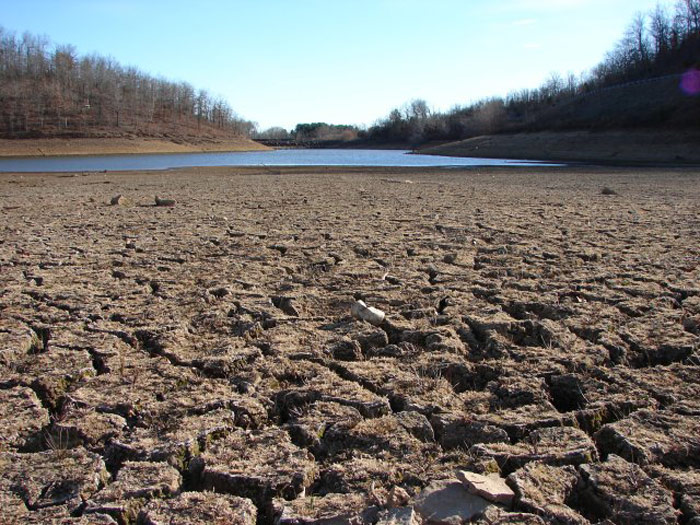
A dry lakebed in California in its worst megadrought in 1,200 years, intensified by climate change, causing water rationing in the state.

Within a long period of groundwater depletion, short periods of recovery were mostly driven by extreme weather events that typically caused flooding and had negative social, environmental and economic consequences.

A 2006 study suggested that drought conditions appear to be worsening in the southwest while improving in the northeast. In the years 2000–2021 the southwestern North American megadrought persisted. Climate change increased temperature, reduced the amount of precipitation, decreased snowpack and increased the ability of air to soak humidity, helping to create arid conditions. As of 2021 the drought was the most severe in the last 500 years. As of 30 June 2021 61% of continental USA were in drought conditions. Demand for water and cooling rose. In June 2021 water restrictions entered into force in California. A 2007 peer-reviewed study found that climate-induced droughts in regions like California have already caused observable ecological disruptions, including reduced plant productivity, altered species distributions, and increased mortality in amphibians and small mammals. Climate change is responsible for 50% of the severity of the drought in California. Water restrictions are expected to expand on many states in the US west, farmers are already affected. In San Francisco a hydropower plant can stop work due to lack of water.

A study published in Nature Climate Change concluded that 2000–2021 was the driest 22-year period in southwestern North America since at least 800 CE. One of the study's researchers said that, without climate change, the drought would probably have ended in 2005. 42% of the megadrought's severity is said to be attributable to temperature rise as a result of climate change, with 88% of the area being drought-stricken. In 2020–2021, the Colorado River, feeding seven states, shrank to the lowest two-year average in more than a century of record keeping.

==== Megafloods ====
A study published in Science Advances in 2022 stated that climate-caused changes in atmospheric rivers affecting California had already doubled the likelihood of megafloods—which can involve 100 inches (250 cm) of rain and/or melted snow in the mountains per month, or 25 to 34 feet (7.6 to 10.4 m) of snow in the Sierra Nevada—and runoff in a future extreme storm scenario is predicted to be 200 to 400% greater than historical values in the Sierra Nevada.

==== Weakened polar vortex jet stream ====
Climate scientists have hypothesised that the stratospheric polar vortex jet stream will gradually weaken as a result of global warming and thus influence U.S. conditions. This trend could possibly cause changes in the future such as increasing frost in certain areas. The magazine Scientific American noted in December 2014 that ice cover on the Great Lakes had recently "reached its second-greatest extent on record", showing climate variability. In February 2021 when the United States, officially rejoined the Paris Agreement, John Kerry spoke about it, mentioning the latest extreme cold events in the USA that in his opinion: "related to climate because the polar vortex penetrates further south because of the weakening of the jet stream related to warming." This opinion is shared by many climate scientists.

=== Sea level rise ===
NOAA predicts different levels of sea level rise through 2050 for the various U.S. coastlines (shown), further projecting that a failure to curb future emissions could cause a total of 3.5-7 feet (1.1-2.1 m) rise by 2100.

High tide flooding, also called tidal flooding, has become much more common in the past seven decades.

Adaptation measures for tidal flooding, such as sea walls and building up roadway heights, are predicted to last only a few decades.

The number of floods declared to be disasters by the Federal Emergency Management Agency (FEMA) has increased, especially since 2010.

Sea level rise has taken place in the U.S. for decades, going back to the 19th century. 40% of the U.S. population live near a coast, and are vulnerable to sea level rise. For almost all coastal areas of the US, except for Alaska, the future rise in sea level is expected to be higher than the global average. NOAA's Global and Regional Sea Level Rise Scenarios said in February 2022 that relative sea level along the contiguous U.S. coastline is expected to rise on average as much over the next 30 years—25 to 30 centimetres (9.8 to 11.8 in)—as it has over the preceding 100 years.

More specifically, NOAA's February 2022 Sea Level Rise Technical Report estimated that rise in the following three decades is anticipated to be, on average: 10-14 inches (0.25-0.35 m) for the East coast; 14-18 inches (0.35-0.45 m) for the Gulf coast; 4-8 inches (0.1-0.2 m) for the West coast; 8-10 inches (0.2-0.25 m) for the Caribbean; 6-8 inches (0.15-0.2 m) for the Hawaiian Islands; and 8-10 inches (0.2-0.25 m) for northern Alaska. Also, by 2050, "moderate" (typically damaging) flooding is expected to occur, on average, more than 10 times as often as it does today, and "major" (often destructive) flooding is expected to occur five times as often as it does today.

The U.S. Geological Survey has conducted research on sea level rise, addressing coastal vulnerability, and incorporating six physical variables to analyze the changes in sea level: geomorphology, coastal slope (percent), rate of relative sea level rise (mm/yr), shoreline erosion and acceleration rates (m/yr), mean tidal range (m), and mean wave height (m). The research was conducted on the various coastline areas of the United States. Along the Pacific coast, the most vulnerable areas are low-lying beaches, and "their susceptibility is primarily a function of geomorphology and coastal slope." From research along the Atlantic coast, the most vulnerable areas to sea level rise were found to be along the Mid-Atlantic coast (Maryland to North Carolina) and Northern Florida, since these are "typically high-energy coastlines where the regional coastal slope is low and where the major landform type is a barrier island." For the Gulf coast, the most vulnerable areas are along the Louisiana-Texas coast. According to the results, "the highest-vulnerability areas are typically lower-lying beach and marsh areas; their susceptibility is primarily a function of geomorphology, coastal slope and rate of relative sea-level rise."

Coastal regions would be most affected by rising sea levels. The increase in sea level along the coasts of continents, especially North America are much more significant than the global average. According to 2007 estimates by the Intergovernmental Panel on Climate Change (IPCC), "global average sea level will rise between 0.6 and 2 feet (0.18 to 0.59 meters) in the next century. Along the U.S. Mid-Atlantic and Gulf Coasts, however, the sea level rose 5 to 6 in (130 to 150 mm) in the last century, which is more than the global average. This is due to the subsiding of coastal lands. The sea level along the U.S. Pacific coast has also increased more than the global average, but less than along the Atlantic coast. This can be explained by the varying continental margins along both coasts; the Atlantic type continental margin is characterized by a wide, gently sloping continental shelf, while the Pacific type continental margin incorporates a narrow shelf and slope descending into a deep trench. Since low-sloping coastal regions should retreat faster than higher-sloping regions, the Atlantic coast is more vulnerable to sea level rise than the Pacific coast.

A rise in sea level will have a negative impact not only on coastal property and economy, but on our supply of fresh water. According to the EPA, "Rising sea level increases the salinity of both surface water and ground water through salt water intrusion." Coastal estuaries and aquifers are therefore at a high risk of becoming too saline from rising sea levels. With respect to estuaries, an increase in salinity would threaten aquatic animals and plants that cannot tolerate high levels of salinity. Aquifers often serve as a primary water supply to surrounding areas, such as Florida's Biscayne aquifer, which receives freshwater from the Everglades and then supplies water to the Florida Keys. Rising sea levels would submerge low-lying areas of the Everglades, and salinity would greatly increase in portions of the aquifer. The considerable rise in sea level and the decreasing amounts of freshwater along the Atlantic and Gulf coasts would make those areas rather uninhabitable. Many economists predict that global warming will be one of the main economic threats to the West Coast, specifically in California. "Low-lying coastal areas, such as along the Gulf Coast, are particularly vulnerable to sea-level rise and stronger storms—and those risks are reflected in rising insurance rates and premiums. In Florida, for example, the average price of a homeowners' policy increased by 77 percent between 2001 and 2006."

Another important coastal habitat that is threatened by sea level rise is wetlands, which "occur along the margins of estuaries and other shore areas that are protected from the open ocean and include swamps, tidal flats, coastal marshes and bayous." Wetlands are extremely vulnerable to rising sea levels, since they are within several feet of sea level. The threat posed to wetlands is serious, due to the fact that they are highly productive ecosystems, and they have an enormous impact on the economy of surrounding areas. Wetlands in the U.S. are rapidly disappearing due to an increase in housing, industry, and agriculture, and rising sea levels contribute to this dangerous trend. As a result of rising sea levels, the outer boundaries of wetlands tend to erode, forming new wetlands more inland. According to the EPA, "the amount of newly created wetlands, however, could be much smaller than the lost area of wetlands— especially in developed areas protected with bulkheads, dikes, and other structures that keep new wetlands from forming inland." When estimating a sea level rise within the next century of 50 cm (20 inches), the U.S. would lose 38% to 61% of its existing coastal wetlands.

Beachfront property is at risk from eroding land and rising sea levels. Since the threat posed by rising sea levels has become more prominent, property owners and local government have taken measures to prepare for the worst. For example, "Maine has enacted a policy declaring that shorefront buildings will have to be moved to enable beaches and wetlands to migrate inland to higher ground." Additionally, many coastal states add sand to their beaches to offset shore erosion, and many property owners have elevated their structures in low-lying areas. As a result of the erosion and ruin of properties by large storms on coastal lands, governments have looked into buying land and having residents relocate further inland.

==== Locations in the US with low elevation above sea level ====
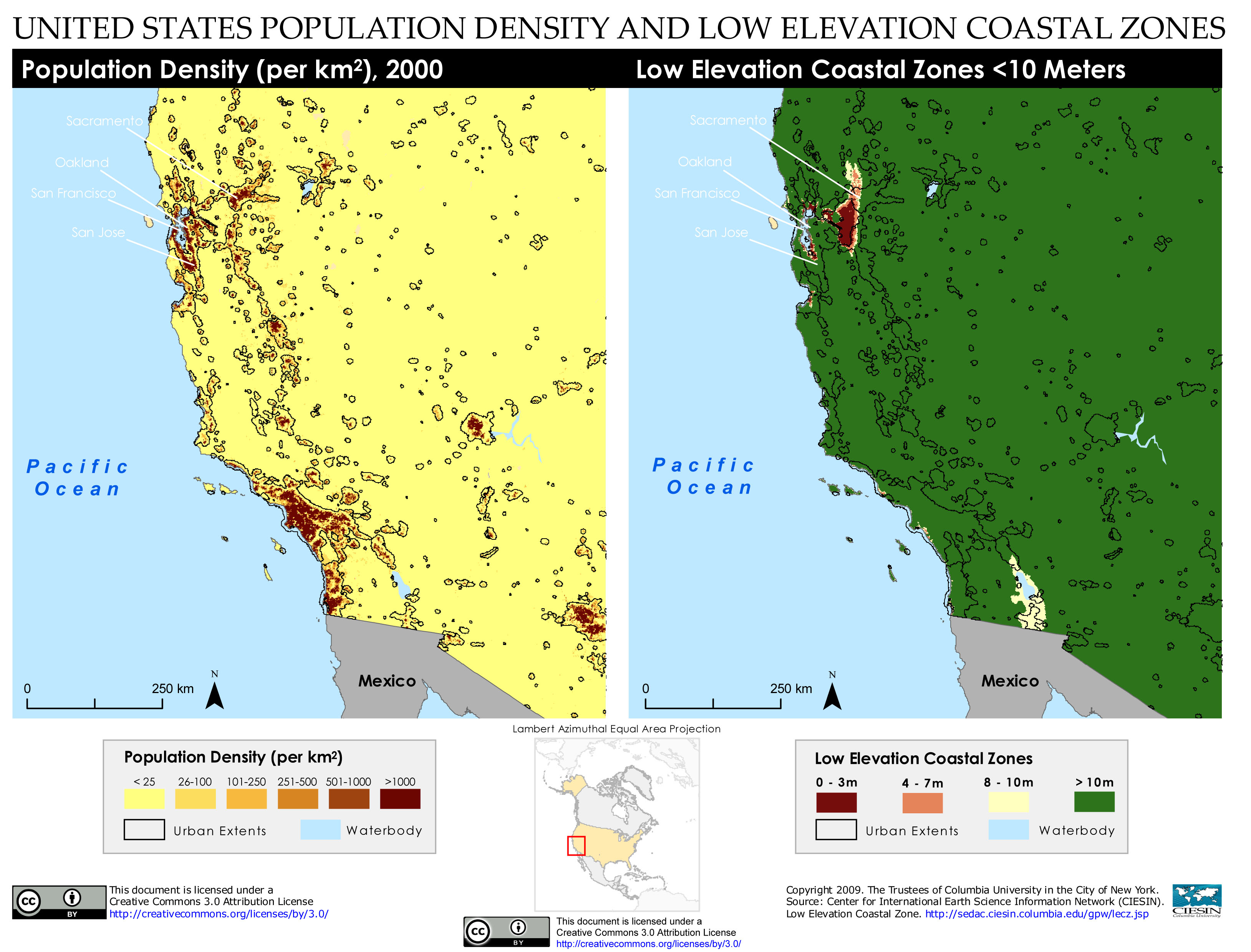
Western United States

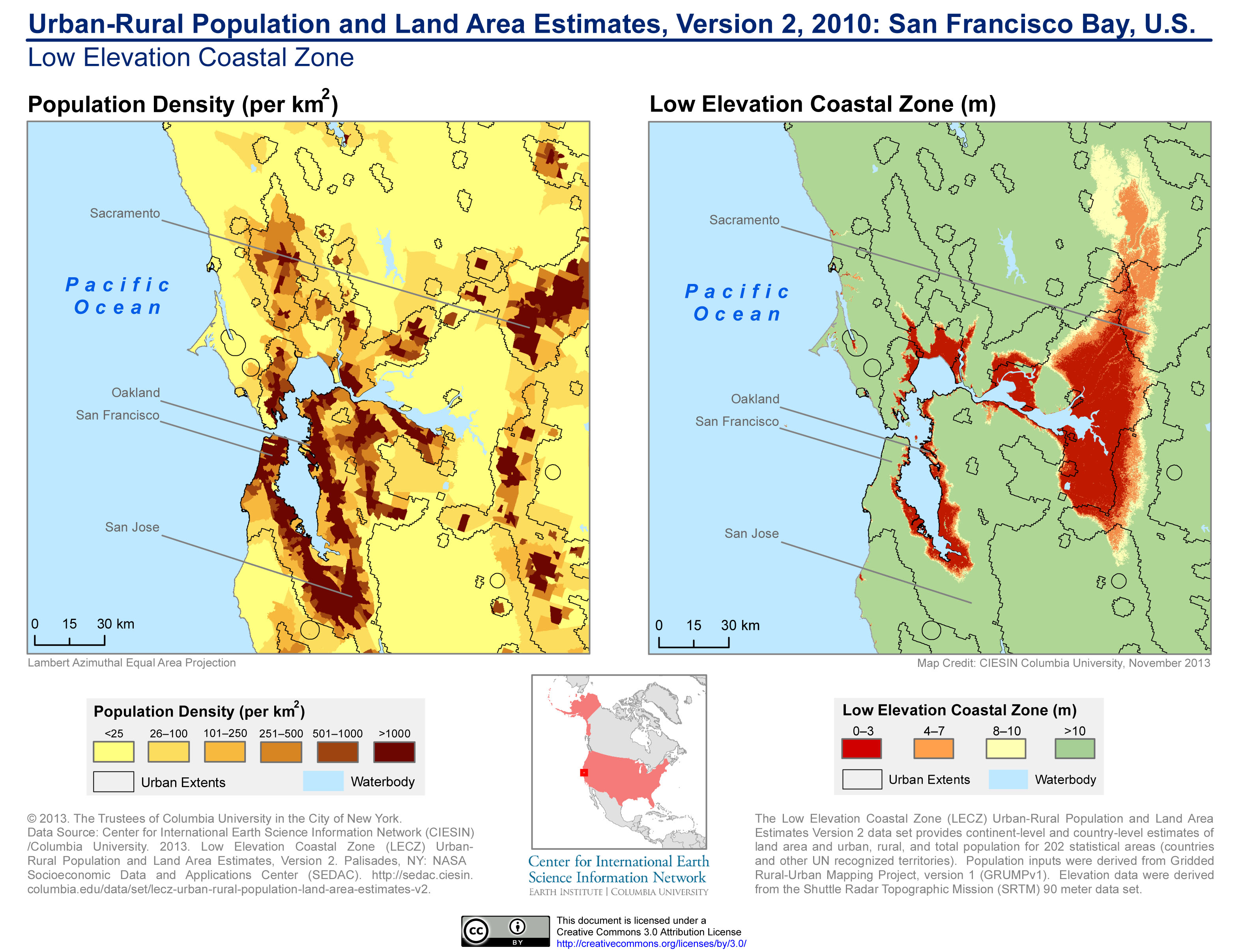
San Francisco Bay Area

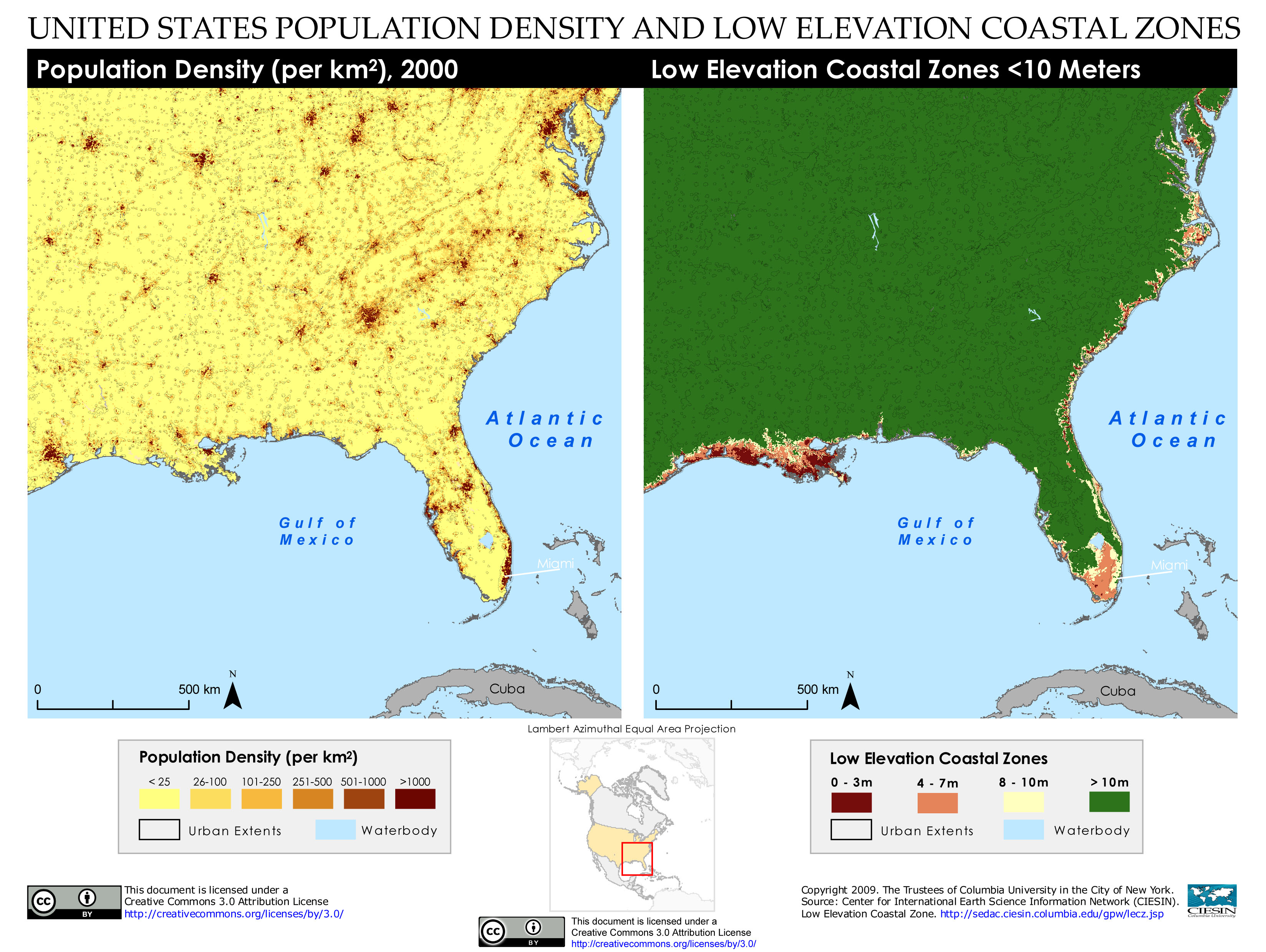
Southeastern United States

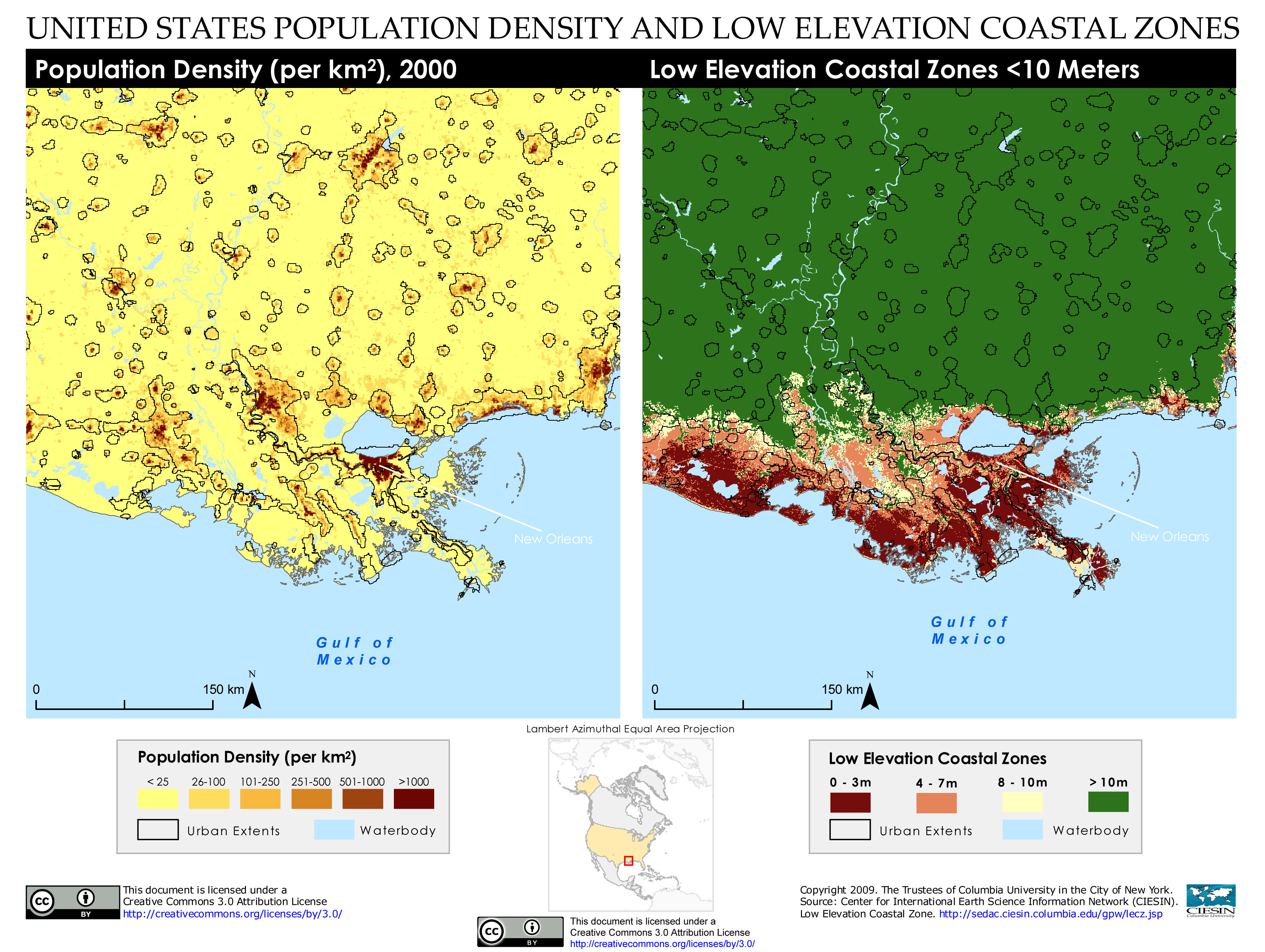
New Orleans and the Mississippi River Delta

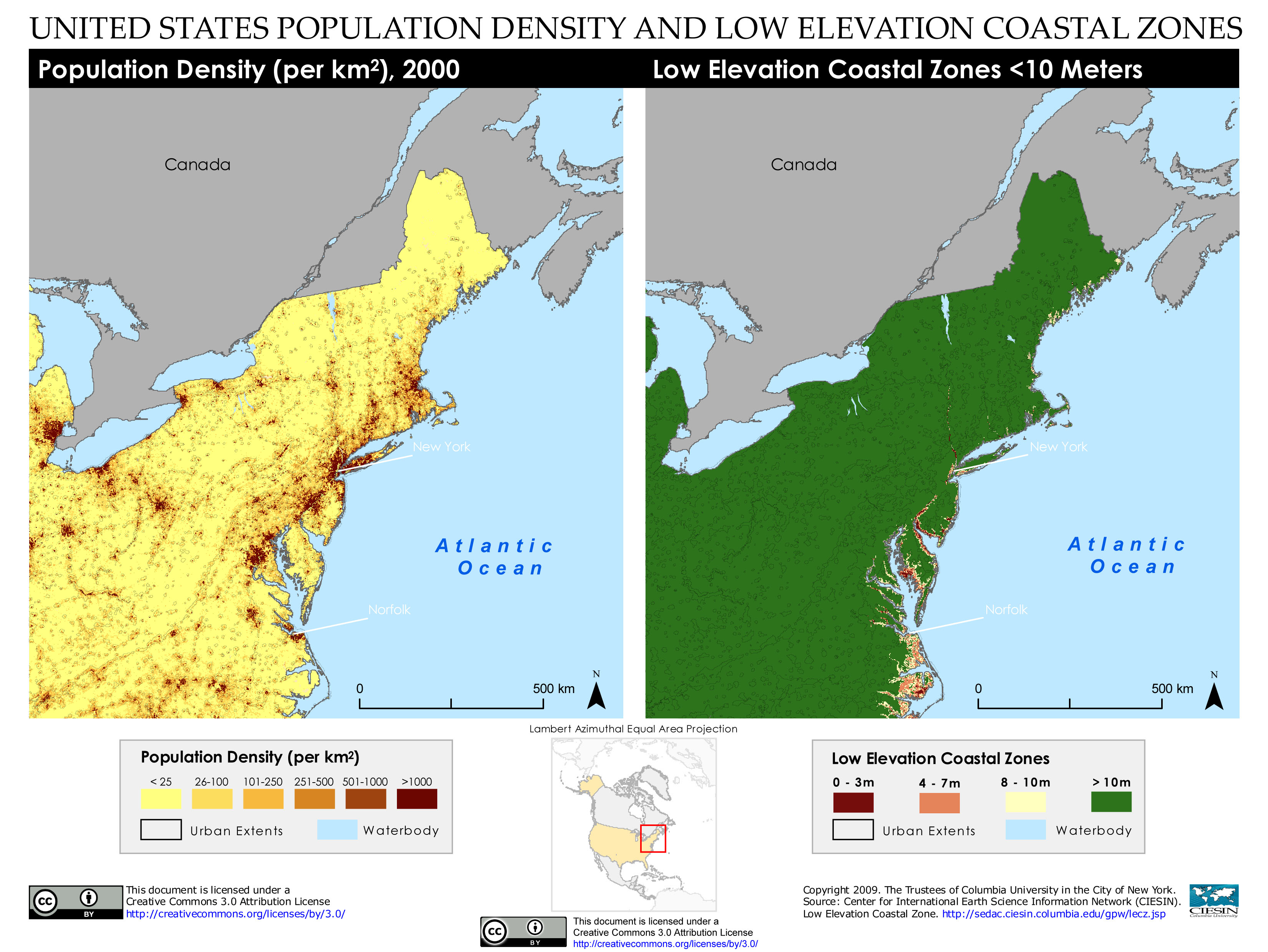
Northeastern United States

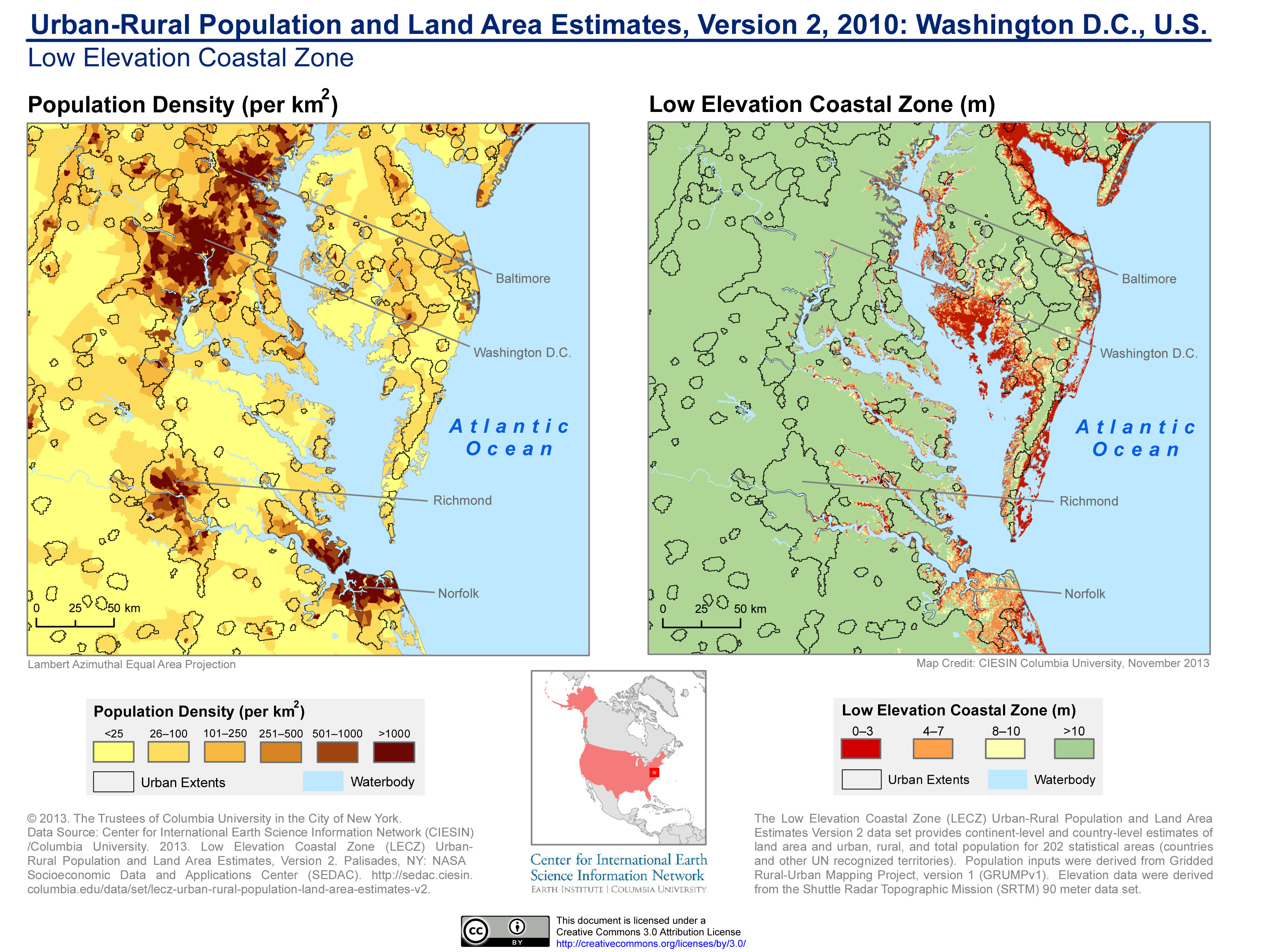
Chesapeake Bay and Delaware Bay

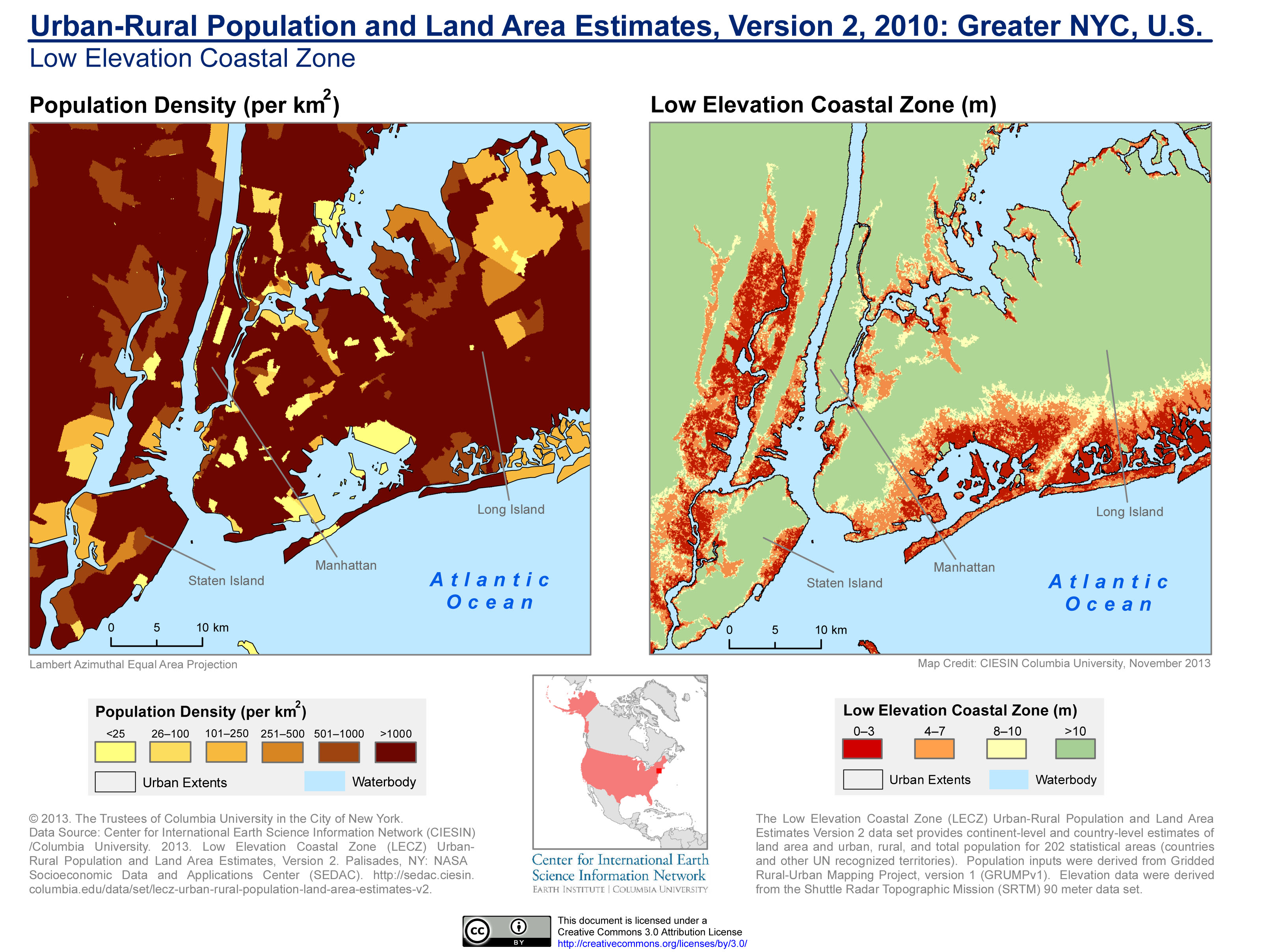
New York City

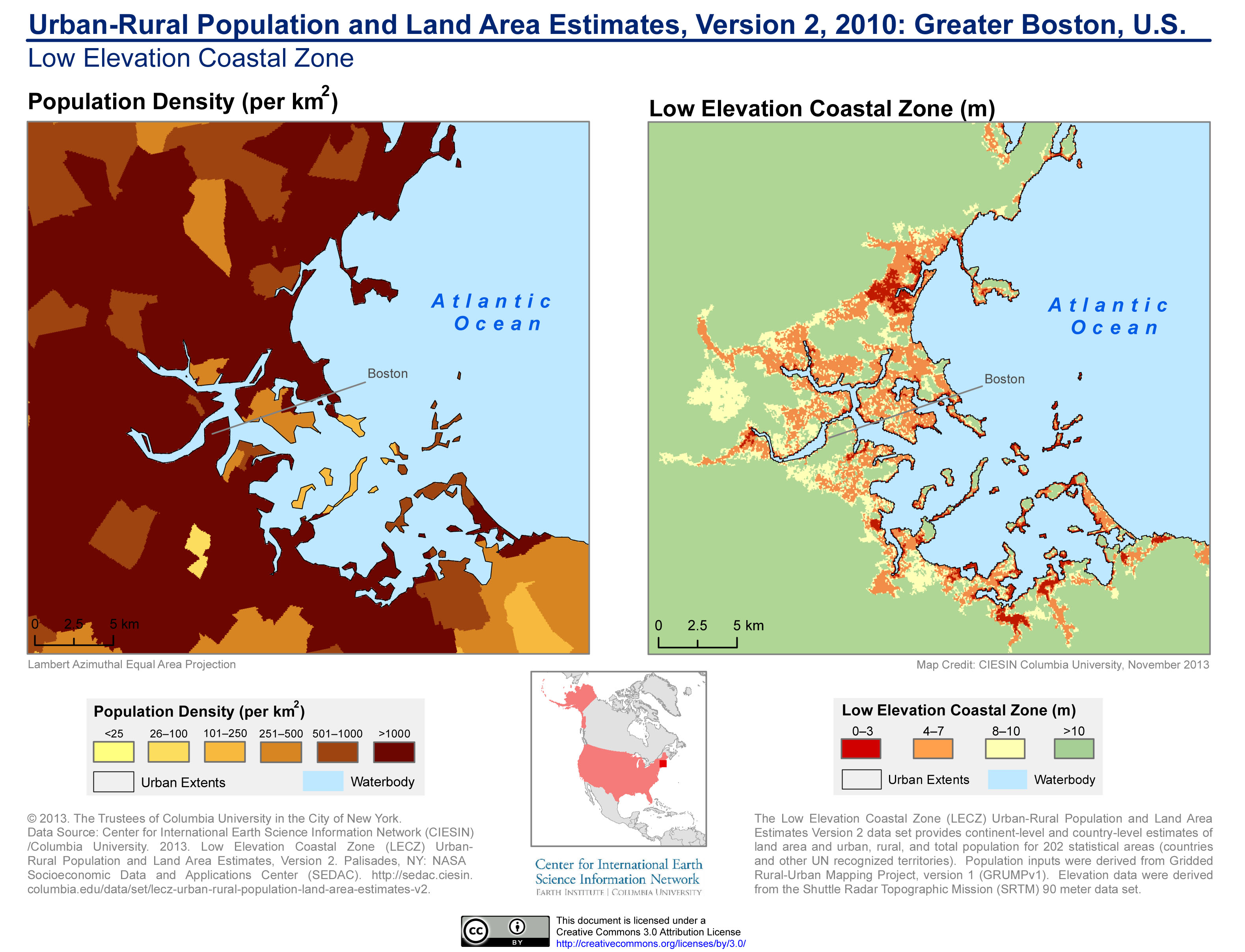
Boston

=== Freshwater ecosystems ===
A study published in 2009 delves into the effects to be felt by lotic (flowing) and lentic (still) freshwater ecosystems in the American Northeast. According to the study, persistent rainfall, typically felt year round, will begin to diminish and rates of evaporation will increase, resulting in drier summers and more sporadic periods of precipitation throughout the year. Additionally, a decrease in snowfall is expected, which leads to less runoff in the spring when snow thaws and enters the watershed, resulting in lower-flowing fresh water rivers. This decrease in snowfall also leads to increased runoff during winter months, as rainfall cannot permeate the frozen ground usually covered by water-absorbing snow. These effects on the water cycle will wreak havoc for indigenous species residing in fresh water lakes and streams.

== Socioeconomic impacts ==
At least 72% of Chinese, American and European respondents to a 2020−2021 European Investment Bank climate survey stated that climate change had an impact on everyday life.

The Fifth National Climate Assessment states that climate change impacts communities over all the territory of the United States. The impacts differ from state to state. The human and economic toll is high. Scientists now can say with relatively high confidence how much climate change impacted a specific meteorological event. The impacts mentioned in the report include, increase in frequency and magnitude of heat waves, droughts, floods, hurricanes and more.

An article in Science predicts that the Southern states, such as Texas, Florida, and the Deep South will be economically affected by climate change more severely than northern states (some of which would even gain benefits), but that economic impacts of climate change would likely exacerbate preexisting economic inequality in the country. In September 2020, a subcommittee of the Commodity Futures Trading Commission issued a report that concluded that climate change poses systemic risks to the U.S. financial system, while the Financial Stability Oversight Council released a report in October 2021 that identified climate change as an emerging and increasing threat to the stability of the U.S. financial system.

A 2021 survey of 1,422 members of the American Economic Association found that 86 percent of professional economists generally agreed with the statement: "Climate change poses a major risk to the US economy." In September 2023, the U.S. Treasury Department issued a report in consultation with the Financial Literacy and Education Commission found that 13% of Americans experienced financial hardship in 2022 due to the effects of climate change after $176 billion in weather disasters. In April 2024, Consumer Reports announced the release of a report commissioned from ICF International that estimated that climate change could cost Americans born in 2024 nearly $500,000 over their lifetimes.

A 2026 study published in Nature estimated that, from 1990 through 2020, carbon dioxide emissions in the US caused $10.2 trillion in cumulative damages by 2020, with about 30% occurring within the US itself. The researchers said that future damages from past emissions are at least an order of magnitude larger than historical damages from the same emissions.

=== Agriculture and food security ===
The 2018 the Fourth National Climate Assessment notes that regional economies dominated by agriculture may have additional vulnerabilities from climate change. Joseph Stiglitz, Nobel prize-winning economist, notes that climate-related disasters in 2017 cost the equivalent of 1.5% of GDP. Crop and livestock production will be increasingly challenged. In March 2024, Communications Earth & Environment published a study that estimated that food prices could rise by an average of 3% per year over the subsequent decade.

Climate change and agriculture are complexly related processes. In the United States, agriculture is the second largest emitter of greenhouse gases (GHG), behind the energy sector. Direct GHG emissions from the agricultural sector account for 8.4% of total U.S. emissions, but the loss of soil organic carbon through soil erosion indirectly contributes to emissions as well. While agriculture plays a role in propelling climate change, it is also affected by the direct (increase in temperature, change in rainfall, flooding, drought) and secondary (weed, pest, disease pressure, infrastructure damage) consequences of climate change. The United States Department of Agriculture (USDA) is a regulatory, research, and support body in American agriculture. They work to understanding the impact of climate change on farming and to helping American farmers adapt. USDA research indicates that these climatic changes will lead to a decline in yield and nutrient density in key crops, as well as decreased livestock productivity. Climate change poses unprecedented challenges to U.S. agriculture due to the sensitivity of agricultural productivity and costs to changing climate conditions. Rural communities dependent on agriculture are particularly vulnerable to climate change threats. Native communities are also vulnerable, and the Intertribal Agricultural Council (IAC) documents, supports, and advocates for the reintegrative practices of Native American and Alaskan agricultural producers. The IAC is particularly focused on the economic impact and potential of regenerative farming practices for native people.

The US Global Change Research Program (2017) identified four key areas of concern in the agriculture sector: reduced productivity, degradation of resources, health challenges for people and livestock, and the adaptive capacity of agriculture communities.

Large-scale adaptation and mitigation of these threats relies on changes in farming policy.

=== Cost of disaster relief ===
NOAA's National Centers for Environmental Information (NCEI) has reported growing numbers of weather and climate-related events costing at least a billion dollars, exceeding the 1980–2019 inflation-adjusted average of 6.6 such events.

Since 1980, the United States has experienced 323 in climate and weather related disasters, which have cost more than $2.195 trillion in total. According to NOAA's National Centers for Environmental Information (NCEI), 2021 witnessed 20 climate-related disasters, each exceeding losses of $1 billion.

These increasingly common and severe weather events have put pressure on existing disaster-relief efforts. For instance, the increasing rate of wildfires, the increasing length of the fire season, and increasing severity have put pressure on national and international resources. In the US, federal firefighting efforts surpassed $2 billion a year for the first time in 2017, and this expense was repeated in 2018. At the same time, internationally shared capital, such as firefighting planes, has experienced increasing demand, requiring new investment.

=== Culture ===
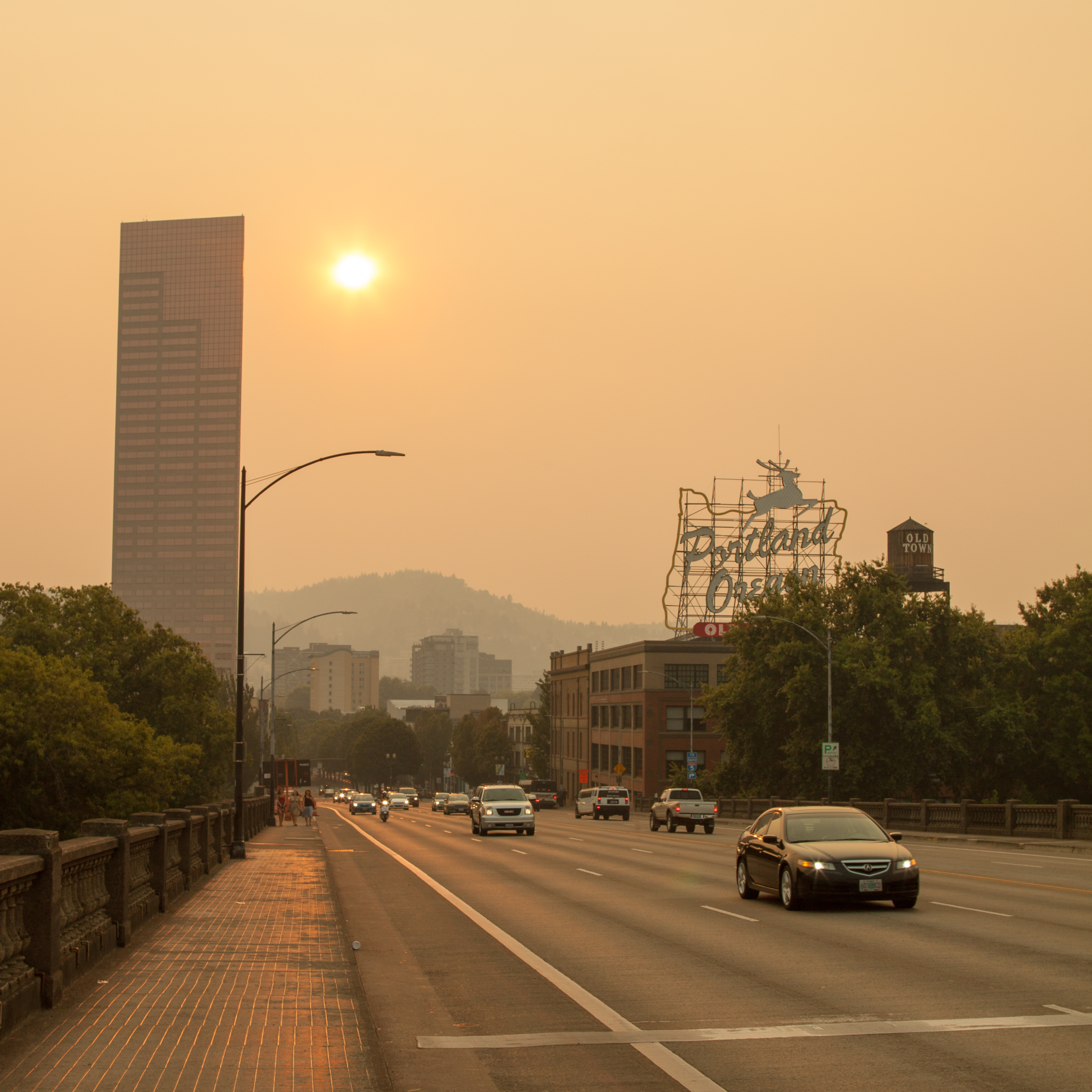
Air pollution on the Portland skyline, 2015 wildfires

By August 2022, an increasing number of outdoor theater and musical performances, including the Oregon Shakespeare Festival and The Great Passion Play in Arkansas, were being canceled due to wildfire smoke, extreme heat, and heavy rains.

=== Health impacts ===
Climate change is expected to pose increased threats to human health. The physical and psychological effects of climate change in the United States on human health will likely depend on specific location. Researchers have determined that locations of concern are "coastal regions, islands, deserts in the southwest, vector-borne and zoonotic disease border regions, cities, and the U.S. Arctic (Alaska)". Physical impacts include injury and illness from both initial incidents and secondary effects of major weather events or the changing climate. Psychological impacts include post-traumatic stress disorder, forced emigration and social loss related to people's attachment to place and identity. The impacts these have on the individual are felt throughout the community as well. Displacement after a major weather event harms a community's capacity to engage and become resilient.

=== Immigration ===
Climate change has increased migration to the United States from Central America. Due to rising sea levels in coastal areas in the United States, it is projected that 13 million Americans will be forced to move away from submerged coastlines.

=== Indigenous peoples ===
According to Indigenous scholars such as Daniel Wildcat, Zoe Todd, and Kyle Whyte, the experience of modern climate change echoes previous experiences of environmental damage and territorial displacement brought about by European settlement. Colonial practices such as damming and deforestation forced Indigenous peoples to adapt to unfamiliar climates and environments. Thus, the impacts of global climate change are viewed as being not separate from but rather an intensification of the impacts of settler colonialism.

Indigenous scholars and activists argue that colonialist policies—prioritizing exploitation and commoditization of resources over Indigenous teachings favoring environmental stability and seeking a symbiotic relation with nature—have fueled climate change. The United Nations Department of Economic and Social Affairs has stated that "Indigenous peoples are among the first to face the direct consequences of climate change, due to their dependence upon, and close relationship, with the environment and its resources." More specifically, North American tribes' present-day lands are on average more exposed to extreme heat and receive less precipitation, nearly half of tribes experience heightened wildfire hazard exposure, and tribes' present-day lands have less mineral value potential.

Native peoples residing on the Gulf and West Coasts are affected by the rising sea temperatures because that makes the fish and shellfish, that they rely on for food and cultural activities, more susceptible to contamination. In California, climate change has wiped out much of the salmonids and acorns that were a significant portion of the Karuk people's traditional diet. Exploitation practices produce pollution and introduce non-native species, promoting the intensity of climate change. Conservation efforts of the Great Lakes ecosystems are necessary in order to prevent climate change from doing further damage to the environment and the Indigenous communities living there. Increasing temperatures have stunted the growth of wild rice, negatively impacting the Anishinaabe and Ojibwe people's health and culture. The Navajo Nation will experience increasing droughts and air pollution from dust. In Arizona, rising temperatures and more severe rain events will likely exacerbate existing water purity problems, resulting in increased diarrhea and stomach problems, especially among children. In Maine, habitat loss and increasing temperatures, especially in the colder seasons, encourage the survival of ticks. This harms moose populations that Indigenous people have historically relied on.

The Status of Tribes and Climate Change (STACC) report is a US-based report informing on indigenous impacts to climate change, indigenous methods that offer solutions, and how these methods can be implemented in a well-informed and appropriate way. Established in 1992, it takes into consideration Indigenous land sovereignty and personal narratives from Indigenous peoples to ensure that mitigation and adaptation of climate change involves Indigenous people and practices.

==== Hawaii ====
In the last century, climate change has played a part in causing "between 90 and 95 percent of Hawaiʻi's dryland forests" to disappear, which is especially important because many of the native species that exist in Hawaiʻi cannot be found anywhere else on earth. Indigenous communities developed agroecosystems that could have had production levels comparable to consumption today. As such, Indigenous agroecosystems may help climate change mitigation.

==== Alaska ====
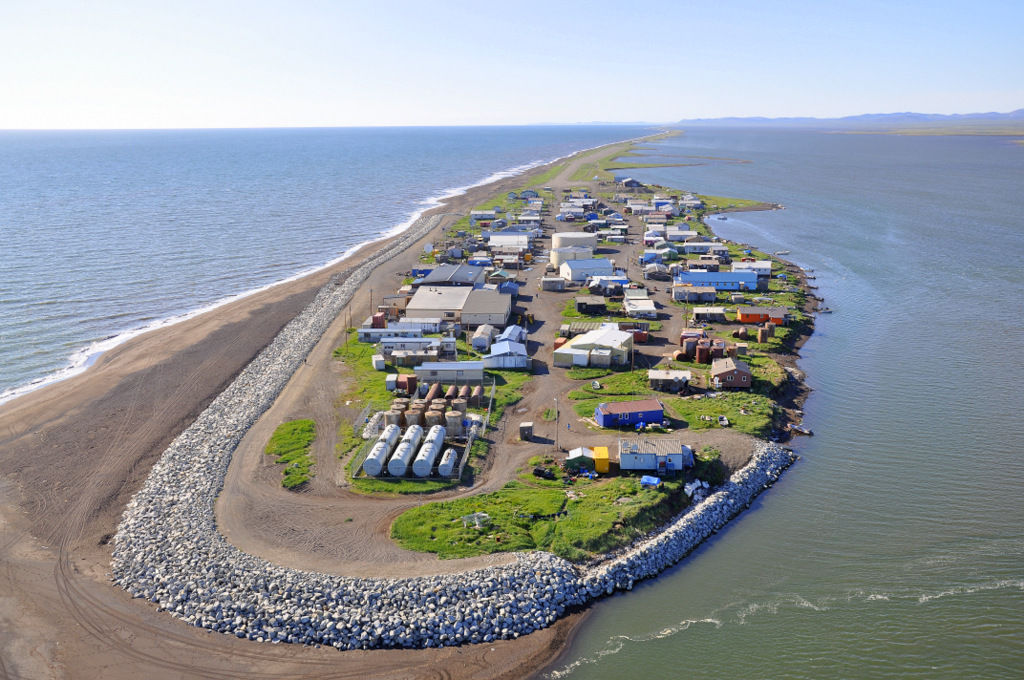
Kivalina, Alaska, is threatened by rising sea levels and coastal erosion.

Thinning sea ice on which some Alaskan tribes traditionally rely for hunting contributes to climigration—migration caused by climate change, a term originally was coined for Arctic Alaska towns and villages. The policy advisor for the National Congress of American Indians has stated that "among indigenous peoples in North America, the Native Americans who continue to practice traditional and subsistence lifestyles to perhaps the highest degree are those in Alaska, where 80% of the diet comes from the immediate surroundings".

Coastal erosion and rising sea levels caused by climate change have threatened coastal communities. For example, reports suggest that melting permafrost, repeated storms, and decrease of land could make Kivalina unlivable by 2025, though some residents do not have the enough money to relocate. Sea ice that historically sheltered the town has retreated, and storms that would have previously hit the ice now reach the town. The decline in ice sheets has been directly linked to a decline in the population of polar bears on which many Indigenous people rely.

Because of melting ice, global climate change makes Arctic Indigenous lands more accessible for resource extraction. Whyte cites a source saying that this increased accessibility brings oil production projects having laborers' camps that "attract violent sex trafficking of Indigenous persons".

Wildfires impact both urban and rural communities, and Indigenous and non-Indigenous communities. However, Indigenous communities do not have the same economic resources to deal with these fires, and their lifestyles and cultures are more dependent on the land. Rural communities rely more on surrounding land for wild food harvest and nutritional intake, and thus are at risk for food insecurity.

Warming temperatures in the Arctic allow beavers to extend their habitat further north, where their dams impair boat travel, impact access to food, affect water quality, and endanger downstream fish populations. Pools formed by the dams store heat, thus changing local hydrology and causing localized thawing of permafrost that in turn contributes to global warming.

For generations, people in Alaska's far-north whaling villages have relied on ice cellars (food caches) dug deep into the permafrost to store and age their subsistence food, and keep it cold throughout the year. However, global warming—along with changes in sediment chemistry, local hydrology, and urbanization—are causing ice cellars to fail through flooding and collapse.

=== Insurance ===
The effects of climate change on extreme weather events is requiring the insurance industry in the United States to recalculate risk assessments for various lines of insurance. From 1980 to 2005, private and federal government insurers in the United States paid $320 billion in constant 2005 dollars in claims due to weather-related losses while the total amount paid in claims annually generally increased, and 88% of all property insurance losses in the United States from 1980 to 2005 were weather-related. Annual insured natural catastrophe losses in the United States grew 10-fold in inflation-adjusted terms from $49 billion in total from 1959 to 1988 to $98 billion in total from 1989 to 1998, while the ratio of premium revenue to natural catastrophe losses fell six-fold from 1971 to 1999 and natural catastrophe losses were the primary factor in 10% of the approximately 700 U.S. insurance company insolvencies from 1969 to 1999 and possibly a contributing factor in 53%.

From 2005 to 2021, annual insured natural catastrophe losses continued to rise in inflation-adjusted terms with average annual losses increasing by 700% in constant 2021 dollars from 1985 to 2021. In 2005, Ceres released a white paper that found that catastrophic weather-related insurance losses in the United States rose 10 times faster than premiums in inflation-adjusted terms from 1971 to 2004, and projected that climate change would likely cause higher premiums and deductibles and impact the affordability and availability of property insurance, crop insurance, health insurance, life insurance, business interruption insurance, and liability insurance in the United States. From 2013 to 2023, U.S. insurance companies paid $655.7 billion in natural disaster claims with the $295.8 billion paid from 2020 to 2022 setting a record for a three-year period, and after only the Philippines, the United States lost the largest share of its gross domestic product in 2022 of any country due to natural disasters while having the greatest annual economic loss in absolute terms.

In September 2024, Verisk Analytics released an annually issued report that noted that while interannual changes in global insured natural catastrophe losses owes mostly to increased exposure (i.e. growth in the number of insurance policies sold), inflation, and climate variability rather than climate change, the report also summarized company projections that estimated that climate change increases the global average annual insured loss 1% year-over-year (in comparison to 7% that year for exposure growth and inflation), and that the impact of climate change on interannual changes could become comparable to that of climate variability by 2050 due to the former following a compound growth rate. In January 2025, the Federal Insurance Office of the U.S. Treasury Department issued a report that showed that the average home insurance policy premium in the United States rose 8.7% faster than the inflation rate from 2018 through 2022, while the average premium in the top quintile of ZIP Codes for expected annual losses to structures from climate-related perils rose 14.7% faster and the bottom quintile of ZIP Codes fell by 1.4% relative to the inflation rate.

=== Security ===
Climate change is a threat to the national security of the United States, according to the Department of Defense. The President Joe Biden claims that top military officials described climate change as the biggest threat to the security of the country. Army Gen. Mark Milley, the chairman of the Joint Chiefs of Staff said in reaction that from a strictly military point of view Russia and China are the biggest threats but national security is a much broader issue. Studies have also found that some dimensions of climate change increase rates of violent crime. Overall, the IPCC reports with medium confidence that climate change is related to both violent and property crime in the US.

== Mitigation and adaptation ==
=== Mitigation ===
Over centuries, energy consumption has evolved from burning wood to fossil fuels (coal, oil, natural gas), and in recent decades to using nuclear, hydroelectric and other renewable energy sources.

Growth in renewable-source electricity generation has been led by wind and solar.

Total wind plus solar energy electricity generation now exceeds coal-based energy in the U.S.

New installation of wind and solar capacity surged in 2020, but was then affected by sourcing problems for solar panels, supply chain constraints, interconnection issues, and policy uncertainty.

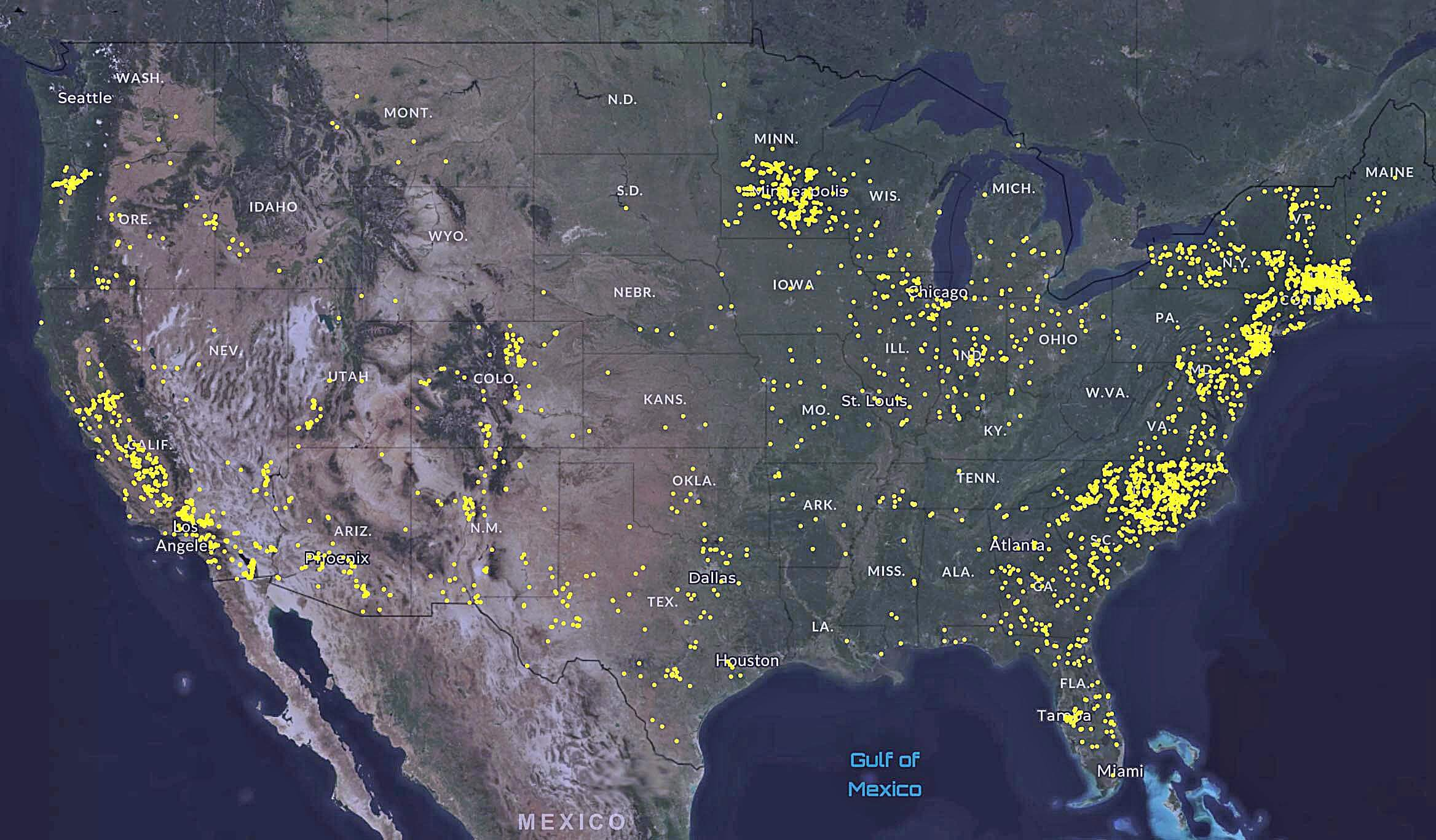
Locations of solar photovoltaic facility locations having a direct current capacity of 1 megawatt or more

Though Texas and California generate the most wind + solar power of all states, various other states generate more wind + solar power per capita.

Calculations in 2021 showed that, for giving the world a 50% chance of avoiding a temperature rise of 2 degrees or more USA should increase its climate commitments by 38%. For a 95% chance it should increase the commitments by 125%. For giving a 50% chance of staying below 1.5 degrees USA should increase its commitments by 203%.

Increasing use of public transport and related transit-oriented development can reduce transportation emissions in human settlements by 78% and overall US emissions by 15%.

In April, 2022, wind and solar energy sources provided more electricity than nuclear power plants, overtaking nuclear for the first time in U.S. history. Clean energy (also including geothermal, hydroelectric and biomass) comprised nearly 30% of the total electricity in the U.S., compared to about 20% in 2021.

Efforts to reduce greenhouse gas emissions by the United States include energy policies which encourage efficiency through programs like Energy Star, Commercial Building Integration, and the Industrial Technologies Program.

In the absence of substantial federal action, state governments have adopted emissions-control laws such as the Regional Greenhouse Gas Initiative in the Northeast and the Global Warming Solutions Act of 2006 in California. In 2019 a new climate change bill was introduced in Minnesota. One of the targets, is making all the energy of the state carbon free, by 2030.

Several pieces of legislation introduced in the 116th and 117th Congresses, including the Climate Stewardship Act of 2019, the Ocean Based Climate Solutions Act of 2020, the Healthy Soil, Resilient Farmers Act of 2020, and the Healthy Soils Healthy Climate Act of 2020, have sought to increase carbon sequestration on private and public lands through financial incentivization.

Several state governments, including California, Hawaii, Maryland, and New York, have passed versions of a carbon farming tax credit, which seek to improve soil health and increase carbon sequestration by offering financial assistance and incentives for farmers who practice regenerative agriculture, carbon farming, and other climate change mitigation practices. The California Healthy Soils Program is estimated to have resulted in 109,809 metric tons of CO_{2} being sequestered annually on average.

A 2011 survey of 568 members of the American Economic Association (AEA) found that 80 percent of professional economists generally agreed with the statement: "The long run benefits of higher taxes on fossil fuels outweigh the short run economic costs." A 2021 survey of 1,422 AEA members found that 88 percent of professional economists generally agreed with the same statement. Relatedly, surveys of AEA members since the 1970s have shown that professional economists generally agree with the statement: "Pollution taxes and marketable pollution permits represent a better approach to pollution control than emission standards." Likewise, in its September 2020 report, the Commodity Futures Trading Commission subcommittee concluded that financial markets will only be able to efficiently channel resources to activities that reduce greenhouse gas emissions if a carbon price that reflects the true social cost of carbon is in place across the economy.

The White House and USDA are reportedly developing plans to use $30 billion in funds from the Commodity Credit Corporation (CCC) for the creation of a carbon bank program, which would involve giving carbon credits to farmers and landowners in return for adopting carbon sequestration practices, which they could then sell in a cap and trade market.

In November 2023, the first commercial direct air capture (DAC) plant in the U.S. began operation. DAC technology captures carbon dioxide—a greenhouse gas contributing to global warming—and seals it permanently in a solid such as concrete. That plant removes only 1,000 tons of carbon dioxide per year, equal to the exhaust from about 200 cars. However, a $1.2 billion Biden administration award for DAC aims to expand the technology and reduce cost per ton.

==== Carbon emissions trading schemes by state and regional programs ====
In 2003, New York State proposed and attained commitments from nine Northeast states to form a cap-and-trade carbon dioxide emissions program for power generators, called the Regional Greenhouse Gas Initiative (RGGI). This program launched on January 1, 2009, with the aim to reduce the carbon "budget" of each state's electricity generation sector to 10% below their 2009 allowances by 2018.

Also in 2003, U.S. corporations were able to trade CO_{2} emission allowances on the Chicago Climate Exchange under a voluntary scheme. In August 2007, the Exchange announced a mechanism to create emission offsets for projects within the United States that cleanly destroy ozone-depleting substances.

In 2006, the California Legislature passed the California Global Warming Solutions Act, AB-32. Thus far, flexible mechanisms in the form of project based offsets have been suggested for three main project types. The project types include: manure management, forestry, and destruction of ozone-depleted substances. However, a ruling from Judge Ernest H. Goldsmith of San Francisco's Superior Court stated that the rules governing California's cap-and-trade system were adopted without a proper analysis of alternative methods to reduce greenhouse gas emissions. The tentative ruling, issued on January 24, 2011, argued that the California Air Resources Board violated state environmental law by failing to consider such alternatives. If the decision is made final, the state would not be allowed to implement its proposed cap-and-trade system until the California Air Resources Board fully complies with the California Environmental Quality Act. However, on June 24, 2011, the Superior Court's ruling was overturned by the Court of Appeals. By 2012, some of the emitters obtained allowances for free, which is for the electric utilities, industrial facilities and natural gas distributors, whereas some of the others have to go to the auction. The California cap-and-trade program came into effect in 2013.

In 2014, the Texas legislature approved a 10% reduction for the Highly Reactive Volatile Organic Compound (HRVOC) emission limit. This was followed by a 5% reduction for each subsequent year until a total of 25% percent reduction was achieved in 2017.

In February 2007, five U.S. states and four Canadian provinces joined to create the Western Climate Initiative (WCI), a regional greenhouse gas emissions trading system. In July 2010, a meeting took place to further outline the cap-and-trade system. In November 2011, Arizona, Montana, New Mexico, Oregon, Utah and Washington withdrew from the WCI. As of 2021, only the U.S. state of California and the Canadian province of Quebec participate in the WCI.

In 1997, the State of Illinois adopted a trading program for volatile organic compounds in most of the Chicago area, called the Emissions Reduction Market System. Beginning in 2000, over 100 major sources of pollution in eight Illinois counties began trading pollution credits.

=== Adaptation ===
The state of California enacted the first comprehensive state-level climate action plan with its 2009 "California Climate Adaptation Strategy." California's electrical grid has been impacted by the increased fire risks associated with climate change. In the 2019 "red flag" warning about the possibility of wildfires declared in some areas of California, the electricity company Pacific Gas and Electric (PG&E) was required to shut down power to prevent inflammation of trees that touch the electricity lines. Millions were impacted.

Within the state of Florida four counties (Broward, Miami-Dade, Monroe, Palm Beach) have created the Southeast Florida Regional Climate Change Compact in order to coordinate adaptation and mitigation strategies to cope with the impact of climate change on the region. The Commonwealth of Massachusetts has issued grants to coastal cities and towns for adaptation activities such as fortification against flooding and preventing coastal erosion.

New York State is requiring climate change be taken into account in certain infrastructure permitting, zoning, and open space programs; and is mapping sea level rise along its coast. After Hurricane Sandy, New York and New Jersey accelerated voluntary government buy-back of homes in flood-prone areas. New York City announced in 2013 it planned to spend between $10 and $20 billion on local flood protection, reduction of the heat island effect with reflective and green roofs, flood-hardening of hospitals and public housing, resiliency in food supply, and beach enhancement; rezoned to allow private property owners to move critical features to upper stories; and required electrical utilities to harden infrastructure against flooding.

In 2019, a $19.1 billion "disaster relief bill" was approved by the Senate. The bill should help the victims of extreme weather that was partly fueled by climate change.

In mid February 2014, President Barack Obama announced his plan to propose a $1 billion "Climate Resilience Fund". Obama's fund incorporates facets of both urban resiliency and human resiliency theories, by necessarily improving communal infrastructure and by focusing on societal preparation to decrease the country's vulnerability to the impacts of climate change.

==== Traditional Ecological Knowledge (TEK) ====
A 2013 USDA Technical Report stated that Indigenous peoples' traditional ecological knowledge (TEK) has the potential to play a vital role in indigenous climate change assessment and adaptation efforts, and that contributions from both Western science and TEK knowledge systems are imperative. Bridging these two knowledge systems is said to "produce() a better understanding of the issue than either would alone."

Western climate science and TEK represent complementary and overlapping views of the causes and consequences of change. TEK provides information about changes in the natural world useful for adaptation at the community level, information that is not readily available to western science observations. Specifically, TEK—described as the "accumulation of highly localized, experiential, place-based wisdom over a long period, most often passed down orally from generation to generation"—provides wisdom for community-level adaptation. TEK often focuses on phenology (the study of the dates of recurrent natural events such as the flowering of certain plants or the first or last appearance of migrant birds) in relation to seasonal climatic changes. TEK-based adaptations include traditional food substitutions, and adjusting timing sequences of hunting, gathering, and fishing.

==== Adaptive forestry practices ====
Within the United States, federal agencies have developed two overlapping frameworks for guiding their own actions with regard to forest resources, as well as offering guidance for managers of other forest lands within the nation. The first framework is known as RRT (Resistance, Resilience, Transition), and it was developed by U.S. Forest Service research scientists. The National Park Service developed its RAD framework (Resist, Accept, Direct), with assistance from scientists within the U.S. Geological Survey. Both frameworks attribute their origins to a 2007 paper titled "Climate Change and Forests of the Future: Managing in the Face of Uncertainty". The Adaptive Silviculture for Climate Change (ASCC) project is a collaborative effort to establish a series of experimental silvicultural trials across a network of different forest ecosystem types throughout the United States and Canada. It includes staff from both Canadian and U.S. forestry agencies, state forestry agencies, academic institutions, and forestry interest groups.

=== Policies, legislation and legal actions ===
Federal, state, and local governments have all debated climate change policies, but the resulting laws vary considerably. The U.S. Congress has not adopted a comprehensive greenhouse gas emissions reduction scheme, but long-standing environmental laws such as the Clean Air Act have been used by the executive branch and litigants in lawsuits to implement regulations and voluntary agreements. The federal government has the exclusive authority to regulate emissions from new motor vehicles under the Clean Air Act, but has granted the state of California a waiver allowing it to adopt more stringent emission standards. Other states may choose to adopt either the federal standards or California's standards. States also retain authority to regulate emissions from electricity generation and industrial sources, while building energy codes are primarily developed and enforced at the state and local levels. Governments at all levels may also reduce greenhouse gas emissions through measures such as improving the energy efficiency of public buildings, purchasing alternative-fuel vehicles, and reducing waste.

Political opponents of emissions regulations have argued that such measures reduce economic activity in the fossil fuel industry, a significant extractive industry in the United States, and increase costs for consumers, including drivers, electricity users, and building owners. Some have also argued that stringent environmental regulations may impose unnecessary constraints on individual economic choices. Supporters of emissions regulations contend that the economic benefits of reducing greenhouse gas emissions, including avoided climate damages and public health improvements, outweigh the associated compliance costs, and that government intervention is necessary because market forces alone have not adequately addressed climate change. Several states have implemented policies to encourage employment in renewable energy industries, while coal-producing regions have experienced economic challenges associated with declining coal demand, increased competition from inexpensive natural gas, and environmental regulations affecting coal-fired electricity generation.

In 2021 phase 4 of the Keystone XL pipeline, considered a symbol of the battle over climate change and fossil fuels, was cancelled, following strong objections from environmentalists, indigenous peoples, The Democratic Party, and the Joe Biden administration. The current U.S. Special Presidential Envoy for Climate is John Kerry.

The Inflation Reduction Act of 2022 is the largest investment in climate change mitigation in US history, with $369 billion allocated towards energy and climate initiatives.

==== State and regional policy ====
Across the country, regional organizations, states, and cities are achieving real emissions reductions and gaining valuable policy experience as they take action on climate change. According to the report of America's Pledge, 65% of the American population, 51% of the GHG emissions and 68% of the GDP, are now part of different coalitions that support climate action and want to fulfill the commitments of the US in the Paris Agreement. The coalitions include We Are Still In, US Climate Alliance, Climate Mayors and more.

These actions include increasing renewable energy generation, selling agricultural carbon sequestration credits, and encouraging efficient energy use. The U.S. Climate Change Science Program is a joint program of over twenty U.S. cabinet departments and federal agencies, all working together to investigate climate change. In June 2008, a report issued by the program stated that weather would become more extreme, due to climate change. States and municipalities often function as "policy laboratories", developing initiatives that serve as models for federal action. This has been especially true with environmental regulation—most federal environmental laws have been based on state models. In addition, state actions can significantly affect emissions, because many individual states emit high levels of greenhouse gases. Texas, for example, emits more than France, while California's emissions exceed those of Brazil. State actions are also important because states have primary jurisdiction over many areas—such as electric generation, agriculture, and land use—that are critical to addressing climate change.

Many states are participating in regional climate change initiatives, such as the Regional Greenhouse Gas Initiative in the northeastern United States, the Western Governors' Association (WGA) Clean and Diversified Energy Initiative, and the Southwest Climate Change Initiative.

Inside the ten northeastern states implementing the Regional Greenhouse Gas Initiative, carbon dioxide emissions per capita decreased by about 25% from 2000 and 2010, as the state economies continued to grow while enacting various energy efficiency programs.

In May 2023, Republican lawmakers in Montana passed a law—possibly the nation's most aggressive anti-climate action law—prohibiting state agencies from considering climate change impacts when considering permits for projects like coal mines and power plants. Tennessee and Louisiana had already passed laws requiring colleges to teach "both sides" of the debate over whether human-made climate change is real.

==== Legal actions ====
In April 2010, Virginia's Republican Attorney General Ken Cuccinelli claimed that climate scientist Michael E. Mann had possibly violated state fraud laws, and without providing evidence of wrongdoing, filed the Attorney General of Virginia's climate science investigation. The case involved extensive demands for document production, and was seen as an assault on academic freedom. After two years of litigation, the Virginia Supreme Court ruled in March 2012 that Cuccinelli did not have the authority to demand such records, and dismissed the action.

Held v. Montana was the first constitutional law climate lawsuit to go to trial in the United States, on June 12, 2023. The case was filed in March 2020 by sixteen youth residents of Montana, then aged 2 through 18, who argued that the state's support of the fossil fuel industry had worsened the effects of climate change on their lives, thus denying their right to a "clean and healthful environment in Montana for present and future generations"^{:Art. IX, § 1} as required by the Constitution of Montana. On August 14, 2023, the trial court judge ruled in the youth plaintiffs' favor, though the state indicated it would appeal the decision. Montana's Supreme Court heard oral arguments on July 10, 2024, its seven justices taking the case under advisement. On December 18, 2024, the Montana Supreme Court upheld the county court ruling.

In June 2023, Multnomah County, Oregon filed a lawsuit against seven defendants, including Exxon Mobil, Shell, Chevron and the Western States Petroleum Association, for materially contributing to the 2021 heat wave in the Pacific Northwest, which is thought to have killed hundreds of people. According to the Center for Climate Integrity, the Multnomah County lawsuit is the 36th action filed against fossil fuel interests for worsening the effects of climate change.

=== International cooperation ===
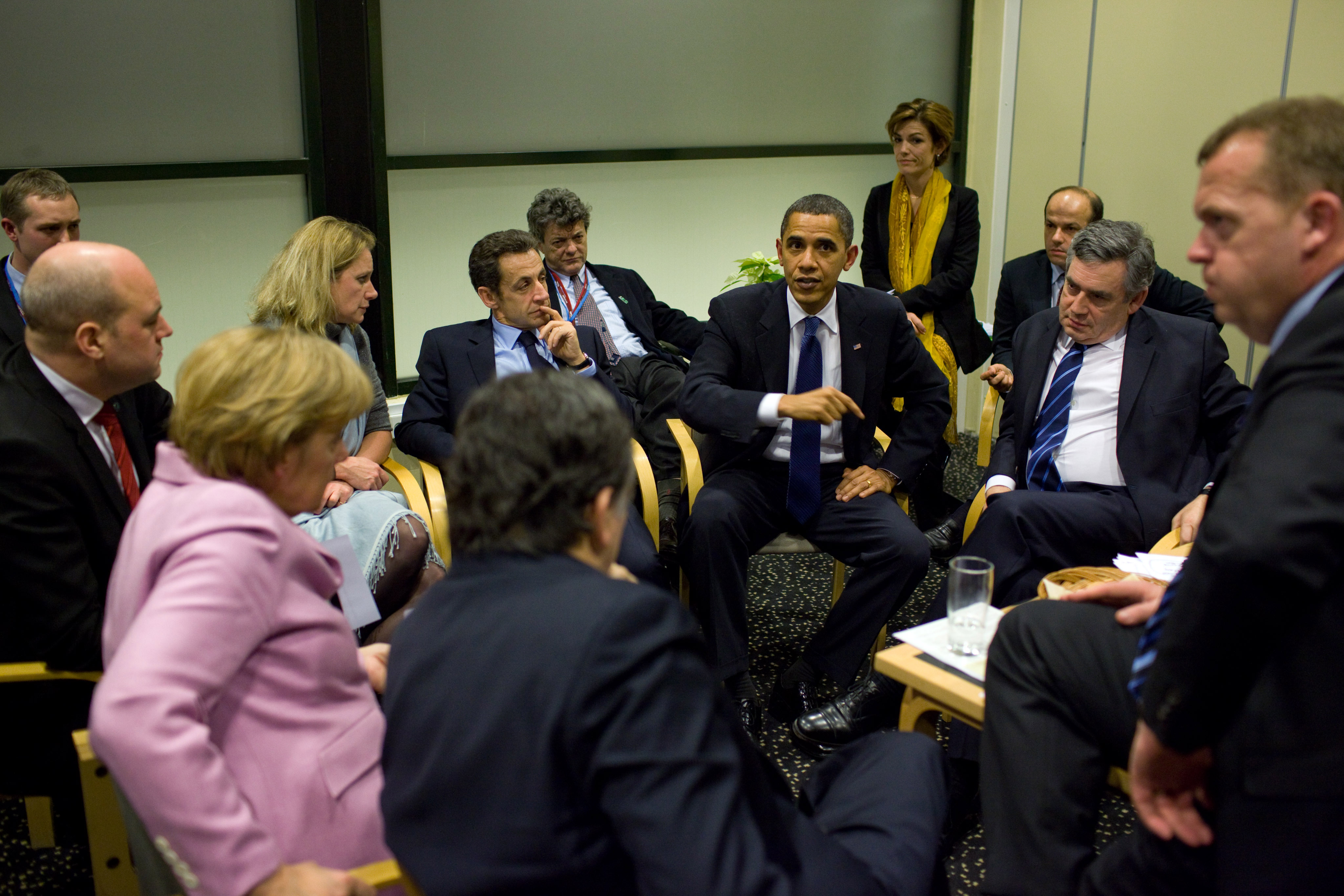
US president Barack Obama briefs several European leaders during the 2009 United Nations Climate Change Conference.

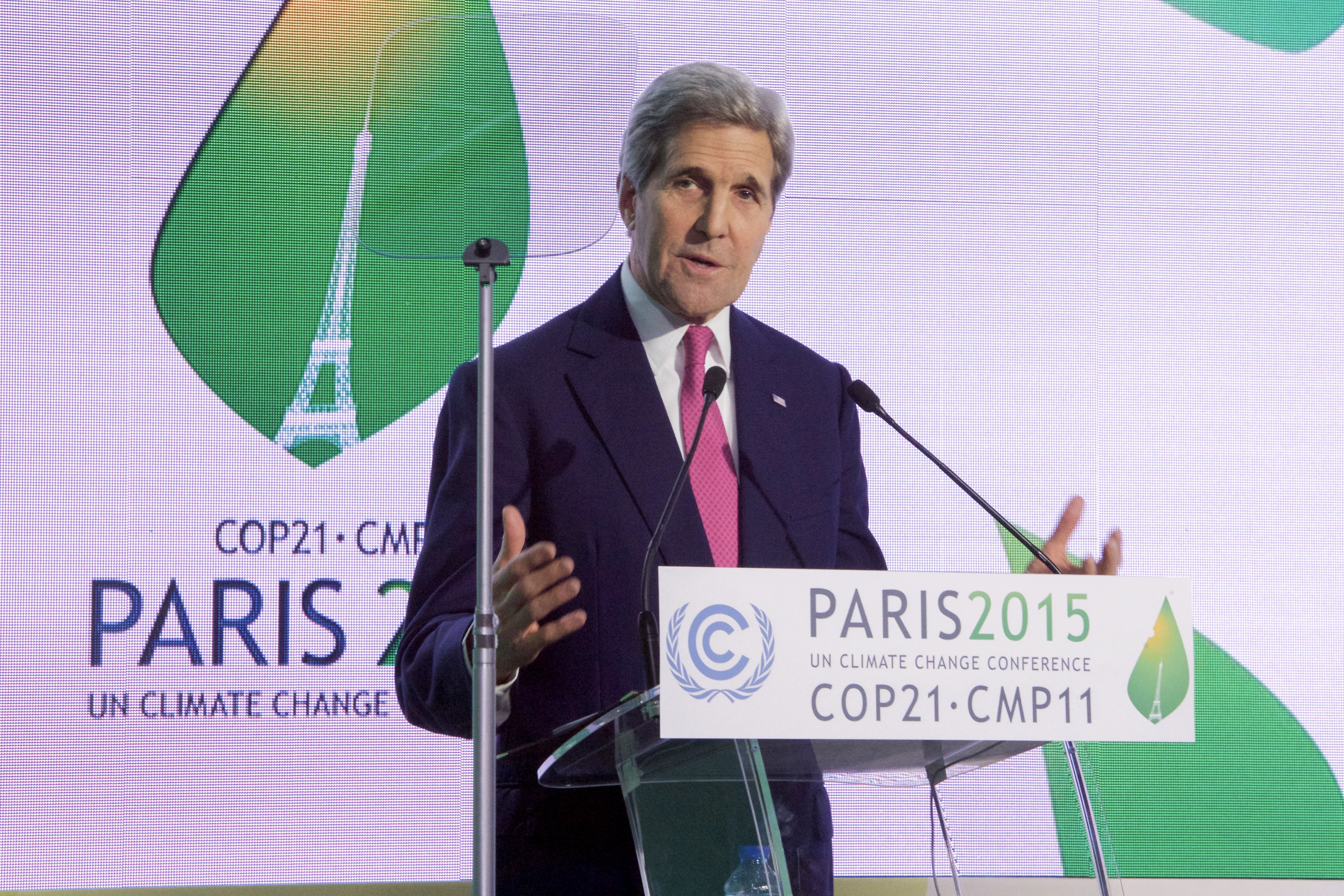
US Secretary of State John Kerry speaking at the 2015 United Nations Climate Change Conference.

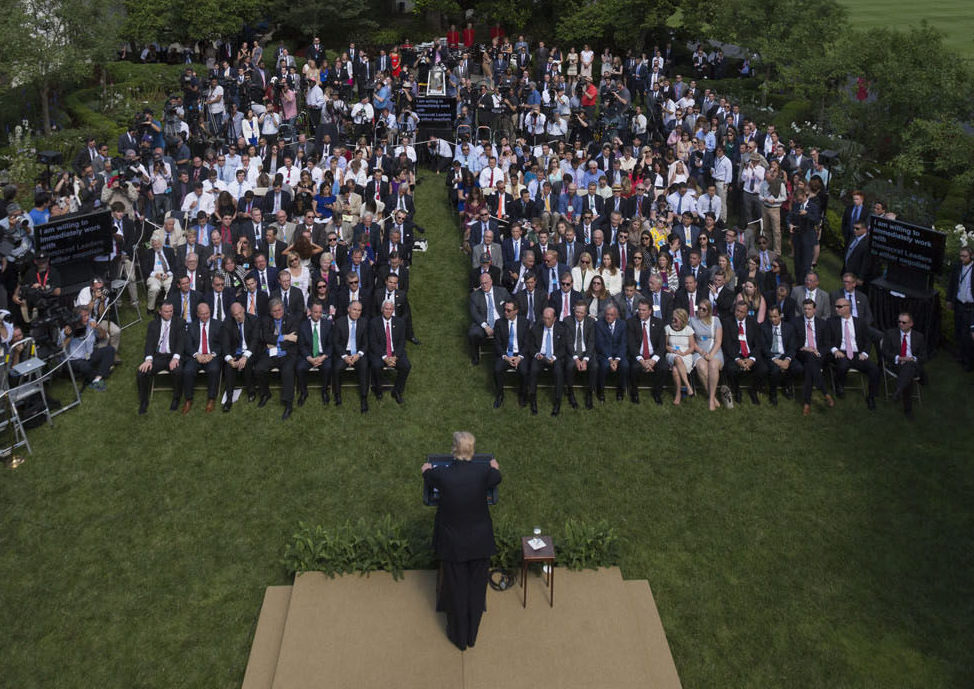
President Donald Trump announcing U.S. withdrawal from the Paris Agreement in 2017.

President Joe Biden signing his first executive order re-joining the Paris Agreement in 2021.

The United States, although a signatory to the 1997 Kyoto Protocol, under President Clinton, neither ratified nor withdrew from the protocol. In 1997, the U.S. Senate voted unanimously under the Byrd–Hagel Resolution that it was not the sense of the senate that the United States should be a signatory to the Kyoto Protocol, and in March 2001, the Bush Administration announced that it would not implement the treaty, saying it would create economic setbacks in the U.S. and does not put enough pressure to limit emissions from developing nations. In February 2002, Bush announced his alternative to the Kyoto Protocol, by bringing forth a plan to reduce the intensity of greenhouse gasses by 18 percent over 10 years. The intensity of greenhouse gasses specifically is the ratio of greenhouse gas emissions and economic output, meaning that under this plan, emissions would still continue to grow, but at a slower pace. Bush stated that this plan would prevent the release of 500 million metric tons of greenhouse gases, which is about the equivalent of 70 million cars from the road. This target would achieve this goal by providing tax credits to businesses that use renewable energy sources.

In 2007, the U.S. Supreme Court ruled in the case Massachusetts v. Environmental Protection Agency that EPA regulation of carbon dioxide is required under the Clean Air Act.

President Barack Obama proposed a cap-and-trade program as part of the 2010 United States federal budget, but this was never adopted by Congress.

President Obama committed in the December 2009 Copenhagen Climate Change Summit to reduce carbon dioxide emissions in the range of 17% below 2005 levels by 2020, 42% below 2005 levels by 2030, and 83% below 2005 levels by 2050. Data from an April 2013 report by the Energy Information Administration (EIA), showed a 12% reduction in the 2005 to 2012 period. Just over half of this decrease has been attributed to the recession, and the rest to a variety of factors such as replacing coal-based power generation with natural gas and increasing energy efficiency of American vehicles (according to a Council of Economic Advisors analysis).

In an address to the U.S. Congress in June 2013, the President detailed a specific action plan to achieve the 17% carbon emissions cut from 2005 by 2020, including measures such as shifting from coal-based power generation to solar and natural gas production. Some Republican and Democratic lawmakers expressed concern at the idea of imposing new fines and regulations on the coal industry while the U.S. still tries to recover from the world economic recession, with Speaker of the House John Boehner saying that the proposed rules "will put thousands and thousands of Americans out of work". Christiana Figueres, executive director of the UN's climate secretariat, praised the plan as providing a vital benchmark that people concerned with climate change can use as a paragon both at home and abroad.

After not participating in previous climate international treaties, the United States signed the Paris Agreement on April 22, 2016, during the Obama administration. Though this agreement does not mandate a specific reduction for any given country, it sets global goals, asks countries to set their own goals, and mandates reporting. United States international leadership was considered crucial in the negotiation during the 2015 United Nations Climate Change Conference and successful adoption of the international treaty.

The U.S. submitted its action plan in March 2015, ahead of the treaty signing. Reaffirming the November 2014 announcement it made with China, the United States declared it would reduce greenhouse gas emissions to 26–28% below 2005 levels by 2025. This is to be accomplished by several executive actions:

- Clean Power Plan - regulating sources of electricity (put on hold by the Supreme Court in February, 2016, pending the outcome of a lawsuit)
- New emission standards for heavy-duty vehicles, finalized by EPA in March, 2016
- Department of Energy efficiency standards for commercial buildings, appliances, and equipment
- Various actions to reduce emissions of greenhouse gases other than carbon dioxide, including regulation and voluntary efforts related to methane from landfills, agriculture, coal mines; and hydrofluorocarbons (HFCs) reduction through domestic regulation and amendment of the Montreal Protocol

In June 2017, President Donald Trump announced United States withdrawal from the Paris Agreement, although the exit process specified by the treaty (which Trump said the U.S. would follow) will last until at least November 4, 2020. Trump states that dropping out the agreement will create more job opportunities in the United States, but it may actually have the opposite effect by stifling the renewable energy industries. At the same time, Trump administration shut down the United States Environmental Protection Agency's climate change web pages and removed mentions of the topic elsewhere on the site. In April 2018, the Trump administration cancelled NASA's Carbon Monitoring System (CMS) program, which helped with the monitoring of CO_{2} emissions and deforestation in the United States and in other countries. The Trump administration also moved to increase fossil fuel consumption and roll back environmental policies that are considered to be burdensome to businesses.

For offsetting the dismantlement of the Clean Power Plan approximately 10 billion trees would need to be planted. Activists try to plant this number of trees.

In January 2020 Trump announced that the USA would join the Trillion Tree Campaign. Climate activists critiqued the plan for ignoring the root causes of climate change. House Natural Resources Committee Chairman Raul Grijalva critiqued the plan as "a feel-good participatory gesture" without a broader portfolio of environmental actions surrounding it.

In 2019, Democrats proposed a plan for climate action in USA aiming to not sell greenhouse gas emitting cars by 2035, reach zero emissions from the energy sector by 2040 and reduce to zero all the greenhouse gas emission of the country by 2050. The plan includes some actions to improve environmental justice. In 2016, 38% of adults in United States thought that stopping climate change are a top priority which rose to 52% in 2020. Many Republicans share this opinion. In November 2020 the Federal Reserve asked to join the Network for Greening the Financial System and included Climate Change in the list of risks to the economy. On November 2, Wired published an article about Trump administration efforts to distort and suppress information about climate change by firing the acting chief scientist of the National Oceanic and Atmospheric Administration and distorting the use of climate models at the United States Geological Survey.

On his first day as president, January 20, 2021, Joe Biden signed an executive order pledging that the US would rejoin the Paris Agreement. The US rejoined the agreement on February 19, 2021. This means that countries responsible for two thirds of global greenhouse gas emissions have pledged to become carbon neutral; without the US, it had been half.

== Society and culture ==
=== Media coverage ===
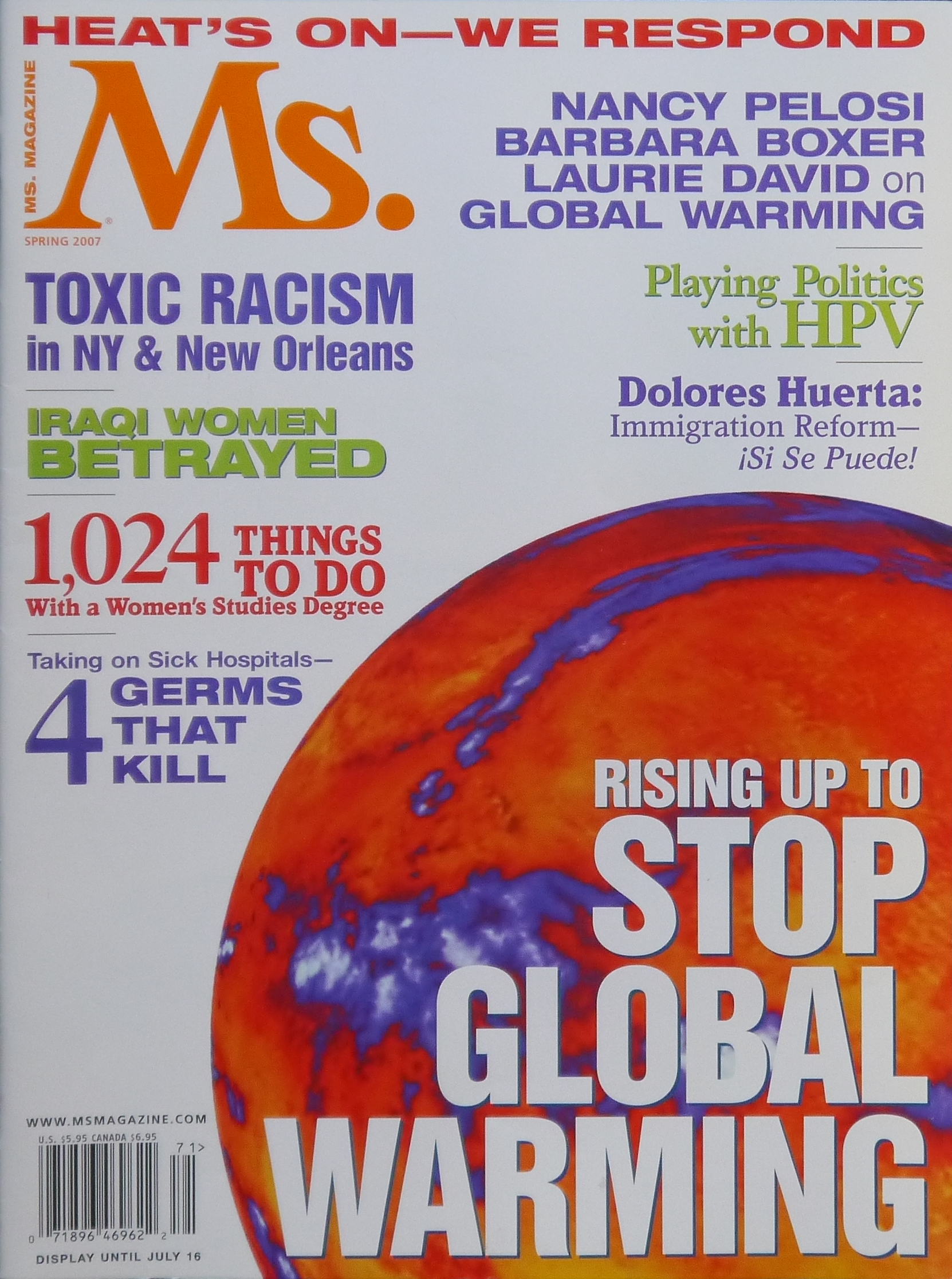
Cover of a 2007 magazine.

The way the media report on climate change in English-speaking countries, especially in the United States, has been widely studied, while studies of reporting in other countries have been less expansive. A number of studies have shown that particularly in the United States and in the UK tabloid press, the media significantly understated the strength of scientific consensus on climate change established in IPCC Assessment Reports in 1995 and in 2001.

One of the first critical studies of media coverage of climate change in the United States appeared in 1999. The author summarized her research:

Following a review of the decisive role of the media in American politics and of a few earlier studies of media bias, this paper examines media coverage of the greenhouse effect. It does so by comparing two pictures. The first picture emerges from reading all 100 greenhouse-related articles published over a five-month period (May–September 1997) in The Christian Science Monitor, New York Times, The San Francisco Chronicle, and The Washington Post. The second picture emerges from the mainstream scientific literature. This comparison shows that media coverage of environmental issues suffers from both shallowness and pro-corporate bias.

According to Peter J. Jacques et al., the mainstream news media of the United States is an example of the effectiveness of environmental skepticism as a tactic. A 2005 study reviewed and analyzed the US mass-media coverage of the environmental issue of climate change from 1988 to 2004. The authors confirm that within the journalism industry there is great emphasis on eliminating the presence of media bias. In their study they found that — due to this practice of journalistic objectivity — "Over a 15-year period, a majority (52.7%) of prestige-press articles featured balanced accounts that gave 'roughly equal attention' to the views that humans were contributing to global warming and that exclusively natural fluctuations could explain the earth's temperature increase [...] US mass-media have misrepresented the top climate scientific perspective regarding anthropogenic climate change." As a result, they observed that it is unsurprising for the public to believe that the issue of global warming and the accompanying scientific evidence is still hotly debated.

A study of US newspapers and television news from 1995 to 2006 examined "how and why US media have represented conflict and contentions, despite an emergent consensus view regarding anthropogenic climate science." The IPCC Assessment Reports in 1995 and in 2001 established an increasingly strong scientific consensus, yet the media continued to present the science as contentious. The study noted the influence of Michael Crichton's 2004 novel State of Fear, which "empowered movements across scale, from individual perceptions to the perspectives of US federal powerbrokers regarding human contribution to climate change."

A 2010 study concluded that "Mass media in the U.S. continue to suggest that scientific consensus estimates of global climate disruption, such as those from the Intergovernmental Panel on Climate Change (IPCC), are 'exaggerated' and overly pessimistic. By contrast, work on the Asymmetry of Scientific Challenge (ASC) suggests that such consensus assessments are likely to understate climate disruptions [...] new scientific findings were more than twenty times as likely to support the ASC perspective than the usual framing of the issue in the U.S. mass media. The findings indicate that supposed challenges to the scientific consensus on global warming need to be subjected to greater scrutiny, as well as showing that, if reporters wish to discuss "both sides" of the climate issue, the scientifically legitimate 'other side' is that, if anything, global climate disruption may prove to be significantly worse than has been suggested in scientific consensus estimates to date."

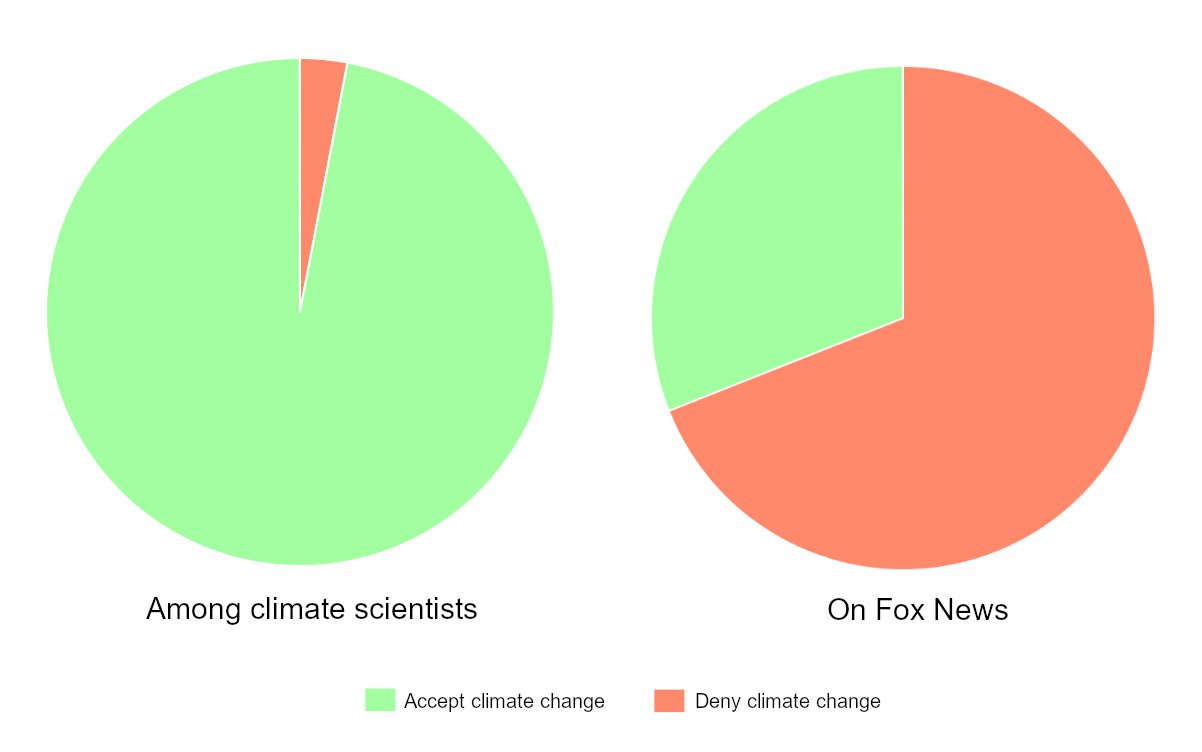
Scientific consensus on climate change (left) versus attitudes of Fox News guests in 2013 (right)

The most watched news network in the United States, Fox News, most of the time promotes climate misinformation and employs tactics that distract from the urgency of global climate change, according to a 2019 study by Public Citizen. According to the study, 86% of Fox News segments that discussed the topic were "dismissive of the climate crisis, cast its consequences in doubt or employed fear mongering when discussing climate solutions". These segments presented global climate change as a political construct, rarely, if ever, discussing the threat posed by climate change or the vast body of scientific evidence for its existence. Consistent with such politicized framing, three messages were most commonly advanced in these segments: global climate change is part of a "big government" agenda of the Democratic Party (34% of segments); an effective response to the climate crisis would destroy the economy and hurtle us back to the Stone Age (26% of segments); and, concern about the climate crisis is "alarmists", "hysterical", the shrill voice of a "doomsday climate cult", or the like (12% of segments). Such segments often featured "experts" who are not climate scientists at all or are personally connected to vested interests, such as the energy industry and its network of lobbyists and think tanks, for example, the Heartland Institute, funded by the ExxonMobil company and the Koch foundation. The remaining segments (14%) were neutral on the subject or presented information without editorializing.

It has been suggested that the association of climate change with the Arctic in popular media may undermine effective communication of the scientific realities of anthropogenic climate change. The close association of images of Arctic glaciers, ice, and fauna with climate change might harbor cultural connotations that contradict the fragility of the region. For example, in cultural-historical narratives, the Arctic was depicted as an unconquerable, foreboding environment for explorers; in climate change discourse, the same environment is sought to be understood as fragile and easily affected by humanity.

Gallup's annual update on Americans' attitudes toward the environment shows a public that over the last two years (2008-2010) has become less worried about the threat of global warming, less convinced that its effects are already happening, and more likely to believe that scientist themselves are uncertain about its occurrence. In response to one key question, 48% of Americans now believe that the seriousness of global warming is generally exaggerated, up from 41% in 2009 and 31% in 1997, when Gallup first asked the question.

Data from the Media Matters for America organization has shown that, despite 2015 being "a year marked by more landmark actions to address climate change than ever before", the combined climate coverage on the top broadcast networks was down by 5% from 2014.

President Donald Trump denies the threat of global warming publicly. As a result of the Trump Presidency, media coverage on climate change was expected to decline during his term as president.

Globally, media coverage of global warming and climate change decreased in 2020. In the United States, however, newspaper coverage of climate change increased 29% between March 2020 and April 2020, these numbers are still 22% down from coverage in January 2020. This spike in April 2020 can be attributed to the increased coverage of the "Covering Climate Now'' campaign and the US holiday of "Earth Day". The overall decline in climate change coverage in the year 2020 is related to the increased coverage and interconnectedness of COVID-19 and President Trump, without mention of climate change, that began in January 2020.

The U.S. experienced its highest level of climate change media coverage to date in September and October 2021. This increase can be attributed to coverage of the United Nations Conference of Parties meeting which aimed to outline policies to address climate change. According to the analysis of Media Matters for America, in 2024 the corporate broadcast networks in the USA dedicated to climate change 12 hours and 51 minutes, which is considered as highly insufficient. Climate coverage declined in the years 2022–2024.

Media coverage of the January 2025 Southern California wildfires has been criticized for not addressing the impact of climate change on the fires, with some coverage ignoring the climate crisis altogether.

=== Public opinion about climate change ===
Surveys of US adults re global warming show slowly growing agreements that global warming is occurring and is mostly human-caused. By 2025, over 70% of surveyed US adults agreed that global warming is happening, and almost 60% agree that it is mostly human-caused.

Research found that 80–90% of Americans underestimate the prevalence of support for major climate change mitigation policies and climate concern among fellow Americans. While 66–80% Americans support these policies, Americans estimate the prevalence to be 37–43%. Researchers have called this misperception a false social reality, a form of pluralistic ignorance.

Americans are among those who least believe that climate change is a major threat to their country, ranking climate change lowest of five threats in this Pew survey.

In a UNDP survey covering 77 countries, most respondents from top fossil fuel-producing countries favored a quick transition away from fossil fuels, with 54% of US respondents agreeing.

A survey taken by the Public Religion Research Institute (PRRI) in 2023 found that the majority of respondents (61%) believed that climate change was mostly being caused by human activates while 28% said it was being caused by natural patterns in the Earth's environment and 10% said there "was no solid evidence that climate change is happening".

In August 2022, Nature Communications published a survey with 6,119 representatively sampled Americans that found that 66 to 80% of Americans supported major climate change mitigation policies (i.e. 100% renewable energy by 2035, Green New Deal, carbon tax and dividend, renewable energy production siting on public land) and expressed climate concern, but that 80 to 90% of Americans underestimated the prevalence of support for such policies and such concern by their fellow Americans (with the sample estimating that only 37 to 43% on average supported such policies). Americans in every state and every assessed demographic (e.g. political ideology, racial group, urban/suburban/rural residence, educational attainment) underestimated support across all policies tested, and every state survey group and every demographic assessed underestimated support for the climate policies by at least 20 percentage points. The researchers attributed the misperception among the general public to pluralistic ignorance. Conservatives were found to underestimate support for the policies due to a false consensus effect, exposure to more conservative local norms, and consumption of conservative news, while liberals were suggested to underestimate support for the policies due to a false-uniqueness effect.

In the exit polls for the 2020 U.S. presidential election, 67 percent of voters surveyed agreed that climate change is a serious problem, while 71 percent of voters surveyed in the exit polls for the 2022 U.S. House of Representatives elections agreed that climate change is a "very serious" or "somewhat serious" problem.

In July 2024, Resources for the Future and the Political Psychology Research Group of Stanford University released the 2024 edition of a joint survey of 1,000 U.S. adults that found that while 77% believed that global warming would hurt future generations at least a moderate amount, only 55% believed that global warming would hurt them personally–which was lower than the peak response to the question in the survey series in 2010 when 63% of survey respondents believed that global warming would hurt them personally.

One April 2012 Stanford Social Innovation Review article said that public opinion in the United States varies intensely enough to be considered a culture war.

In a January 2013 survey, Pew found that 69% of Americans say there is solid evidence that the Earth's average temperature has gotten warmer over the past few decades, up six points since November 2011 and 12 points since 2009.

A Gallup poll in 2014 concluded that 51% of Americans were a little or not at all worried about climate change, 24% a great deal and 25% were worried a fair amount.

A 2016 Gallup poll found that 64% of Americans were worried about global warming, that 59% believed that global warming was already happening, and 65% were convinced that global warming was caused by human activities. These numbers show that awareness of global warming was increasing in the United States.

A Gallup poll showed that 62% of Americans believe that the effects of global warming were happening in 2017.

In 2019, Gallup poll found that one-third of Americans blame unusual winter temperatures on climate change.

==== Grouping into six categories ====
The Yale Program on Climate Change Communication has studied the public opinion about climate change in the US, and how it changes with time. Since 2007 and continuing into 2021, Yale University researchers have been analysing public opinion on climate change using a six-group framework, called the Six Americas, to describe and quantify positions people hold in terms of "levels of engagement and concern and awareness" of an issue.

They have divided the population of the USA into six categories:

- Alarmed: people who think that climate change happens, it is man made, and an urgent threat.
- Concerned: people who think climate change exists, it is man made, and it is a serious problem.
- Cautious: people that have heard about climate change but are not sure what causes it and are "not very worried about it".
- Disengaged: people that do not know much about climate change.
- Doubtful: people who think that climate change probably does not exist or it is not man made, but are not sure. They consider climate change as "a low risk".
- Dismissive: people that think that man made climate change does not exist, and who mostly oppose climate measures.

According to the report on the 2017-2021 Climate Change in the American Mind survey, the percentages had changed—the "Alarmed" increasing to 24% of the population, the "Concerned" to 30%, "Cautious" remained the same at 19%, "Disengaged" decreased to 5%, the "Doubtful" increased to 15%, and the "Dismissive" increased to 10%.

In 2019, the Yale Program on Climate Change Communication found that 69% of Americans believe that climate change is happening. However, Americans underestimate the number of fellow Americans who believe that global warming is taking place. Americans estimated that only 54% of Americans believed that climate change is happening, when the number was much higher. Researchers have called this misperception a false social reality, a form of pluralistic ignorance.

A survey conducted in 2021 by the Yale Program on Climate Change Communication and the George Mason University Center for Climate Change Communication indicated that Americans are "alarmed" (33%), "concerned" (25%), "cautious" (17%), "disengaged" (5%), "doubtful" (10%), and "dismissive" (9%) about climate change. About 6 of 10 Americans are alarmed or concerned about climate change. Overall, the support for climate policy is growing. The "Alarmed" section has almost doubled. The Cautious, Doubtful, and Dismissive groups all shrank compared to the earlier years of the study.

Public opinion about climate change in the USA
Category	2009	2017	2021	2022
Alarmed	18%	18%	24%	33%
Concerned	33%	32%	30%	25%
Cautious	19%	22%	19%	17%
Disengaged	12%	5%	5%	5%
Doubtful	11%	12%	15%	10%
Dismissive	7%	11%	10%	9%

Previously, in 2015, the Yale Program on Climate Change Communication had reported that 32% of Americans were worried about global warming as a great deal. Those numbers rose to 37% in 2016, and 45% in 2017. A poll taken in 2016 shows that 52% of Americans believe climate change to be caused by human activity, while 34% state it is caused by natural changes.

In 2009, the same study team had reported the following results: People were alarmed (18%), concerned (33%), cautious (19%), disengaged (12%), doubtful (11%) or dismissive (7%). The alarmed and concerned make out the largest percentage and think something should be done about global warming. The cautious, disengaged and doubtful are less likely to take action. The dismissive are convinced global warming is not happening. These audiences can be used to define the best approaches for environmental action.

=== Political ideologies ===
Democrats and Republicans differ in views of the seriousness of addressing climate change, with the gap widening since the late 2010s mainly through Democrats' share increasing.

The sharp divide over the existence of and responsibility for global warming and climate change falls largely along political lines. Overall, 60% of Americans surveyed said oil and gas companies were "completely or mostly responsible" for climate change.

Opinion about human causation of climate change increased substantially with education among Democrats, but not among Republicans. Conversely, opinions favoring becoming carbon neutral declined substantially with age among Republicans, but not among Democrats.

Perceptions differ along political lines, on whether climate change was a "major factor" contributing to various extreme weather events experienced by respondents.

The U.S. political divide on the seriousness of climate change is more than about double that of all other countries surveyed, except Australia. Right-wing opinion in the U.S. was found to be more dismissive than any other country in this Pew survey.

Historical support for environmental protection has been relatively non-partisan. Republican Theodore Roosevelt established national parks whereas Democrat Franklin D. Roosevelt established the Soil Conservation Service.

A 1977 memo from President Carter's chief science adviser Frank Press warned of the possibility of catastrophic climate change caused by increasing carbon dioxide concentrations introduced into the atmosphere by fossil fuel consumption. However, other issues—such as known harms to health from pollutants, and avoiding energy dependence on other nations—seemed more pressing and immediate. Energy Secretary James Schlesinger advised that "the policy implications of this issue are still too uncertain to warrant Presidential involvement and policy initiatives", and the fossil fuel industry began sowing doubt about climate science.

Historical non-partisanship began to change during the 1980s when the Reagan administration stated that environmental protection was an economic burden. Views over global warming began to seriously diverge among Democrats and Republicans when ratifying the Kyoto Protocol was being debated in 1998. Gaps in opinions among the general public are often amplified among political figures, such as members of Congress, who tend to be more polarized. A 2017 study by the Center for American Progress Action Fund of climate change denial in the United States Congress found 180 members who deny the science behind climate change; all were Republicans.

On January 20, 2017, within moments of Donald Trump's inauguration as president, all references to climate change were removed from the White House website. The U.S. has been considered the most authoritative researcher of this information, and there was concern amongst the scientific community as to how the Trump administration would prioritize the issue. In early indications to news media of the first federal budget process under Donald Trump's administration, there were signs that most efforts under the Obama administration to curb U.S. greenhouse gas emissions would effectively be rolled back. In July 2018, the Trump Administration released its Draft Environmental Impact Statement from the NHTSA. In it was the prediction that on our current course the planet will warm a disastrous seven degrees Fahrenheit (or about 3.9 degrees Celsius) by the end of this century. Speaking to the California Secretary for Natural Resources during the 2020 California wildfires, Trump said of the changing climate, "It'll start getting cooler, you just watch". When the Secretary implied that the science disagreed, Trump responded, "I don't think science knows, actually".

Many pages were created to examine and compare the views of the candidates in the 2020 presidential election on climate change. The League of Conservation Voters create a special site, entirely dedicated to the issue called: "Change the Climate 2020". Similar pages were created in the site of NRDC, Ballotpedia, Boston CBS, the Skimm A study published in 2021, found that Republicans could be persuaded to change opinions about climate change with targeted advertising.

=== Activism ===
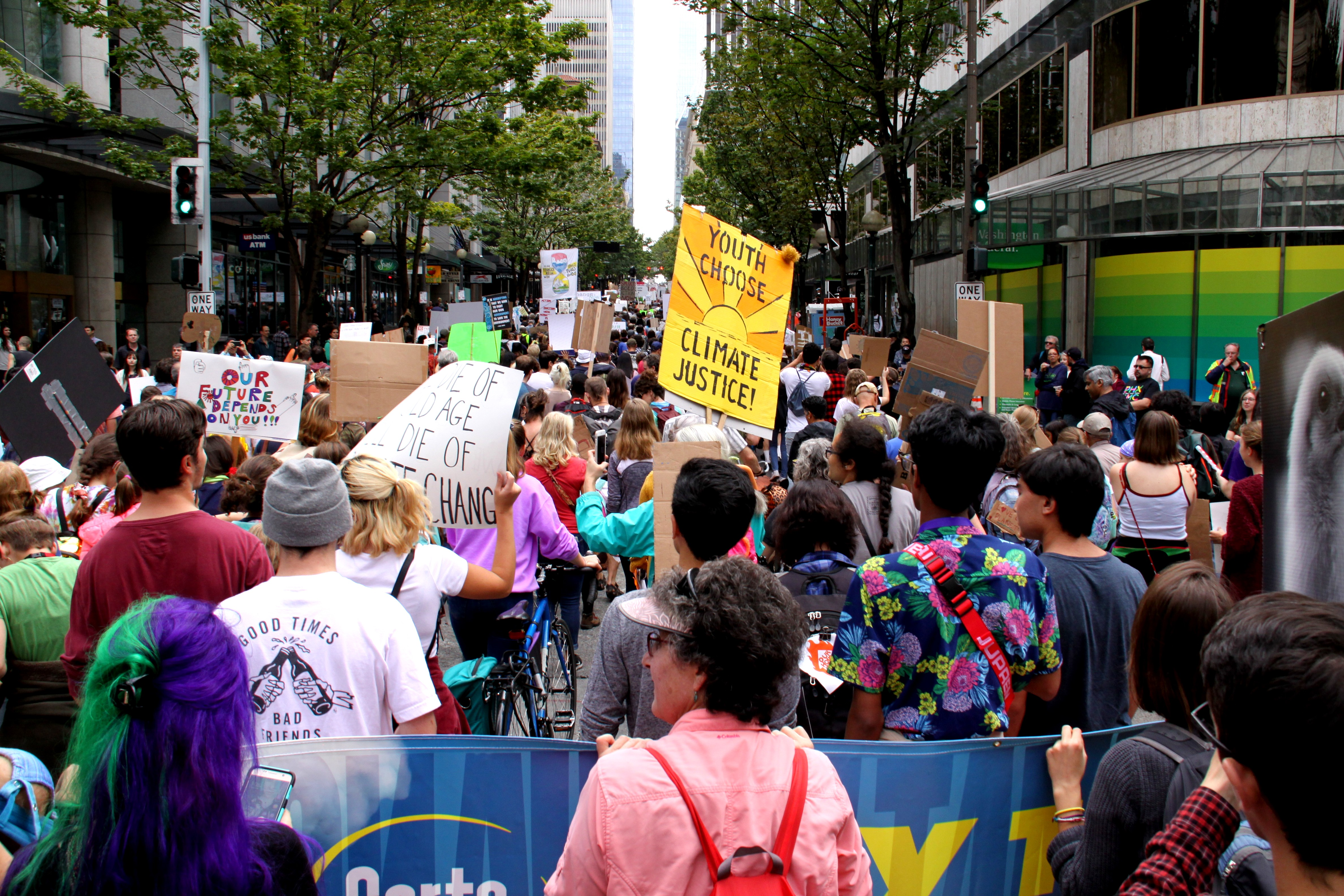
Protesters at the September 2019 climate strike in Seattle.

The climate movement and climate change protests have taken place in the United States. The 2014 People's Climate March attracted hundreds of thousands of demonstrators to New York. Some evangelical Christian groups have also partaken in climate change activism.

=== Research and educational institutions ===
NASA conducts, publishes and communicates research on climate change.

The University of Maine Climate Change Institute (founded 1973) has mapped the difference between climate during the Ice Age and during modern times, and found that the climate can change abruptly through analysis of Greenland ice cores.

In 2011, the University of California, Davis, incorporated 4.1 MW of solar panels in the student housing community of West Village effectively reaching 82% of net zero energy. The University of California, Irvine, added hydrogen fuel cell buses to their mircrogrid, which contain no tailpipe emissions of carbon, better fuel economy than diesel and natural gas buses and have a significant longer range than battery powered buses. The University of California, Merced, began the UC Solar initiative in which 9 out of the 10 US campuses installed 1-megawatt solar array where researchers are utilizing non-imaging optics to design thermal and photovoltaic solar concentrators.

=== Business community ===
In 2015, according to The New York Times and others, oil companies knew that burning oil and gas could cause global warming since the 1970s but, nonetheless, funded deniers for years. Likewise, scientists at General Motors and the Ford Motor Company knew as early as the 1960s that their products caused climate change and the companies did the same.

A review, published in 2016, of academic literature that explores the potential for greenhouse emissions related liability, calculated that climate change related liability could reach trillions of dollars based on lost revenue from nations that would forced to evacuate because of sea level rise.

== Climate change by state or territory ==
The impacts of climate change are different from state to state. Generally, states that emit more carbon dioxide per person and block climate action, are suffering more. To learn more about the climate change by state, see the following articles:

== See also ==
- Climate change and indigenous peoples
- Climate change and agriculture in the United States
- Environmental issues in the United States
- Hurricane Katrina and global warming
- List of U.S. states and territories by carbon dioxide emissions
- Major Economies Forum on Energy and Climate
- National Climate Assessment
- Regional Clean Air Incentives Market (RECLAIM, an emission trading scheme in California)
- U.S. Climate Change Science Program
- United States Climate Alliance
- Environmental racism
