= Regional Clean Air Incentives Market =

Emissions trading program operating in the state of California since 1994

Regional Clean Air Incentives Market (RECLAIM) is an emissions trading program operating in the state of California since 1994. Under the trading program, hundreds of polluting facilities are required to cut their emissions of nitrogen oxides (NOx) and sulfur oxides (SOx).

Under the system, which operates as a cap-and-trade program, each participating facility is given a certain number of emission rights (the 'cap') for free. In each consecutive year, the number of emission rights given is reduced such that the facilities have to either reduce their emissions or buy up emission rights from facilities with enough to trade.

The system was designed to reduce emissions of NOx by 70% from 1994 to 2003, and it was hoped to achieve this more cheaply than the traditional 'command and control' regulations it replaced. However, due to the setting of too generous caps, emissions were reduced at only a fraction of the rate expected at the time of the program's adoption. The US Environmental Protection Agency (EPA) considers RECLAIM a general lesson for market-based systems, namely that market-based programs require significant planning, preparation, and management during development and throughout the life of the program.

== Scope of the Program ==
As of 2004, The NOx trading program includes 311 participating facilities, and among these 33 also participate in the SOx trading program. The facilities include a large number of electric power stations, in addition to other types of installations.

== Environmental results ==
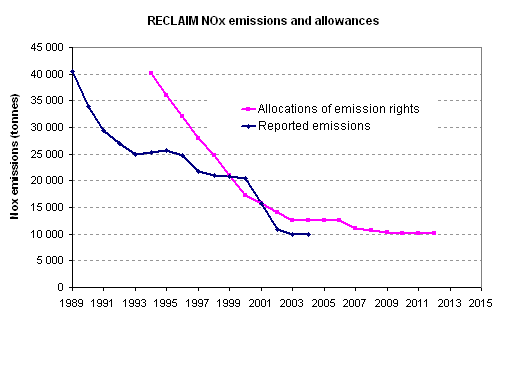
The blue line shows how much NOx emissions were actually reduced in the RECLAIM program, while the pink one shows how many emission rights were available. It is evident that from 1994 to 1999, there were so many emission rights granted that there was little need to reduce emissions. In 2000, the system actually failed and emissions were too high. As a result, in 2001 after the California electricity crisis the system was substantially modified and power facilities were ordered to install emission control technology, leading to a large reduction in emissions.

Emissions of NOx were reduced, albeit in the first many years more slowly than had been expected (see figure), and more slowly than under previous regulations. In its 2003 evaluation of RECLAIM, EPA concluded:

The initial allocations were excessively high and well beyond what was needed to account or allow for recovery from the "recessionary" economic conditions at the time RECLAIM was initiated. As indicated elsewhere, the initial allocations were roughly 40-60 percent above actual emissions during the first two years (1994-1995). EPA was unable to locate analyses justifying such a growth allowance based on economic data. Further, the data that has been provided in SCAQMD reports indicates that the Gross Regional Product has increased by approximately 13 percent since start of the program. This is not of sufficient magnitude to explain a rate of emissions decrease of less than half the initial projections.

== Economics ==
=== Costs ===
The program was founded on the principle that it would not only achieve the same environmental results as the traditional (successful) 'command and control' regulations, but that it would do so more cheaply. As EPA pointed out in its 2003 review of the program, it first of all failed to reduce emissions as much as otherwise, due to too generous emission caps, and even then much of the emissions reduced came at a price (per tonne) higher than would have been the case under the subsumed command-and-control program.

=== Allowance prices ===
The emission rights in RECLAIM are called RECLAIM Trading Credits (RTC), with one RTC for each tonne of NOx or SOx emissions. During 2005, NOx RTC average prices ranged from a low of $1,200 per ton for the Compliance Year 2004 RTCs, to $9,730 per ton for Compliance Year 2008 NOx RTCs, to $10,193 per ton of NOx RTCs for Compliance Years 2010, and leveled off at around $9,800 per ton for RTCs valid for Compliance Years 2010 and beyond. For SOx, average 2005 prices ranged from $1,400 per ton for Compliance Year 2004 SOx RTCs to around $4,450 per ton of SOx RTCs valid for Compliance Year 2007 and beyond.

== Footnotes ==
- SCAQMD, 2006
- EPA 2003
- SCAQMD, 2004
- Joskow, 2001a
- Joskow, 2001b
