= Criticism of the World Trade Organization =

Criticism directed at the World Trade Organization

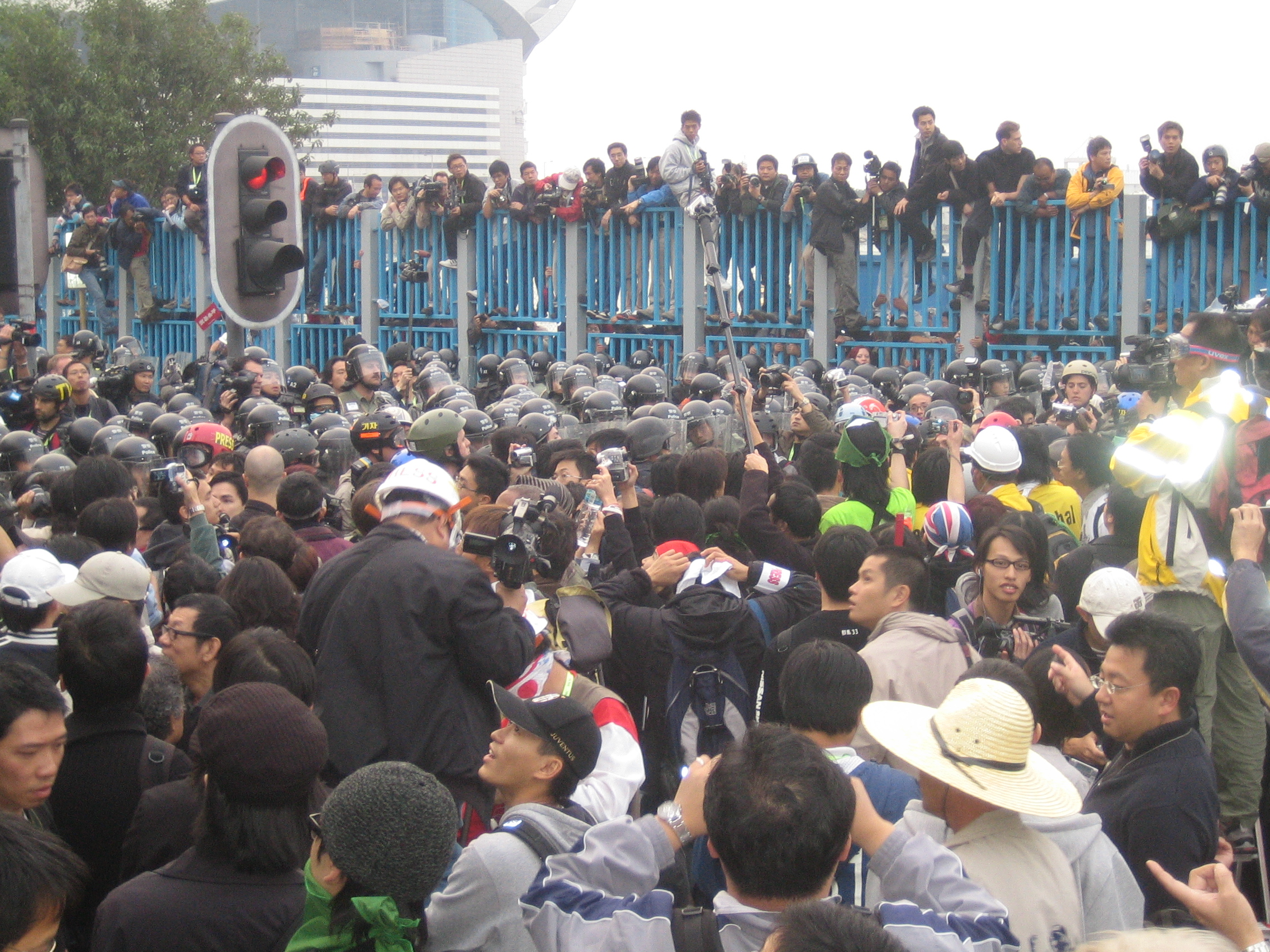
Protestors clash with Hong Kong police in the Wan Chai waterfront area during the WTO Ministerial Conference of 2005.

Since its creation in 1995, the World Trade Organization (WTO) has worked to maintain and develop international trade. As one of the largest international economic organizations (alongside the International Monetary Fund (IMF) and the World Bank), it has strong influence and control over trading rules and agreements, and thus has the ability to affect a country's economy immensely. The WTO policies aim to balance tariffs and other forms of economic protection with a trade liberalization policy, and to "ensure that trade flows as smoothly, predictably and freely as possible". Indeed, the WTO claims that its actions "cut living costs and raise standards, stimulate economic growth and development, help countries develop, [and] give the weak a stronger voice." Statistically speaking, global trade has consistently grown between one and six percent per annum over the past decade, and US$38.8 billion were allocated to Aid for Trade in 2016.

Yet several criticisms of the WTO have arisen over time from a range of fields, including economists such as Dani Rodrik and Ha Joon Chang, and anthropologists such as Marc Edelman, who have argued that the institution "only serves the interests of multinational corporations, undermines local development, penalizes poor countries, [and] is increasing inequality", and have argued that some agreements about agriculture and pharmaceutical goods have led to restricted access to food and healthcare, thus causing large numbers of deaths. Several factors are alleged to contribute to these conditions, including but not limited to: the most favoured nation rule (MFN), national treatment policies, and failure to regard the infant industry argument. Critics argue that the policies that support these principles fail to protect developing nations, and in some cases take advantage of them. For example, UNCTAD estimates that market distortions cost developing countries $700 billion annually in lost export revenue.

== Martin Khor ==
Martin Khor argues that the WTO does not manage the global economy impartially, but in its operation has a systematic bias toward rich countries and multinational corporations, harming smaller countries that have less negotiation power. Some suggested examples of this bias are:

- Rich countries are able to maintain high import duties and quotas in certain products, blocking imports from developing countries (e.g., clothing);
- According to statements made at United Nations Conference on Trade and Development (UNCTAD, 2005), the use of NTBs (non-tariff barriers), based on the amount and control of price levels has decreased significantly from 45% in 1994 to 15% in 2004, while use of other NTBs increased from 55% in 1994 to 85% in 2004, such as anti-dumping measures allowed against developing countries;
- The maintenance of high protection of agriculture in developed countries, while developing ones are pressed to open their markets;
- Many developing countries do not have the capacity to follow the negotiations and participate actively in the Doha Round; and
- The Agreement on Trade-Related Aspects of Intellectual Property Rights (TRIPs) agreement, which limits developing countries from utilizing some technology that originates from abroad in their local systems (including medicines and agricultural products).

Khor argues that developing countries have not benefited from the WTO Agreements of the Uruguay Round and, therefore, the credibility of the WTO trade system could be eroded. According to Khor, "one of the major categories of 'problems of implementation of the Uruguay Round' is the way the Northern countries have not lived up to the spirit of their commitments in implementing (or not implementing) their obligations agreed to in the various Agreements." Khor also believes that the Doha Round negotiations "have veered from their proclaimed direction oriented to a development-friendly outcome, towards a 'market access' direction in which developing countries are pressured to open up their agricultural, industrial and services sectors." Jagdish Bhagwati asserts, however, that there is greater tariff protection on manufacturers in the poor countries, which are also overtaking the rich nations in the number of anti-dumping filings.

== Agriculture ==
Agriculture has been one of the central issues that the WTO has attempted to tackle over the course of more than two decades, and it provides a critical window into criticisms surrounding the organization. As an increasingly globalized and multilateral market sector, agriculture has become implicated in various issues, including trade, phytosanitary measures, intellectual property rights, animal and human health, environmental policy, human rights, biotechnology, gender equity, and food sovereignty. Therefore, analyzing the effects of the WTO on agriculture inevitably links it to other sectors and sheds light on general criticisms against the organization.

=== Historical background ===
The WTO's foray into the agricultural sector began with the breakdown of Bretton Woods policies. The WTO's predecessor, the General Agreement on Tariffs and Trade (GATT)—itself a Bretton Woods institution—had explicitly excluded agriculture during its establishment in 1947. As a result, additions to the Agreement regarding the agricultural sector during this time were both limited in scope and had no agreed-upon methods of enforcement. However, the tides turned with the 1980s farm crisis, wherein the US produced a high surplus of grain, leading to plummeting land and commodity prices, soaring interest rates, and an increase in defaulted loans. This put agriculture in the spotlight of international trade diplomacy, and GATT began the Uruguay Round in 1986 with the focus of “developing a powerful institutional framework…to regulate the rules of [multilateral] trade for world agriculture.” At the conclusion of the rounds in 1993, GATT dissolved in favor of the newly formed World Trade Organization, which was to expand into other sectors such as agriculture and “cover trade in services and intellectual property” as well as the scope of goods previously managed under GATT.

==== Agreement on Agriculture ====
In order to join the WTO, there are several requirements, or mandates, that a country must fulfill. The Agreement on Agriculture (AoA) is one of the mandates that was established at the inception of the organization. At its core, the document sets “a series of ceiling and timetables that circumscribe[s] the extent to which signatory governments could provide protective assistance to agriculture.” First, there is an argument about the weakening of national sovereignty: in dictating the budgets to agriculture within each nation (as opposed to between nations), this began a series of “internationally-binding set of rules that would progressively eliminate nations’ capacities to subsidise their rural economies,” and also created a system in which when national governments join the WTO, they “relinquish their ability to set their own food and agricultural policies.” Critics also argue that in dictating limits on how much countries protect their agricultural sector, the organization leaves farmers—especially peasant farmers, who make up a significant portion of the population in many developing countries—vulnerable to food insecurity, and thus breaking international law about food as a human right.

=== Economic effects ===
Since its inception, the WTO has imposed policies that have encouraged the growth of neoliberalism and aggravated the divide between the Global South and North. For example, its protectionist policies consistently seem to favor the Global North, with OECD countries providing its farmers with “support equivalent to 40.43% of the value of farm gate production” in 1986–88. Although this level of support makes sense given the farm crisis of the 1980s, the figure was still at a staggering 40.07% in 1999. In addition, in the US alone, “about 50% of total producer revenue for US milk, sugar and rice is attributable to farm programmes.” Meanwhile, agriculture in the Global South and poverty has been increasingly linked with one another, with national poverty rates correlated with the number of agriculture-specialized households. This is because the neoliberal reforms demanded by the WTO have destroyed guaranteed prices and state-sponsored extension services, and governments of the Global South have had to dismantle programs for food security and rural assistance in favor of those that would help them meet WTO mandates, often at “significant political costs.” For example, since its joining the WTO, Mexico has been enforcing “repeasantization” programs, which has two parts: first, to promote urbanization, thus breaking down the rural population into smaller and even more rural communities, and second, to encourage “growth and development” in the agricultural sector. These development methods include pressures for farmers to use certain pesticides and fertilizers; graft fruit trees; and grow produce that is too expensive for they themselves to consume. This has led to the “disintegration of peasant household enterprises…[and the destruction of] subsistence security.”

Conversely, research conducted by united efforts from the Centre for Economic Policy Research, Center for Economic Studies, CESifo Group, and the Maison des Sciences de l’Homme shows that the significant impact of potential WTO policies, both protectionist and liberal, would assuage the widening gap between developed and developing countries. In developed countries, agriculture tends to have relatively low impact on the economy; only 8% of the total income of US farm households comes from the farm, with the numbers increasing to 10% in Canada and 12% in Japan. However, most peasant communities of the global South depend primarily on agriculture for the main source of household income; as a result, while trade reforms would lead to “serious losses…to large, wealthy farmers in a few heavily protected sub-sectors” in the US, the aforementioned research groups estimate that poverty reduction could be in the double digits and “could lift large numbers of developing country farm households out of poverty.”

Given the large structural changes the WTO has wrought with mandates like the AoA, it is clear that it “could certainly reform the privileges of the richest farmers of the North for the sake of the poor farmers in the South.” This could be done by “push[ing] for more poor country farm and food tariff cuts, as these products loom large in the household budgets of the poor [and] giving the latter access to food at world market prices (adjusted for marketing margins).” Indeed, many developing countries, ranging from South America (Argentina, Chile, Ecuador, Peru) to Asia (China, India, Philippines, Thailand) have pushed for these very policies, only for the WTO to reject them, as happened in the disastrous breakdown of trade negotiations in the 2003 Cancun meetings of the Doha Development Round.

=== Peasant protests ===
Multilateral organizations such as the WTO necessarily support globalization in their encouragement of trade between nations. This could be argued to have some benefits— greater employment opportunities, an increase of real wages, higher rates of technological innovation, and an overall higher quality of life, especially for urban populations. However, because these benefits only apply to certain sectors, many populations suffer from the unintended consequences of globalization policies.

An example of this can be highlighted with peasant populations across the world—between pressures to diversify a nation's sectors and oppressive AoA conditions, governments of developing nations have provided consistently diminishing support to its agricultural community over the years. The liberalization of the agricultural sector has led to lower agricultural and commodity prices, “consolidation of giant agribusinesses, a homogenization of the global food system, and the erosion of supply management mechanisms;” simultaneously, government subsidies have been stripped away and other structural supports, such as state development banks, extension agencies and commodities boards, have become privatized. In addition, peasants’ reliance on modern technology and fertilizers has risen, linking them to markets of commodities, credit, technology, and land; because of a proliferation of factors beyond their control, they have become more vulnerable to issues such as food insecurity. With an increase of destabilizing forces and a decrease in protectionist measures, peasants have been forced to look for alternative means for survival—and patterns show higher rates of dependence on local loan sharks and a growth in participation within the informal economy.

The beginning of transnational peasant movements began with the success of the Movimento dos Trabalhadores Rurais sem Terra (MST, or Brazilian Landless Movement), wherein the rural population, many of them indigenous, grouped together to demand right to land ownership. Not only did this movement demonstrate the ability for different populations to band together, and thus inspired collective action on a global scale, but also lay the framework of the following campaigns, including the emphasis on grassroots political participation and the use of non-governmental organizations (NGOs) for resources. Together, these groups have raised awareness on the devastating effects of foreign debt in their respective countries and have even organized militant uprisings; but two central demands have circulated time and again: to “remove agriculture from the purview of the WTO,” and the concept of food sovereignty.

“Take agriculture out of WTO” has been a cry heard with “increasing frequency since the 1999 Seattle protests,” including those at the 2000 Doha Round and 2003 Cancun meetings. Global communities such as La Via Campesina (Peasant Road) and over fifty other organizations banded together to claim: “the WTO is undemocratic and unaccountable, has increased global inequality and insecurity, promotes unsustainable production and consumption patterns, erodes diversity, and undermines social and environmental priorities.” Thus, they demanded the removal of not simply the AoA, but also any other relevant accord, including the Agreement on Trade-Related Aspects of Intellectual Property Rights (TRIPS), the General Agreement on Trade in Services (GATS), Sanitary and Phytosanitary Measures (SPS), Quantitative Restrictions (QRs), and Subsidies and Countervailing Measures (SCM). Food sovereignty highlights that food is a fundamental human right and condemns the WTO's treatment of agricultural purely as a commodity, rather than “as a means of livelihood and nourishment for peasants and small farmers.”

Similar protests have been organized outside those at WTO ministerial meetings; most notably the formation of the International Federation of Agricultural Producers (IFAP), India's protest against TRIPS and foreign corporate patents for the neem tree native to India; French farmers’ protest against false Roquefort cheese; and the creation of APM-Afrique to improve coffee and cotton sectors.

==== Indigenous populations ====
It is worth noting that peasant and indigenous communities are highly linked to each other, especially in Central and South America. Thus, many of the peasant organizations and movements also campaign for indigenous rights, including the right to land and governance of their own people.

== Labour and environment ==
Other critics claim that the issues of labor and environment are steadfastly ignored. Steve Charnovitz, former Director of the Global Environment and Trade Study (GETS), believes that the WTO "should begin to address the link between trade and labor and environmental concerns." He also argues that "in the absence of proper environmental regulation and resource management, increased trade might cause so much adverse damage that the gains from trade would be less than the environmental costs." Further, labor unions condemn the labor rights record of developing countries, arguing that to the extent the WTO succeeds at promoting globalization, then in equal measure do the environment and labor rights suffer.

On the other side, many other people and Khor responds that "if environment and labor were to enter the WTO system [...] it would be conceptually difficult to argue why other social and cultural issues should also not enter." He also argues that "trade measures have become a vehicle for big corporations and social organizations in promoting their interests." Scholars have identified GATT Article XX as a central exception provision that may be invoked by states to deploy policies that conflict with trade liberalization.

Bhagwati is also critical towards "rich-country lobbies seeking on imposing their unrelated agendas on trade agreements." According to Bhagwati, these lobbies and especially the "rich charities have now turned to agitating about trade issues with much energy understanding." Therefore, both Bhagwati and Arvind Panagariya have criticized the introduction of TRIPS (Trade-Related Aspects of Intellectual Property Rights) into the WTO framework, fearing that such non-trade agendas might overwhelm the organization's function. According to Panagariya, "taken in isolation, TRIPS resulted in reduced welfare for developing countries and the world as a whole." Bhagwati asserts that "intellectual property does not belong in the WTO, since protecting it is simply a matter of royalty collection [...] The matter was forced onto the WTO's agenda during the Uruguay Round by the pharmaceutical and software industries, even though this risked turning the WTO into a glorified collection agency."

== Decision making ==
Another critic has characterized the "green room" discussions in the WTO as unrepresentative and non-inclusive; more active participants, representing more diverse interests and objectives, have complicated WTO decision-making, and the process of "consensus-building" has broken down. Results of green room discussions are presented to the rest of the WTO which may vote on the result. They have thus proposed the establishment of a small, informal steering committee (a "consultative board") that can be delegated responsibility for developing consensus on trade issues among the member countries. The Third World Network has called the WTO "the most non-transparent of international organisations", because "the vast majority of developing countries have very little real say in the WTO system".

Many non-governmental organizations, such as the World Federalist Movement/Institute for Global Policy, are calling for the creation of a WTO parliamentary assembly to allow for more democratic participation in WTO decision making. Dr Caroline Lucas recommended that such an assembly "have a more prominent role to play in the form of parliamentary scrutiny, and also in the wider efforts to reform the WTO processes, and its rules". However, Dr Raoul Marc Jennar argues that a consultative parliamentary assembly would be ineffective for the following reasons:

1. It does not resolve the problem of "informal meetings" whereby industrialized countries negotiate the most important decisions;
2. It does not reduce the de facto inequality which exists between countries with regards to an effective and efficient participation to all activities within all WTO bodies;
3. It does not rectify the multiple violations of the general principles of law which affect the dispute settlement mechanism.

The lack of transparency is often seen as a problem for democracy. Politicians can negotiate for regulations that would not be possible or accepted in a democratic process in their own nations. "Some countries push for certain regulatory standards in international bodies and then bring those regulations home under the requirement of harmonization and the guise of multilateralism." This is often referred to as Policy Laundering.

== National sovereignty ==
Conservative and nationalist critics of the World Trade Organization argue that it undermines and threatens national sovereignty. This argument became prominent in the lead up to the 2019 election of Appellate Body judges, when the US President Trump chose to gridlock the WTO in order to regain national sovereignty.
