= Environmental policy of the United States =

Governmental action to protect the environment

Development of carbon dioxide emissions

The environmental policy of the United States is a federal governmental action to regulate activities that have an environmental impact in the United States. The goal of environmental policy is to protect the environment for future generations while interfering as little as possible with the efficiency of commerce or the liberty of the people and to limit inequity in who is burdened with environmental costs. Framing of environmental issues often influences how policies are developed, especially when economic concerns or national security are used to either justify or contest actions. As his first official act bringing in the 1970s, President Richard Nixon signed the U.S. National Environmental Policy Act (NEPA) into law on New Year's Day, 1970. Also in the same year, America began celebrating Earth Day, which has been called "the big bang of U.S. environmental politics, launching the country on a sweeping social learning curve about ecological management never before experienced or attempted in any other nation." NEPA established a comprehensive US national environmental policy and created the requirement to prepare an environmental impact statement for "major federal actions significantly affecting the quality of the environment." Author and consultant Charles H. Eccleston has called NEPA the world's "environmental Magna Carta".

As a result of the environmental movement in the United States, environmental policy continued to mature in the 1970s as several broad environmental laws were passed, regulating air and water pollution and forming the Environmental Protection Agency (EPA). After some time, a split between the two parties was formed in regard to environmental policy. Democrats tended to support stronger environmental regulations, whereas Republicans opposed them because of economic concerns. Partially due to the high costs associated with these regulations, there has been a backlash from business and politically conservative interests, limiting increases to environmental regulatory budgets, and slowing efforts to protect the environment. Since the 1970s, despite frequent legislative gridlock, there have been significant achievements in environmental regulation, including increases in air and water quality and, to a lesser degree, control of hazardous waste. Due to increasing scientific consensus on global warming and political pressure from environmental groups, modifications to the United States energy policy and limits on greenhouse gas have been suggested.

As established under NEPA, the US was the first nation in the world to introduce the concept of preparing an environmental impact statement (EIS) to evaluate the alternatives and impacts of proposed federal actions. The EIS process is designed to forge federal policies, programs, projects, and plans. A large percentage of nations around the world have adopted provisions that emulate the American EIS process.

== Policy tools ==
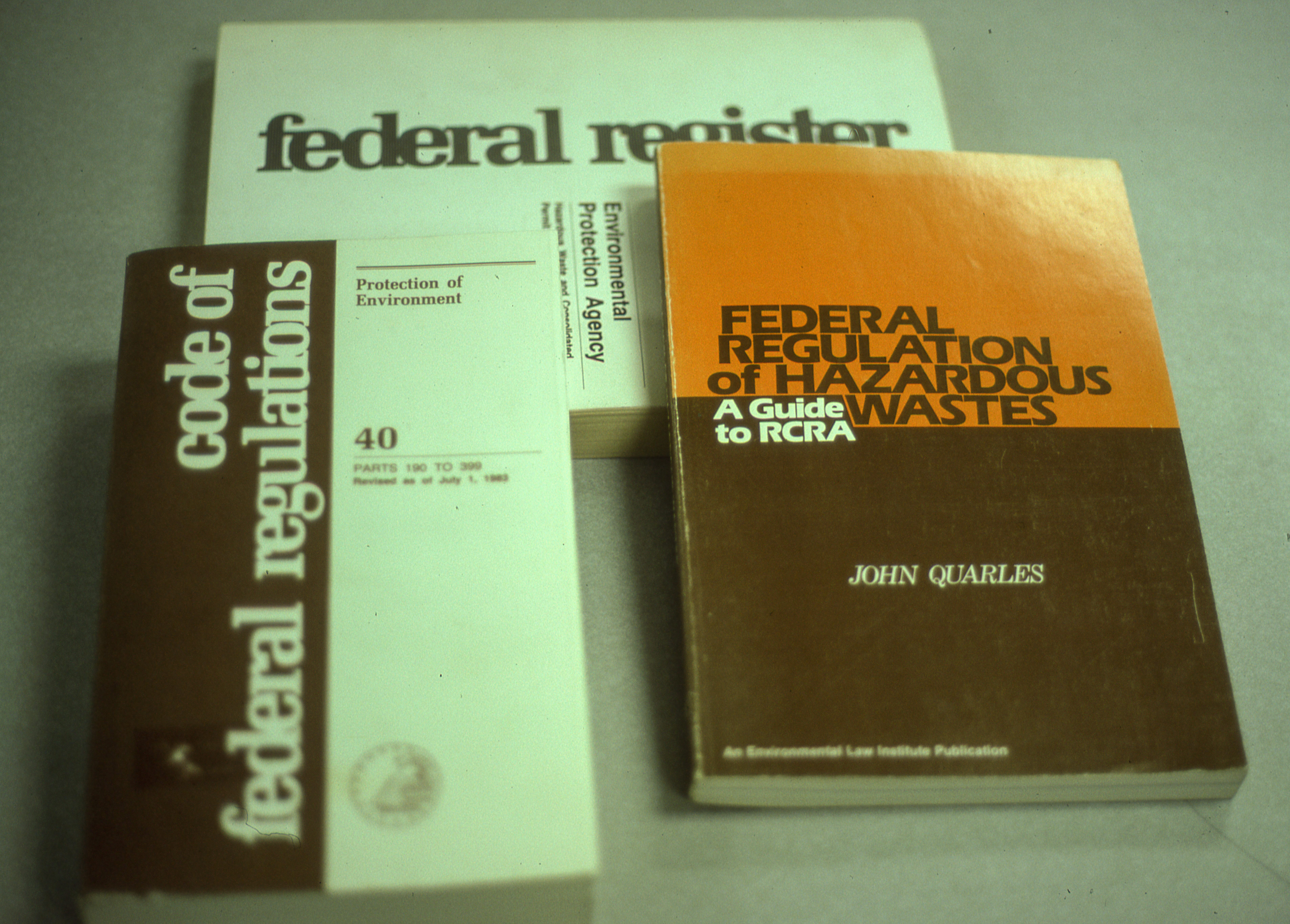
Federal Register documents and literature related to US environmental regulations, including the Resource Conservation and Recovery Act (RCRA), 1987

The two major policy tools for protecting the environment are rules and inducements. The United States has chosen to use rules, primarily through regulation. Such regulations can come in the form of design standards and performance standards. Performance standards specify emission levels and let those covered by the rules decide how those levels will be met. Design standards specify exactly how performance standards will be met. However, design standards have sometimes been criticized for their high costs of compliance which delay environmental action, especially in energy-intensive industries. On the other hand, performance standards often give business flexibility-an incentive to find innovative ways to achieve program goals with as little waste and cost as possible.

Alternatively, the government can use inducements, or "market reform". Inducements are rewards and punishments used to influence people or groups. The two major types of market reforms are charge systems, such as emissions taxes, and "tradable permit systems". One type of tradable permit system is an "auction of pollution rights" in which the amount of allowed pollution is set and divided into units, which are then auctioned, giving environmental organizations the opportunity to buy the units to create a cleaner environment than originally planned. Such a plan was implemented for SO_{2} emissions in the 1990 Acid Rain Program and has been undertaken for greenhouse gases on a regional scale as a way to mitigate global warming. These market-based approaches, primarily the Acid Rain Program, have been able to demonstrate measurable reductions of the pollutants and have stimulated the development of similar mechanisms for greenhouse gases. The trading of pollution permits in such schemes encourages business to seek out efficient ways to reduce emissions at low cost while meeting environmental goals. However, the market reform that worked for Acid Rain is called the Cap-and-Trade System, which is used throughout the US and globally. Cap-and-trade is one policy option for addressing carbon emissions and pollution. In a cap-and-trade system, the government sets an overall emissions cap, a definitive environmental goal or target for pollution levels. The government then issues tradable allowances that grant businesses the right to emit a set amount of the regulated pollutant. Companies that can reduce their emissions more cheaply than others can sell their extra allowances to companies that face higher costs to comply with the cap. This process establishes a market price for pollutants like carbon or sulfur dioxide, incentivizing polluting facilities to implement the most cost-efficient emissions reduction options. It also encourages investment in new low-carbon technologies. Yet there are concerns about equitable distribution and potential hoarding, which led the EPA to hold back 2.8% of allowances for auctions to promote market liquidity. There are many advantages of cap and trade. It sets a definitive emissions target, is flexible and can link to other systems, allows the market and firms to innovate and make choices, and is easier for politicians to support than a carbon tax. Yet there are disadvantages such as uncertainty for firms, the possibility that the market may not work as intended, the risk of special interests perverting the system, the potential for wealth transfer to large polluters if permits are given away for free, and debate over the benefits of allowing carbon offsets.

== Power delegation and policy jurisdiction ==
=== Executive branch ===
Governmental authority on environmental issues in the United States is highly fragmented at the national, state and local levels. While the EPA is the most comprehensive environmental agency, its authority on these matters is not absolute. Virtually all of the federal executive departments have some area of environmental authority. This fragmented system sometimes leads to inconsistent enforcement because different levels of government, depending on local and regional economic concerns, may prioritize environmental regulations differently. For instance, states heavily dependent upon the fossil fuel industries may start to use laxer enforcement policies than states with more diversified economies.

As chief executive, the President plays an important role in environmental policy. Presidents such as Teddy Roosevelt, Franklin D. Roosevelt, and Richard Nixon have acted as "bully pulpit" to gain support for environmental legislation. Their role as chief diplomat enables them to enact international agreements with environmental stipulations. Ronald Reagan signed the Montreal Protocol, Obama was a leader in negotiating the Paris agreement and the Bush administration rejected the Kyoto protocol. Presidents can use their "soft" power to draw attention to environmental issues and set broad administrative goals. They also have the power to veto legislation or issue executive orders to influence administrative behavior.

Federal Agency	Environmental Responsibilities
White House Office	Overall policy, Agency coordination
Office of Management and Budget	Budget, Agency coordination and management
Council on Environmental Quality	Environmental policy, Agency coordination, Environmental impact statements
Department of Health and Human Services	Health
Environmental Protection Agency	Air and water pollution, Solid waste, Radiation, Pesticides, Noise, Toxic substances
Department of Justice	Environmental litigation
Department of the Interior	Public lands, Energy, Minerals, National parks, Endangered species
Department of Agriculture	Forestry, Soil and Conservation
Department of Defense	Civil works construction, Dredge and fill permits, Pollution control from defense facilities
Nuclear Regulatory Commission	License and regulate nuclear power
Department of State	International environment
Department of Commerce	Oceanic and atmospheric monitoring and research
Department of Labor	Occupational health
Department of Housing and Urban Development	Housing, Urban parks, Urban planning
Department of Transportation	Mass transit, Roads, Aircraft noise, Oil pollution
Department of Energy	Energy policy coordination, Petroleum allocation research and development
Tennessee Valley Authority	Electric power generation
Federal Emergency Management Agency	Cleaning up the natural disasters caused by climate change
Department of Homeland Security|United States Coast Guard	Maritime and environmental stewardship, National Pollution Funds Center (NPFC)

=== Legislative branch ===
Fragmentation within the executive branch is duplicated in Congress and within the states. Congress exercises a major role through legislative and oversight hearings. It also influences policy by publishing studies and reports. Individual members typically take announce positions and some make the environment one of their specialties. The EPA is the concern of over half the Congressional committees. Some seventy committees and subcommittees control water quality policy, for example. Such fragmentation creates both opportunities and problems. While such a variety of committees provide enormous access for environmentalist and industry groups to lobby, the division of tasks means that no one committee or agency looks at environmental problems as a whole. Building policy consensus in Congress is rarely easy because of the diversity of interests and of members whose concerns need to be met.

Senate and House committee jurisdictions
Senate
Committee on Agriculture, Nutrition and Forestry	Pesticides
Committee on Appropriations	Appropriations
Committee on the Budget	Budget
Committee on Commerce, Science, and Transportation	Oceans, Research and Development, Radiation, Toxics
Committee on Energy and Natural Resources	Synthetic fuels, Conservation oversight, Energy budget, Mines, Oil shale, Outer continental shelf, Strip mining
Committee on Environment and Public Works	Air, Drinking water, Noise, Nuclear energy, Ocean dumping, Outer continental shelf, Research and development, Solid waste, Toxics, Water
Committee on Foreign Relations	International environment
Committee on Homeland Security and Governmental Affairs	Interagency subject area
Committee on Labor and Human Resources	Public health
Committee on Small Business	Impact of environmental regulations on small business
House
Committee on Agriculture	Pesticides
Committee on Appropriations	Appropriations
Committee on the Budget	Budget
Committee on Oversight and Government Reform	Interagency subject area
Committee on Interior and Insular Affairs	Synthetic fuels, Conservation oversight, Energy budget, Mines, Oil shale, Outer continental shelf, Radiation (Nuclear Regulatory Commission oversight), Strip mining
Committee on Energy and Commerce	Air, Drinking water, Noise, Radiation, Solid waste, Toxics
Committee on Natural Resources	Ocean dumping
Committee on Transportation and Infrastructure	Noise, Water pollution, Water resources
Committee on Science and Technology	Research and Development
Committee on Small Business	Impact of environmental regulations on small business

== History ==
Major Environmental Legislation
Year	Law	Year	Law
1899	Refuse Act	1975	Hazardous Materials Transportation Act
1918	Migratory Bird Treaty Act of 1918	1976	Resource Conservation and Recovery Act
1948	Federal Water Pollution Control Act	1976	Solid Waste Disposal Act
1955	Air Pollution Control Act	1976	Toxic Substances Control Act
1963	Clean Air Act (1963)	1977	Clean Air Act Amendments
1965	Solid Waste Disposal Act	1977	Clean Water Act Amendments
1965	Water Quality Act	1980	CERCLA (Superfund)
1967	Air Quality Act	1984	Hazardous and Solid Waste Amendments
1969	National Environmental Policy Act	1986	Safe Drinking Water Act Amendments
1970	Clean Air Act (1970)	1986	Superfund Amendments and Reauthorization Act
1970	Occupational Safety and Health Act	1986	Emergency Wetlands Resources Act
1972	Consumer Product Safety Act	1987	Water Quality Act
1972	Federal Insecticide, Fungicide, and Rodenticide Act	1990	Oil Pollution Act
1972	Clean Water Act	1990	Clean Air Act (1990)
1972	Noise Control Act	1993	North American Free Trade Agreement
1973	Endangered Species Act	1996	Safe Drinking Water Act Amendments
1974	Safe Drinking Water Act	2003	Healthy Forests Initiative

There are many more environmental laws in the United States, both at the federal and state levels. The common law of property and takings also play an important role in environmental issues. In addition, the law of standing, relating to who has a right to bring a lawsuit, is an important issue in environmental law in the United States.

=== Origins of the environmental movement ===
The history of environmental law in the United States can be traced back to early roots in common law doctrines, for example, the law of nuisance and the public trust doctrine. The first statutory environmental law was the Rivers and Harbors Act of 1899, which has been largely superseded by the Clean Water Act. However, most current major environmental statutes, such as the federal statutes listed above, were passed during the modern environmental movement spanning the late 1960s through the early 1980s. Prior to the passage of these statutes, most federal environmental laws were not nearly as comprehensive.

The precursor of the modern environmental movement in the United States was the early 20th century conservation movement, associated with President Theodore Roosevelt and Gifford Pinchot. During this period, the U.S. Forest Service was formed and public concern for consumer protection began, epitomized by the publication of The Jungle by Upton Sinclair. The modern environmental movement was inspired in part by the publication of Rachel Carson's controversial 1962 book Silent Spring, which pointed out the perils of pesticide use and rallied concern for the environment in general. Carson argued that nature deserved human protection and referred to pesticides as the atomic bomb for insects. She stated that these pesticides would cycle through the environment hurting humans and nature and thought they should be used wisely. Carson played a big role in environment activism that was later to come. Along with critiques of the misuse of technology from figures such as William Ophuls, Barry Commoner and Garrett Hardin, the ineffectiveness and criticism of the 1960s-era Clean Air and Clean Water acts gave a burgeoning momentum to the environmental movement.

In addition to growing public support, structural changes such as Congressional reform and new access to the courts gave environmentalists new power to enact change. The movement that formed held three key values: ecology, health, and sustainability. These values—that people depend on and are interconnected with the environment, that damage to the environment can cause health issues, and that dependence on non-renewable resources should be limited—along with a uniquely sympathetic president and Congress, led to great environmental policy change in the 1970s. In 1972 the Club of Rome report came out which was a scholarly effort to gauge the severity of the environmental problem. A team of researchers concluded with one of the most alarming appraisals of the time and set off widespread debates over the findings, its methods, and policy implications. The model was built mainly to investigate major trends of global concerns such as accelerating industrialization, rapid population growth, widespread malnutrition, depletion of nonrenewable resources and a deteriorating environment. They concluded that if the present growth trends in world population, industrialization, pollution, food production, and resource depletion remains unchanged then the limits to growth on this planet will be reached sometime within the next one hundred years.

One lawsuit that has been widely recognized as one of the earliest environmental cases is Scenic Hudson Preservation Conference v. Federal Power Commission, decided in 1965 by the Second Circuit Court of Appeals, prior to passage of the major federal environmental statutes. The case helped halt the construction of a power plant on Storm King Mountain in New York State. The case has been described as giving birth to environmental litigation and helping create the legal doctrine of standing to bring environmental claims. The Scenic Hudson case also is said to have helped inspire the passage of the National Environmental Policy Act, and the creation of such environmental advocacy groups as the Natural Resources Defense Council.

=== Presidential involvements ===
For previous administrations see Environmental history of the United States#White House roles

==== Nixon and the Environmental Decade (1970–1980) ====
On January 1, 1970, President Richard Nixon signed the National Environmental Policy Act (NEPA), beginning the 1970s that some have called the "environmental decade." NEPA created the Council on Environmental Quality which oversaw the environmental impact of federal actions. Later in the year, Nixon created the Environmental Protection Agency (EPA), which consolidated environmental programs from other agencies into a single entity. The legislation during this period concerned primarily first-generation pollutants in the air, surface water, groundwater, and solid waste disposal. Air pollutants such as particulates, sulfur dioxide, nitrogen dioxide, carbon monoxide, and ozone were put under regulation, and issues such as acid rain, visibility, and global warming were also concerns. In surface water, the pollutants of concern were conventional pollutants (bacteria, biochemical oxygen demand and suspended solids), dissolved solids, nutrients, and toxic substances such as metals and pesticides. For groundwater, the pollutants included biological contaminants, inorganic and organic substances, and radionuclides. Finally, solid waste contaminants from agriculture, industry, mining, municipalities, and other sectors were put under control.

The Clean Air Act amendments of 1970 (CAA) and the Federal Water Pollution Control Act amendments of 1972 (Clean Water Act) moved environmental concerns in a new direction.

The new CAA standards that were to be promulgated were unattainable with existing technology—they were technology-forcing. The standards that the EPA put into place called mainly for state implementation. Each state prepared state implementation plans (SIPs), requiring EPA approval. The 1970 CAA also established deadlines and penalties for automobile emission standards in new cars, resulting in the development and adoption of catalytic converters and greatly reducing automobile pollution.

For wastewater, each discharging facility was required to obtain a permit, and EPA began to issue new federal standards ("effluent guidelines") that required industries to use the "best available technology" for treating their wastes. Congress also established a massive public works program to assist in the construction of sewage treatment plants for municipalities, and most plants were required to meet secondary treatment standards.

Political scientists Byron Daines and Glenn Sussman have evaluated all the presidents from Franklin Roosevelt to George W. Bush on their environmentalism. in their judgment, all the Democrats are evaluated as having a positive impact on the environment, along with one Republican: Nixon. Capital the other five Republicans had a mixed impact (Eisenhower, Ford and George H.W. Bush), or negative impacts (Ronald Reagan and George W. Bush). Daines and Sussman conclude their analysis by identifying six major achievements for which they give credit to Nixon.

- He broadened the attention span of the Republican Party to include environmental issues, for the first time since the days of Theodore Roosevelt. He thereby "dislodged the Democratic Party from its position of dominance over the environment."
- He used presidential powers, and promoted legislation in Congress to create a permanent political structure, most notably the Environmental Protection Agency, the White House Council on Environmental Quality, the National Oceanic and Atmospheric Administration, and others.
- He helped ensure that Congress build a permanent structure supportive of environmentalism, especially the National Environmental Policy Act of 1970, which enjoined all federal agencies to help protect the environment.
- Nixon appointed a series of strong environmentalists into highly visible positions including William Ruckelshaus, Russell Train, Russell W. Peterson, and John C. Whitaker (who was a senior White House aide for four years, becoming Undersecretary of the Interior in 1973).
- Nixon initiated worldwide diplomatic attention to environmental issues, working especially with NATO.
- Finally, they assert: "Nixon did not have to be personally committed to the environment to become one of the most successful presidents in promoting environmental priorities."

==== The Ford Administration (1974–1977) ====
Environmentalism was a peripheral issue during the short administration of Gerald Ford, 1974–1977. His primary concern was a stable economy, and environmental issues took less priority than policies for economic growth. Environmentalists left over from the Nixon days, such as EPA head Russell Train, opposed this, while opponents of environmentalism, such as Thomas S. Kleppe, encouraged this. As Secretary of the Interior, Kleppe was a leader of the "Sagebrush Rebellion" in which Western ranchers had the support of state government in 15 Western states who passed laws and launched litigation to try to nullify federal environmental protections that interfered with their business. They lost repeatedly in the federal courts, most notably in the Supreme Court decision in Kleppe v. New Mexico (1976).

Ford's successes included the addition of two national monuments, six historical sites, three historic parks and two national preserves. None were controversial. He signed the Safe Drinking Water Act (1974) and the Resource Conservation and Recovery Act (1976), two of the landmark laws approved in the "environmental decade." In the international field, agreements with Canada, Mexico, China, Japan, the Soviet Union and several European countries included provisions to protect endangered species. Ford narrowly defeated Ronald Reagan for renomination in 1976, when environmental issues were not an issue. He was defeated by Jimmy Carter, who attacked Ford's environmental record.

==== The Carter Administration (1977–1981) ====
Jimmy Carter supported many of the goals of the environmentalist movement, and appointed prominent environmentalists to high positions. As president his rhetoric strongly supported environmentalism, with a certain softness regarding his acceptance of nuclear energy; he been trained in nuclear energy with atomic submarines in the Navy. Carter signed several significant bills to protect the environment, including the Surface Mining Control and Reclamation Act of 1977, which regulates strip mining. In 1980 Carter signed into law a bill that established Superfund, a federal program designed to clean up sites contaminated with hazardous substances.

By midterm, however, Carter's inability to work closely with the Democratic Congress meant that many initiatives were never passed, to the great disappointment of his supporters. Carter's weakness was exhibited in his 1977 decision to eliminate funding for 19 water resource construction projects, despite strong objections from Congressmen who favored the programs. Carter distrusted the programs, based on his own troubled gubernatorial experience with the Army Corps of Engineers, his campaign rhetoric and the rhetoric of his environmentalist supporters, compounded by his lack of experience with Congress. He was forced to retreat, and lost much of his influence on Capitol Hill. Democrats in Congress were displeased with his moralistic, executive-oriented, rational approach to decision-making and his reluctance adjustment to go along with standard congressional methods of compromise, patronage, and logrolling.

Carter was successful in the long term in his energy policy, although his poor publicity apparatus obscured that success during his time in office. Americans had become alarmingly dependent on imported oil, purchasing about a fourth of all the OPEC production. American consumption per capita was more than double that of Europe or Japan. Carter's goal was to reverse this dependence. He supported the 1977 laws creating the Department of Energy, and the Emergency Natural Gas Act, and created the Synthetic Fuels Corporation, funded with $20 billion for joint ventures with the private sector.

A 1977 memo from President Carter's chief science adviser Frank Press warned of the possibility of catastrophic climate change caused by increasing carbon dioxide concentrations introduced into the atmosphere by fossil fuel consumption. However, other issues—such as known harms to health from pollutants, and avoiding energy dependence on other nations—seemed more pressing and immediate. Energy Secretary James Schlesinger advised that "the policy implications of this issue are still too uncertain to warrant Presidential involvement and policy initiatives", and the fossil fuel industry began sowing doubt about climate science.

Cecil Andrus, formerly Governor of Idaho, served as Carter's Secretary of the Interior during 1978 to 1981. He convinced Carter to withdraw nearly half of 375 million acres of public domain land from commercial use in a series of executive moves and new laws. In December 1978 the President placed more 56 million acres of the state's federal lands into the National Park System, protecting them from mineral or oil development. The 1980 Alaska National Interest Lands Conservation Act doubled the amount of public land set aside for national parks and wildlife refuges. Carter used his power under the 1906 Antiquities Act to set aside 57 million acres in 17 national monuments. The remaining acres were withdrawn under the Federal Land Policy and Management Act of 1976. Business and conservative interests complained that economic growth would be hurt.

==== The Reagan Administration (1981–1989) ====
Ronald Reagan entered office skeptical of environmental protection laws and campaigned against harsh government regulation with the environmental arena in mind. As Reagan entered office, he was given two transition reports. One report was Mandate for Leadership, published by The Heritage Foundation. Another was "Avoiding a GOP Economic Dunkirk" from conservative Congressman David Stockman(R-MI). Each report called for drastic changes in environmental regulation, primarily through administrative changes. In pursuit of this strategy, Reagan gradually reduced the EPA's budget by 30% through the Omnibus Budget Reconciliation Act of 1981, cut the number of EPA employees, and appointed people at key agency positions who would enthusiastically follow the administration line. Appointees such as Anne Burford at the EPA and James G. Watt at the Department of the Interior were overtly hostile to environmental protection. Through his appointments, Reagan changed the operations of environmental protection from stiff regulation to "cooperative regulation." (Burford and most of her Assistant Administrators were forced to resign in 1983 due to scandals involving their mismanagement of Superfund and other EPA programs.)

Under this administrative strategy of regulatory relief, environmental laws were written and interpreted more favorably for industry interests. The Office of Management and Budget (OMB) was also given new powers to write regulations. During the first Reagan administration, the OMB was given the power to require a favorable cost-benefit analysis of any regulation before it could be implemented. This was used to delay new regulations, and changes that resulted in regulatory relief often had this requirement waived. At the beginning of the second Reagan administration, the OMB was given more power. All regulatory agencies were required to submit proposals each year for all major environmental regulation, which allowed OMB to reduce regulatory efforts before such proposed regulations became public.

Within a few months after entering the White House, Reagan removed the solar panels that his predecessor Carter had installed on the roof of the White House's West Wing. "Reagan's political philosophy viewed the free market as the best arbiter of what was good for the country. Corporate self-interest, he felt, would steer the country in the right direction," the author Natalie Goldstein wrote in "Global Warming.". (In October 2010, President Obama planned to reintroduce the solar panels on the White House roofs, after 31 years.)

==== The George H. W. Bush Administration (1989–1993) ====
Environmental policy during the first Bush administration contained a mixture of innovation and restriction. George H. W. Bush appointed an environmentalist, William Reilly, to head the EPA, along with others with strong environmental inclinations. Before accepting the appointment, Reilly secured the President's agreement to support his pro-environment agenda and his access to the White House, but competing interests caused conflicts. In other departments with environmental responsibilities and in White House offices, however, he appointed people who were more development-oriented, such as John H. Sununu, Richard Darman, and Dan Quayle. While considerable regulation was initially passed, during his last two years in office he severely restricted regulation, and in 1992, a total freeze was put on new regulations.

On July 21, 1989, Bush sent a bill to Congress proposing amendments to the Clean Air Act. The core of the amendments were meant to reduce acid rain by limiting sulfur dioxide emissions from coal burning plants, to bring eighty urban areas up to current air quality standards and to lower emissions from over two- hundred airborne toxic chemicals. Bush supported a cap-and-trade system to reduce sulfur dioxide emissions, a strategy which allowed utilities flexibility in meeting the laws goal. The final version of the bill included new regulatory programs for control of acid rain and for the issuance of stationary source operating permits, and expansion of the regulatory program for toxic air emissions. Congress passed the bill with large majorities in both houses, and Bush signed the bill on November 15, 1990.

The private-sector Council on Competitiveness (distinct from the federal Competitiveness Policy Council) was formed in 1989 to play the same role as the previous Task Force on Regulatory Relief that Bush had served on in the Reagan administration, which was to negotiate on behalf of the President for regulatory relief with the heads of federal agencies. This executive branch agency negotiated with EPA Administrator Reilly, leading to industry-favorable rulings such as the redefinition of wetlands and the allowance of untreated toxic chemicals in local landfills (this was later reversed). While previous regulatory-relief efforts, such as Reagan's use of OMB, were subject to Congressional oversight, the Council on Competitiveness was independent and was not required to keep records of its proceedings. The Council on Competitiveness received its authority from a White House memorandum and its members included Vice President Dan Quayle, Treasury Secretary Nicholas Brady, Commerce Secretary Robert Mosbacher, and White House Chief of Staff John Sununu.

In 1992, Bush opposed international efforts at the Earth Summit in Rio de Janeiro, Brazil by refusing to sign the biodiversity treaty and lobbying to remove all binding targets from the proposal on limiting global carbon dioxide emissions.

==== The Clinton Administration (1993–2001) ====
The Bill Clinton administration promised a change in the direction of environmental policy. Al Gore, the Vice President, and appointees such as Carol Browner at EPA and Bruce Babbitt at Interior were all encouraging from an environmental standpoint. Clinton eliminated the Council on Competitiveness, returning regulatory authority to agency heads, and Clinton and Gore argued that environmental protection and economic growth were not incompatible.

Clinton's record as the governor of Arkansas, however, suggested that he would be willing to make compromises. Through a number of middle-of-the-road positions, on issues such as grazing fees in the West and clean-up of the Everglades, and through his support of the North American Free Trade Agreement in 1993 and the General Agreement on Tariffs and Trade in 1994, Clinton dissatisfied some environmentalists. Specifically, the Green Party and its candidate Ralph Nader were outspoken in their criticism of Clinton's environmental record.

Despite criticism from some environmental hardliners, the Clinton administration had several notable environmental accomplishments. Clinton created the President's Council on Sustainable Development, signed the Kyoto Protocol (although he did not submit the treaty to the Senate), and stood firm against Republican attempts after the 1994 elections to roll back environmental laws and regulations through the appropriations process. During the Clinton administration, the EPA's budget was increased, and much of the country's natural resources were put under greater protection, such as the restoration of the Everglades and the increase in size of the Everglades National Park. Important U.S. Supreme Court cases from this period included United States v. Weitzenhoff, et al.

==== The George W. Bush Administration (2001–2009) ====
===== The Clear Skies Initiative =====
In 2002 Bush announced an environment legislative initiative titled Clear Skies. The Clear Skies proposal's stated goals were to reduce three pollutants: sulfur dioxide, nitrogen dioxide, and mercury. Clear Skies was to use a market based system by allowing energy companies to buy and trade pollution credits. The president argued that since Clear Skies would use a market based system, millions of tons of pollution would be eliminated when compared to the Clean Air Act. The Clear Skies Initiative has come to symbolize this administration's preference for industry-driven solutions as part of a broader trend of deregulation to balance environmental and economic priorities. However, the president's critics argued that the Clear Skies policy would weaken provisions in the Clean Air Act.

The main provisions of the 1970 Clean Air Act were to control air pollution on a national level and an initiative program called New Source Review (NSR). The NSR initiative would require power plants to upgrade to anti-pollution technologies before they can expand existing facilities and add new technologies. The Clear Skies initiative proposed by the Bush administration main intention was to remove the New Source Review provision and deregulate some of the standards that the Clean Air Act required energy facilities to meet. The proposed removal of the NSR prompted nine northeastern states to file suit in federal court to prevent the new ruling. Advocates against Clear Skies viewed the removal of NSR as a weakening of existing laws and an "assault on the Clean Air Act". Environmental advocates and their political allies would eventually prevail in defeating the Clear Skies initiative. Critics of the initiative viewed it as an attempt to weaken environmental safeguards under the idea of modernization and efficiency.

===== Global environmental policy =====
President Bush refused to sign the Kyoto Protocol, citing fears of negative consequences for the U.S. economy. Bush also cited that developing countries like India and China were exempt from Kyoto's requirements as a reason for his opposition. This decision was important in showing the administration's skepticism toward international environmental agreements that could hold down domestic industries. When President Bush withdrew from the Kyoto Protocol, many of his critics alleged that he made his decision on ideology rather than on science. Suzanne Goldenberg from the Guardian wrote the Bush years are seen "as concerted assault, from the administration's undermining of the science". Bush's own Environmental Protection Agency head Christine Todd Whitman said the decision to walk away from Kyoto was "the equivalent to 'flipping the bird,' frankly, to the rest of the world".

Also, Eileen Claussen, president of the Pew Center on Global Climate Change said the idea of a head of state putting the science question on the table was horrifying. Bush's critics included Jonathon Dorm, Earth Policy Institute and NASA scientist James Hansen. Dorm contended that the administration made a "covert attempt to silence the science," while Hansen alleged the administration was "trying to block data showing an acceleration in global warming".

President Bush's refusal to seek ratification from the Senate was widely criticized by his opponents in the United States Congress and in the media. Some of President Bush's harshest critics claim his decision taken on the Kyoto Protocol was due to his close relationship with big oil companies. Greenpeace obtained briefing papers that revealed the administration thanked Exxon for their "active involvement" on climate change. The Guardian reported documents revealed Under-secretary Paula Dobriansky "sound out Exxon executives and other anti-Kyoto business groups on potential alternatives to Kyoto". At the same time, states like California began pursuing their own climate policies, often in collaboration with international partners like the United Kingdom, as evidenced by California's 2006 agreement with Britain to explore an emissions trading system. However, in 2003, Exxon head of public affairs Nick Thomas denied taking any position on Kyoto. This split between federal disengagement and state-level innovation highlighted the growing intergovernmental conflict in U.S. climate policy under the Bush administration.

===== Reverses promise to regulate carbon dioxide =====
In 2001, President Bush reversed an environmental campaign promise to regulate carbon dioxide emissions from coal-burning power plants. Governor Bush had pledged that power plants would have to meet clean-air standards, while promising to enact tougher policies to protect the environment. President Bush's change of heart emphasized the administration's shift towards aligning itself more closely with priorities of the fossil fuel industry. The broken campaign promise was seen as a betrayal by environmental groups. The president's reversal on regulating carbon dioxide emissions was one of a series of controversial stands on environmental issues. For example, the Bush administration ruled that factory farms can claim they do not discharge animal waste to avoid oversight from the Clean Air Act. Environmental advocates argued that these policies prioritized convenience of the industry over long-term public health and environmental protection.

===== Environmental regulation =====
The actions taken during the Bush administration were seen by environmentalists as ideological rather than scientifically based. The criticism stemmed from the president's shifting views while he was a candidate for president and executive action taken as president. The Bush presidency was viewed as being weak on the environment due to ideology and close ties with big oil. However, Eli Lehrer from the Competitive Enterprise Institute contended that the Bush administration issued more regulations than any other administration in U.S. history.

===== Reducing air pollution =====
During President Bush's eight years in office he utilized his executive powers for a number of issues. In an effort to bypass NSR requirements, the president took executive action to "curb plant-by-plant permit reviews". He also ordered the EPA to develop a regional regulation using a market-based system. The EPA came-up with the Clean Air Interstate Rule (CAIR). CAIR was aimed at reducing 70 percent of pollution from coal burning plants. However, CAIR would later be struck down by U.S. Circuit Court of Appeals for the District of Columbia in 2008. Additionally, The Clean Air Mercury Rule (CAMR) was also introduced. CAMR was created for the purpose of establishing a permanent national cap on mercury emissions.

===== Bush environmental legacy =====
In the later years of the Bush administration, the president engaged in a series of environmental proposals. He called on countries with the largest greenhouse gases to establish a global goal to control emissions and in 2008 initiated the U.S to join the United Nations to negotiate a post-2012 global climate plan after Kyoto expires. The plan calls for inclusion of both developed and developing nations to address greenhouse gas emissions. In addition, during the later years, President Bush's position on climate changed. The president had taken steps in the later years of his presidency to address environmental criticism of his broken campaign promises, and argued that the Kyoto protocol was a plan to cripple the US economy. This stern position caused him serious credibility challenges on environmental issues both nationally and globally.

==== The Obama Administration (2009–2017) ====
Environmental issues were prominent in the 2008 presidential election. Democrat Barack Obama obtained a clear lead above his rival, Republican Senator John McCain, on the environment, winning the backing of 'all mainstream environmental groups' and public confidence on the issue. Upon election, appointments such as that of the Nobel Prize-winning physicist Steven Chu were seen as a confirmation that his presidency was serious about environmental issues.

During his presidency, Obama described global warming as the greatest long-term threat facing the world. Obama took several steps to combat global warming, but was unable to pass a major bill addressing the issue, in part because many Republicans and some Democrats questioned whether global warming is occurring and whether human activity contributes to it. Following his inauguration, Obama asked that Congress pass a bill to put a cap on domestic carbon emissions. After the House passed the American Clean Energy and Security Act in 2009, Obama sought to convince the Senate to pass the bill as well. The legislation would have required the US to cut greenhouse gas emissions by 17 percent by 2020 and by 83 percent by the middle of the 21st century. However, the bill was strongly opposed by Republicans and neither it nor a separate proposed bipartisan compromise ever came up for a vote in the Senate. In 2013, Obama announced that he would bypass Congress by ordering the EPA to implement new carbon emissions limits. The Clean Power Plan, unveiled in 2015, seeks to reduce US greenhouse gas emissions by 26 to 28 percent by 2025. Obama also imposed regulations on soot, sulfur, and mercury that encouraged a transition away from coal as an energy source, but the falling price of wind, solar, and natural gas energy sources also contributed to coal's decline. Obama encouraged this successful transition away from coal in large part due to the fact that coal emits more carbon than other sources of power, including natural gas.

Obama's campaign to fight global warming found more success at the international level than in Congress. Obama attended the 2009 United Nations Climate Change Conference, which drafted the non-binding Copenhagen Accord as a successor to the Kyoto Protocol. The deal provided for the monitoring of carbon emissions among developing countries, but it did not include Obama's proposal to commit to cutting greenhouse gas emissions in half by 2050. In 2014, Obama reached an agreement with China in which China pledged to reach peak carbon emission levels by 2030, while the US pledged to cut its emissions by 26–28 percent compared to its 2005 levels. The deal provided momentum for a potential multilateral global warming agreement among the world's largest carbon emitters. Many Republicans criticized Obama's climate goals as a potential drain on the economy. At the 2015 United Nations Climate Change Conference, nearly every country in the world agreed to a landmark climate deal in which each nation committed lowering their greenhouse gas emissions. The Paris Agreement created a universal accounting system for emissions, required each country to monitor its emissions, and required each country to create a plan to reduce its emissions. Several climate negotiators noted that the US-China climate deal and the EPA's emission limits helped make the deal possible. In 2016, the international community agreed to the Kigali accord, an amendment to the Montreal Protocol which sought to reduce the use of HFCs, organic compounds that contribute to global warming.

Obama took several actions to raise vehicle fuel efficiency in the United States. In 2009, Obama announced a plan to increase the Corporate Average Fuel Economy to 35 miles per US gallon (6.7 L/100 km), a 40 percent increase from 2009 levels. Both environmentalists and auto industry officials largely welcomed the move, as the plan raised national emission standards but provided the single national efficiency standard that auto industry officials group had long desired. In 2012, Obama set even higher standards, mandating an average fuel efficiency of 54.5 miles per US gallon (4.32 L/100 km). Obama also signed the "cash-for-clunkers" bill, which provided incentives to consumers to trade in older, less fuel-efficient cars for more efficient cars. The American Recovery and Reinvestment Act of 2009 provided $54 billion in funds to encourage domestic renewable energy production, make federal buildings more energy-efficient, improve the electricity grid, repair public housing, and weatherize modest-income homes. Obama also promoted the use of plug-in electric vehicles, and 400,000 electric cars had been sold by the end of 2015.

According to a report by The American Lung Association, there was a "major improvement" in air quality under Obama.

==== The First Trump Administration (2017–2021) ====
During the 2020 California wildfires

It'll start getting cooler. You just watch. ...
I don't think science knows, actually.

— Donald Trump, on climate change
September 13, 2020

The environmental policy of the first Trump administration represented a shift from the policy priorities and goals of his predecessor, Barack Obama. While Obama's environmental agenda prioritized the reduction of carbon emissions through the use of clean renewable energy, the Trump administration sought to increase fossil fuel use and scrap environmental regulations, which he often referred to as an impediment to business. Trump has announced plans to pull the United States out of the 191 nation Paris Agreement. At a presidential debate in March 2016, Trump said he would eliminate the EPA as a part of his plan to balance the budget.

Trump's "America First Energy Plan" focused on increasing the use of fossil fuels without mentioning renewable energy. It would repeal many Obama policies including the Climate Action Plan and the Clean Water Rule, and limit the EPA's mission to protecting air and water quality. Within days of taking office he signed executive orders to approve two controversial oil pipelines and to require federal review of the Clean Water Rule and the Clean Power Plan. He also invited American manufacturers to suggest which regulations should be eliminated; industry leaders submitted 168 comments, of which nearly half targeted Environmental Protection Agency rules.

Democrats and Republicans differ in views of the seriousness of climate change, with the gap widening in the 2010s and Democrats more than three times as likely to view it as a major threat.

The sharp divide over the existence of and responsibility for global warming and climate change falls largely along political lines. Overall, 60% of Americans surveyed said oil and gas companies were "completely or mostly responsible" for climate change.

Opinion about human causation of climate change increased substantially with education among Democrats, but not among Republicans. Conversely, opinions favoring becoming carbon neutral declined substantially with age among Republicans, but not among Democrats.

The U.S. political divide on the seriousness of climate change is more than about double that of all other countries surveyed, except Australia. U.S. right-wing opinion was found to be more extreme than any other country in this Pew survey.

Acceptance of wind and solar facilities in one's community is stronger among Democrats (blue), while acceptance of nuclear power plants is stronger among Republicans (red).

Trump's appointments to key agencies dealing in energy and environmental policy reflected his commitment to deregulation, particularly of the fossil fuel industry. Several of his cabinet picks, such as Rick Perry as Secretary of Energy and Scott Pruitt as EPA Administrator, were people with a history of opposition to the agency they were named to head. The Director of the Climate and Development Lab and Brown University environmental studies professor J. Timmons Roberts said in 2018, "It's been a hard year.... Literally every country in the world is moving ahead [on reducing carbon emissions] without us."

==== The Biden Administration (2021 – 2025) ====
The environmental policy of the Biden administration is characterized by strong measures for protecting climate and environment. However, the Biden administration faces challenges in advancing ambitious environmental policies, as significant legislative changes are subject to partisan opposition. The US remains the only UN member state which has not ratified the Convention on Biological Diversity, in part because treaties require 67 Senate votes for ratification.

On his first day in office, President Biden signed the “Executive Order on Protecting Public Health and the Environment and Restoring Science to Tackle the Climate Crisis,” pointing out climate change as a central policy priority and mandating reviews of prior regulations. The order also revoked the Keystone XL pipeline permit, addressing its inconsistency with national economic and climate priorities. This decision, while aligning with environmental goals, was very controversial due to its projected elimination of 11,000 jobs and significant regional economic impacts.

==== The Second Trump Administration (2025–present) ====
===== Justice40 =====
The Justice40 Initiative is a policy framework that was launched in 2021 under Executive Order 14008 with the aim of reversing generations of environmental injustice by delivering 40% of the overall benefits of federal investments in climate, clean energy, and sustainable infrastructure to disadvantaged communities. Often low-income or historically marginalized, these communities have disproportionately carried the burden of pollution and climate-related hazards due to systemic inequities like redlining and underinvestment in public services. That would be nearly 470 programs across 19 agencies identified as Justice40-covered. Initiatives range from lead service line replacements to reductions of toxic air pollution and construction of green infrastructure in underserved neighborhoods. Under Justice40, for instance, the Environmental Protection Agency's $27 billion Greenhouse Gas Reduction Fund is supposed to catalyze public and private investments in equipping overburdened communities with clean energy. Additionally, other initiatives, like zero-emission school bus programs and the installation of advanced air quality monitors, directly tackle health disparities associated with environmental harm. The Biden Administration's 2023 Environmental Justice Scorecard makes sure transparency and accountability are present through tracking federal progress publicly in delivering tangible benefits to these vulnerable populations.

===== Build Back Better =====
The Build Back Better Framework is an integrated approach to climate change, economic recovery, and social equity. While much of the framework's provisions met legislative roadblocks, many were later rolled into laws such as the Inflation Reduction Act of 2022. The Build Back Better plan would have moved the U.S. toward clean energy by offering major consumer rebates and tax credits for electric vehicles, rooftop solar systems, and energy-efficient home retrofits. It further emphasized funding for climate resiliency, including those that improve public transportation and build out the electric vehicle charging network to protect against extreme weather conditions. Integral to the framework was factoring in the Justice40 Initiative, which aimed to guarantee disadvantaged communities received a fair share of the benefits from federal investments. An example of this is the billions slated for climate justice block grants and for environmental justice research; these were in addition to language that emphasized funding grassroots projects and minority-serving institutions, such as historically Black colleges and universities. These would have further ensured equity in a clean energy economy transition and offered solutions for environmental and economic injustices targeted on vulnerable populations.

=== Green New Deal proposed by liberals ===
This environmental policy was first proposed on February 7, 2019, by both Rep. Alexandria Ocasio-Cortez (D-NY) and Sen. Ed. Markey (D-MA). The main goal of the legislation is for the United States "to switch to 100% renewable energy in 10 years" or by 2030. In addition to addressing environmental concerns associated with climate change, the Green New Deal aims to "fix societal problems like economic inequality and racial injustice" by ensuring that everyone has access to education, clean water, and employment with benefits. It also strives to make every building energy efficient. One of the main factors for its proposal was a United Nations report released in October 2018 stating that "the world must cut greenhouse gases by almost half by 2030" to avoid the fate of irreversible damage by 2030, if the United States continues business as usual. "To stop further warming, greenhouse gases must be reduced to 350 parts per million. Carbon dioxide levels are already above 400 parts per million."

The proposed United States legislation was rejected by the Senate on March 26, 2019, with Senate Majority Leader Mitch McConnell (R-KY) leading the voting process. The legislation received 57 "no's" and 43 "presents". Despite its rejection, the Green New Deal remains an important framework influencing current U.S. energy policies, including the Biden administration’s push for renewable energy and net-zero emissions.

=== Environmentalist lawsuits blocking clean air projects ===
An editorial in The Washington Post on April 6, 2024, discusses the challenges faced by clean energy projects as caused by lawsuits filed in federal court by environmental activists. One example is the Cardinal-Hickory Creek high-voltage transmission line between Iowa and Wisconsin. It would connect over 160 renewable energy facilities producing 25 gigawatts of green power. It is facing a temporary halt due to a lawsuit by environmental groups condemning its impact on the Upper Mississippi River National Wildlife and Fish Refuge. The editorial argues this is just one example of the conflicts between environmental protection and the need for new infrastructure to support the clean energy transition. Solar, wind, and carbon capture projects often face opposition from conservation groups.

The permitting process, established by laws like the National Environmental Policy Act (NEPA), generally leans against developers and allows virtually anyone to challenge projects in court on environmental grounds. This leads to lengthy delays and increased costs for clean energy projects. Researchers found that nearly two-thirds of solar energy projects, 31% of transmission lines, and 38% of wind energy projects that completed federal environmental impact studies between 2010-2018 were litigated. The Washington Post editorial says that many environmental concerns are valid, but the permitting process does not reasonably weigh the costs and benefits of building essential clean energy infrastructure. It needs to be streamlined to accelerate the clean power expansion required to meet emissions reduction goals. The editorial concludes that Congress should reform the permitting process and preempt state and local rules that make it harder to build high-priority clean energy projects.

== Issues ==
Since the environmental movement of the 1970s, the nature of environmental issues has changed. While the initial emphasis was on conventional air and water pollutants, which were the most obvious and easily measurable problems, newer issues are long-term problems that are not easily discernible and can be surrounded by controversy.

=== Climate change ===
Though China has the greatest annual carbon dioxide emissions (area of its rectangle), the U.S. exceeds China in per capita emissions.

Cumulatively, the U.S. has emitted the greatest amount of CO_{2}, though China's emission trend is now steeper.

Per capita carbon dioxide emissions from the US have trended downward, though the US still has among the highest such rates of major emitters.

=== International law ===
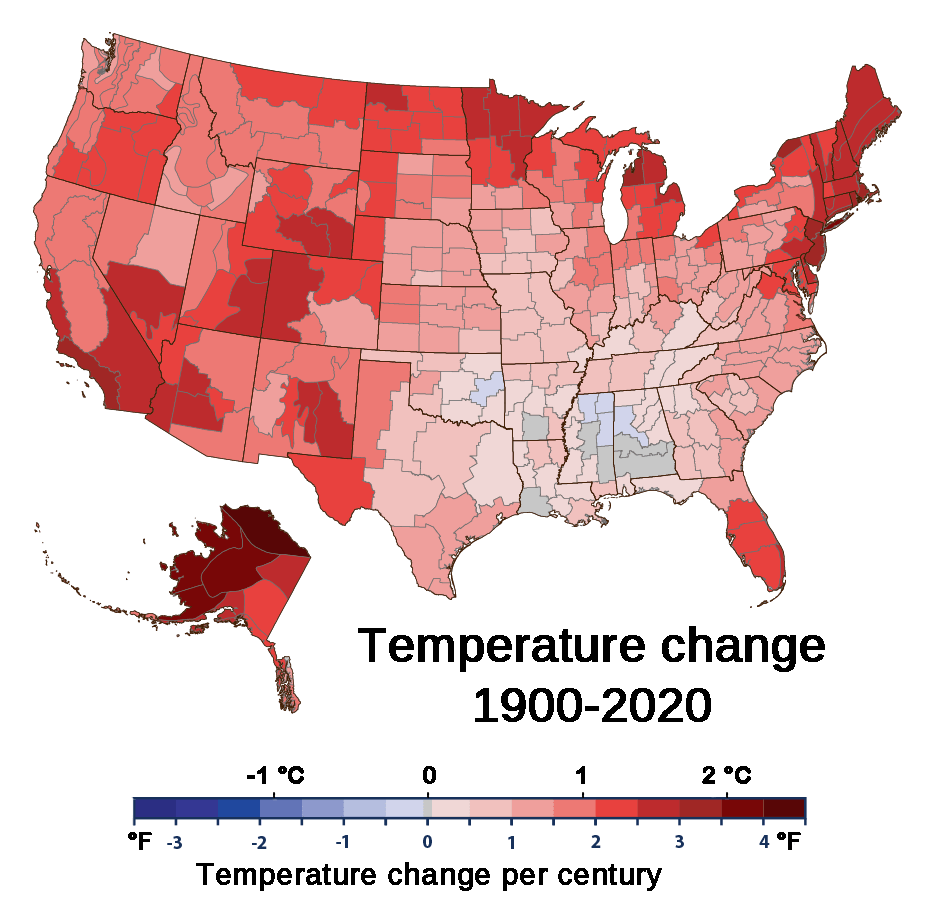
Average temperatures in almost all regions in the U.S. have increased in the last 120 years.

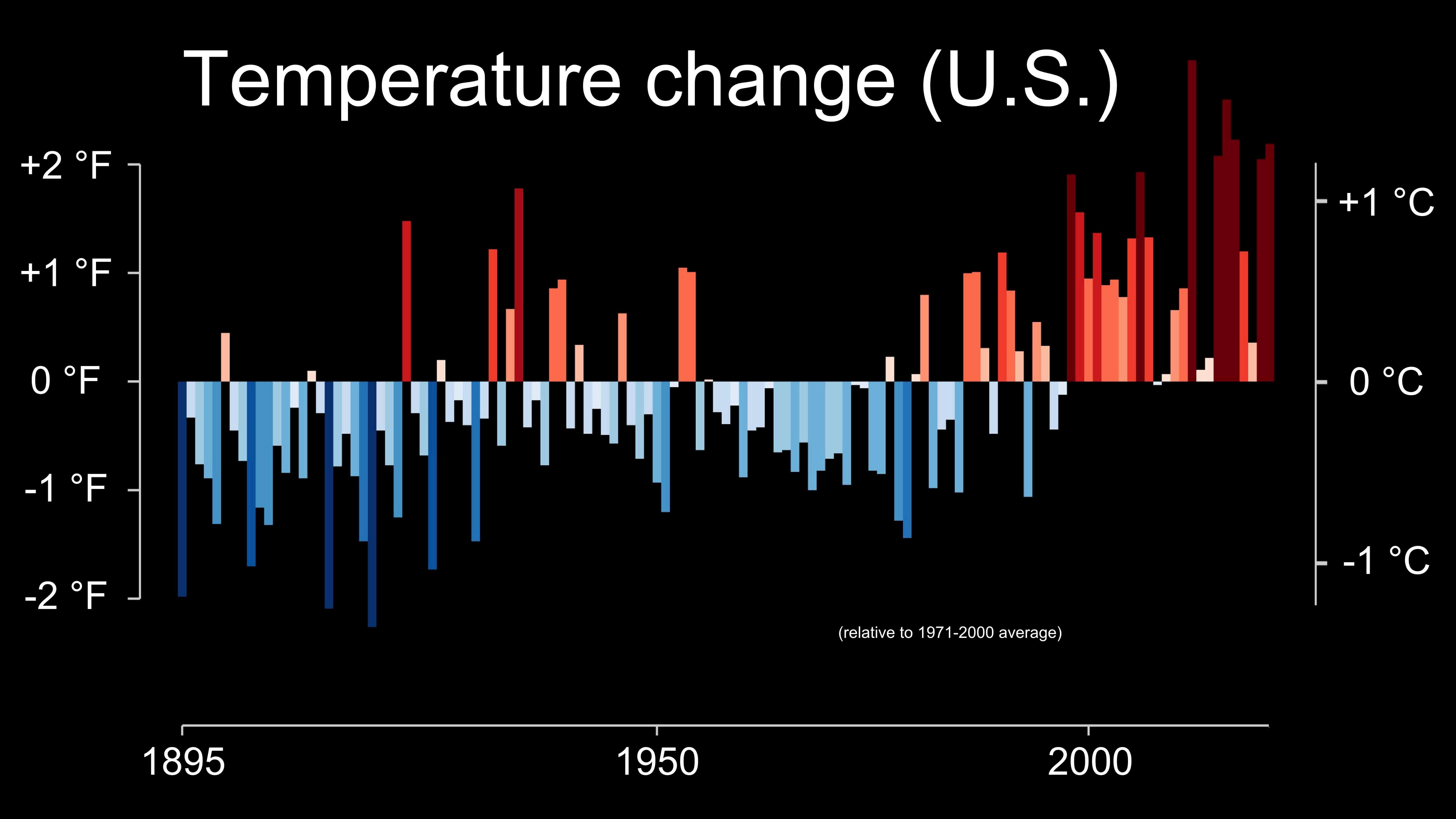
Annual temperatures averaged across the U.S. have exceeded the 1971–2000 average almost every year in the 21st century.

Climate change has led to the United States warming up by 2.6 °F (1.4 °C) since 1970. In 2023, the global average near-surface temperature reached 1.45 °C above pre-industrial levels, making it the warmest year on record. The climate of the United States is shifting in ways that are widespread and varied between regions. From 2010 to 2019, the United States experienced its hottest decade on record. Extreme weather events, invasive species, floods and droughts are increasing. Climate change's impacts on tropical cyclones and sea level rise also affect regions of the country.

Cumulatively since 1850, the U.S. has emitted a larger share than any country of the greenhouse gases causing current climate change, with some 20% of the global total of carbon dioxide alone. Current US emissions per person are among the largest in the world. Various state and federal climate change policies have been introduced, and the US has ratified the Paris Agreement despite temporarily withdrawing. In 2021, the country set a target of halving its annual greenhouse gas emissions by 2030, however oil and gas companies still get tax breaks.

Climate change is having considerable impacts on the environment and society of the United States. This includes implications for agriculture, the economy (especially the affordability and availability of insurance), human health, and indigenous peoples, and it is seen as a national security threat. US States that emit more carbon dioxide per person and introduce policies to oppose climate action are generally experiencing greater impacts. 2020 was a historic year for billion-dollar weather and climate disasters in U.S. In 2024, the United States experienced 27 separate weather and climate disasters, each causing over $1 billion in damages, in total, it caused $27 billion in damages. This set a record for the most billion dollars disasters in a single year.

Although historically a non-partisan issue, climate change has become controversial and politically divisive in the country in recent decades. Oil companies have known since the 1970s that burning oil and gas could cause global warming but nevertheless funded deniers for years. Despite the support of a clear scientific consensus, as recently as 2021 one-third of Americans deny that human-caused climate change exists although the majority are concerned or alarmed about the issue.

=== Acid deposition ===
Acid deposition, in the form of acid rain and dry deposition, is the result of sulfur dioxide and nitrogen oxides being emitted into the air, traveling and landing in a different place, and changing the acidity of the water or land on which the chemicals fall. This process is largely caused by the burning of fossil fuels, but a small amount can be traced back to natural sources like volcanoes. Acid deposition in the Northeast United States from the burning of coal and in the West United States from utilities and motor vehicles caused a number of problems. The problem of acid rain was partially exacerbated by efforts of coal power plants to meet requirements of the Clean Air Act by building taller smoke stacks. This helped to limit acid deposition effects on local air quality, but resulted in farther transmission of these pollutants. Amendments to the Clean Air Act were added in 1977 to discourage this type of dispersion in favor of pollution control equipment.

During the Carter administration, the United States undertook a risk-averse policy, acting through the EPA and Council on Environmental Quality (CEQ) to research and control the pollutants suspected to cause acid deposition even in the face of scientific uncertainty. The Reagan administration was more risk tolerant. It argued that, given the scientific uncertainties about harm and exposure levels, new expenditures should not be undertaken that would curtail energy security and economic growth. During George H. W. Bush's presidential campaign, he called for new Clean Air Act legislation to curtail sulfur- and nitrogen-dioxide emissions. In 1990, after he was elected, amendments to the Clean Air Act were finally passed that cut emissions by over 12 million tons per year, set up a market-like system of emissions trading, and set a cap on emissions for the year 2000. These goals were achieved to some degree by the installation of industrial scrubbers.

While the initial costs in cutting emissions levels were expected to be over $4.6 billion for utilities and a 40% rise in electricity costs, the impact ended up being only about $1 billion and a 2–4% rise in electricity costs. Part of the reason for the relatively low costs is the availability of low-sulfur coal.

=== Ozone depletion ===
Ozone depletion is the reduced concentration of ozone in the Earth's stratosphere (called the ozone layer), where it serves to block much of the ultraviolet radiation from the Sun. Chlorofluorocarbons (CFCs), which were used beginning in the 1930s in a number of important areas, were determined in 1974 to be responsible for much of the depletion of the ozone layer. Four years later, the EPA and FDA banned CFCs in aerosol cans. As research in the 1980s indicated that the problem was worse than before, and revealed a controversial massive hole in the ozone layer over Antarctica, three international agreements were made to reduce the ozone-damaging substances- the Vienna Convention, the 1987 Montreal Protocol, and a third agreement in 1990 in London. In the United States, the 1990 Clean Air Act Amendments phased out production of CFCs and required recycling of CFC products.

Although the phase-out of CFCs took almost two decades, the policy is generally seen as a success. While a crisis seems to be averted, due to the longevity of CFC particles in the atmosphere, the ozone layer is only expected to start showing sign of recovery by 2024.

=== Hazardous wastes ===
Hazardous waste regulations began in the United States in 1976 with the Resource Conservation and Recovery Act (RCRA) to govern hazardous waste from its initial generation to final disposition (cradle-to-grave regulation) and the Toxic Substances Control Act (TSCA) to anticipate possible hazards from chemicals. Following the events at Love Canal, the Comprehensive Environmental Response, Compensation, and Liability Act (CERCLA, or Superfund) was enacted in 1980 to assist in the cleanup of abandoned hazardous waste disposal sites. In the mid-1980s, the Hazardous and Solid Waste Amendments (1984) and the Superfund Amendments and Reauthorization Act (1986) were passed.

The aim of hazardous waste regulation is to prevent harm from occurring due to hazardous waste and to pass the burdens of cleanup of hazardous waste on to the original producers of the waste. Some of the problems of hazardous waste regulation are that the negative effects of hazardous waste can be difficult to detect and controversial and that, due mainly to the large amount of hazardous waste that is generated (214 million tons in 1995), regulation can be difficult and costly.

Implementation has been difficult, with years sometimes passing between legislation passage and initial regulations. Superfund was passed in December 1980, just before Reagan took office. The first administrator of Superfund was Rita Lavelle who had worked for a major hazardous waste generator. The result was that her implementation of Superfund was designed mainly to delay regulation, and the subsequent controversy resulted in the resignation of Lavelle, EPA administrator Anne Burford, and several other top EPA personnel. In 1986, Congress passed the Superfund Amendments and Reauthorization Act, increasing funding to $9 billion and providing for studies and new technologies. By 1995, Superfund cleanup still took an average of twelve years per site, and costs for each site can range in the billions of dollars. Superfund, while showing improvements, has been probably the most criticized of environmental programs based on costs of remediation, implementation problems, and the questionable seriousness of the problems it addresses.

=== Risk control policy ===
Underlying the policy decisions made by the United States is the concept of risk control, consisting of two parts: risk assessment and risk management. The science behind risk assessment varies greatly in uncertainty and tends to be the focus of political controversy. For example, animal testing is often used to determine the toxicity of various substances for humans. But assumptions made about expected dosage and exposure to chemicals are often disputed, and the dosage given to animals is typically much larger than what humans normally consume. While industry groups tend to take a risk-tolerant position, environmentalists take a risk-averse position, following the precautionary principle.

Another issue is the effect that chemicals can have relative to lifestyle choices. Cancer, for example, typically surface decades after first exposure to a carcinogen, and lifestyle choices are frequently more important in causing cancer than exposure to chemicals. While the governmental role in mitigating lifestyle-choice risks can be very controversial (see Smoking in the United States), chemical exposure through lifestyle choices can also occur involuntarily if the public is not properly educated (see Endocrine disruptors).

Finally, the way that threats are presented to the public plays a large role in how those threats are addressed. The threat of nuclear power and the environmental effects of pesticides are overstated, some have claimed, while many high-priority threats go unpublicized. In order to combat this discrepancy, the EPA published a Relative Risk Report in 1987, and a follow-up report published by the Relative Risk Reduction Strategies Committee in 1990 suggested that the EPA should adopt a more pro-active posture, educating the public and assigning budgetary priorities for objectively assessed high-risk threats.

== Impact ==
Since the major environmental legislation of the 1970s was enacted, great progress has been made in some areas, but the environmental protection has come at a high price. Between 1970 and 1996, air pollutants dropped 32% while the population grew by 29%. Other pollutants have been more difficult to track, especially water pollutants. While air and water standards have been slowly improving, in 1996 70 million people still lived in counties that did not meet EPA ozone standards. 36% of rivers and 39% of lakes did not meet minimum standards for all uses (swimming, fishing, drinking, supporting aquatic life). In the same period, the size of the National Park Service grew from 26,000,000 acres (110,000 km^{2}) to 83,000,000 acres (340,000 km^{2}), and the U.S. Fish and Wildlife Service expanded by over three times to manage over 92,000,000 acres (370,000 km^{2}). In 1995, 41% of the 960 endangered species were stable or improving.

Critics of environmental legislation argue that the gains made in environmental protection come at too great a cost. A 2003 paper estimated the overall cost of environmental regulation in the United States to be about 2% of the gross domestic product. While this cost resembles that of many other countries, calculating it is challenging both conceptually (deciding what costs are included) and practically (with data from a broad range of sources). In 1994, almost $122 billion was spent on pollution abatement and control. $35 billion of that has been in direct government spending, $65 billion was spent by business, and $22 billion was spent by individuals.

== See also ==
- Environmental history of the United States
- Environmental Racism in the United States
- Climate change policy of the United States
- Climate change and agriculture in the United States
- Foreign policy of the Obama administration regarding Climate change
- Green New Deal
- List of environmental agencies in the United States
- List of United States federal environmental statutes
- List of environmental organizations
