= Criticisms of globalization =

Skepticism of the claimed benefits of globalization

Criticism of globalization is skepticism of the claimed benefits of globalization. Many of these views are held by the anti-globalization movement. Globalization has created much global and internal unrest in many countries. Case studies of Thailand and the Arab nations' view of globalization show that globalization may be a threat to culture and religion, and it may harm indigenous people groups while multinational corporations would profit from it. Although globalization improved the global standard of living and economic development, it has been criticized for its production of negative effects. Globalization is not simply an economic project, but it also influences a country environmentally, politically, and socially as well.

== Economic impacts ==
There is a debate over how globalization affects employment. There is less domestic manufacture of everyday products as a result of globalization. When buyers search for a product, they will usually choose the least expensive option. In affluent countries, local goods are disadvantaged competing with the cheaper prices of goods manufactured abroad.

It was estimated in 2013 that the Chinese import competition as well as American corporations offshoring led to a loss of employment for 548,000 US workers between 1990 and 2000.

== Political impacts ==
=== Globalization as American hegemony ===
According to Lisandro E. Claudio, resistance against American hegemony was seen during the Cold War through the Third World or non-aligned movement that resisted Soviet Communism in addition to American hegemony.

According to English Philosopher John Gray, they described globalization as post-Cold War American triumphalism, and stated "global laissez-faire is an American project". Gray argues that the American system of Globalization is past its prime and is no longer sustainable in the modern world. Globalization in the United States began with the common goal of forming a global collective that facilitates a steady stream of trade, internationalism, and collaboration in various sectors to promote peace and prosperity. Some scholars and critics say the Washington Consensus played a role in solidifying the United States as one of the core nation-states as one of the most significant contributors towards promoting global capitalism in the post-Cold War era.

According to Sanjib Baruah, he criticizes U.S.-led globalism as exporting American hegemony that benefits an English-speaking population at the expense of indigenous populations in developing countries. While speaking at the U.N. General Assembly in 2022, United States President Donald Trump challenges this belief by stating that America had lost its former high regard and that globalism caused his country to bear a disproportionate amount of expenses in international initiatives. According to a survey conducted by the Pew Research Center, many citizens in Britain and America have a feeling of being forgotten or swept up by globalization and its lasting effects. The survey also reveals these feelings were influenced by the rising cost of living, culture shifts, industry decline, and the rising influence of American multinational corporations.

=== Power of corporations ===
Globalization offers benefits for multinational corporations. Domestic and minority groups within nations opting towards globalization may be threatened by the growing power of multinational corporations. For example, this is exemplified with large palm oil companies receiving land to develop from the government that is occupied by the indigenous tribes. According to Jonathan Robins, the experiences of indigenous inhabitants within the palm oil industry had similar experiences where foreign influences caused local governments to push for the promotion and profitability of the commodity with the backing of international economies, consequentially marginalizing locals previously occupying or owning the newly sold off concessions of land. Globalization has been criticized for benefiting those who are already large and in power at the cost of endangering the countries’ indigenous population. In the name of free markets and with the promise of an improved standard of living, local authorities give up some of their political and social powers to international organizations. According to Tara Zahra, countries viewed international intervention from the League of Nations as the encroachment of their sovereignty. Globalization has empowered international organizations while diminishing the influence of domestic and local institutions.

== Environmental impacts ==
=== Case study of Thailand’s Pak Mun River ===
In the late 1970s and 1980s, hydropower dam projects were conducted in order to recreate Thailand's economy into an export-oriented economy. The projects were funded by loans from the World Bank and was part of globalization efforts. Local villagers whom the project would directly affect were not notified, and the World Bank disregarded their concerns. As a result of the building of the dams, villages that heavily depended on the river lost their livelihood and their means of economic gains (i.e., fishing). The projects contaminated the river, which made the river unfit for villagers to drink, bathe, and do laundry without experiencing negative health conditions such as rashes. Furthermore, the projects resulted in the extermination from the region of 40 edible plant species, 45 mushroom species, and 10 bamboo species, all of which the income of the local markets were dependent on, some of which were important for medical usage. The decline in fish population exterminated fishermen's ways of life, as 169 different fish species were affected and 56 species became totally extinct from the local ecosystem. The globalization efforts in Thailand resulted in environmental impacts that affected the social and economic welfare of indigenous populations.

=== Decreased biodiversity ===
The decrease in biodiversity worldwide is an effect of human activity; human impact on ecosystems can be measured by biological diversity. Harmful effects from globalization are visible from reduced genetic diversity in agriculture from the loss of crop varieties and livestock breeds, loss of biological species, increase of "exotic species" which live outside their natural geographic range, pollution in Earth's natural elements such as air, water, soil, rapid climate change, exhaustion of resources, and social or spiritual disruption.

According to David Ehrenfeld, agricultural effects have been documented for all food plants from vegetables, grains, and tree tops. Since 1970, over a thousand independent seed companies have been purchased by pharmaceutical, petrochemical, and other transnational corporations. As transnationals drop all but the profitable seed varieties there is a significant loss of germ plasm. The Garden Seed Inventory has listed all commercially available, non-hybrid vegetable varieties in the United States and Canada, and shows that beet roots, cabbage, and broccoli will diminish as a result of globalization faster than per capita income increases.

One example of the loss of domestic livestock due to globalization includes the near-extinction of the Creole pig. They were nearly killed off due to a disease control effort to "integrate Haiti into the hemispheric economy." There were efforts to try replacing the pigs with those from Iowa from the United States, but the costly project was a failure since the pigs needs could not be met, leading to Haiti suffering a US$600 million loss.

=== Threats to animal livelihood ===
Extinction rates in the 20th and 21st century have far exceeded the historical norm evolutionary history. In the second half of the 20th century and the beginning of the 21st, global trade and expansion was growing rapidly; however, this has been accompanied by a loss of species comparable to the great extinctions of early geological times. The United Nations Food and Agriculture Organization (FAO) warns that corporations have prioritized high-output breeds over gene pools that could ensure future food security; about 20 percent of domestic animals are near-extinction, with a breed lost each month. Of the 7,600 FAO breeds logged in the farm animal genetics resources, 190 have gone extinct in the past 15 years with another 1,500 species at risk of extinction. According to the FAO, globalization of livestock markets is the single most important factor contributing to the decline of farm animal genetic diversity

The factors resulting in habitat destruction can be narrowed down to: exploitations of populations and natural areas for production or trade, increased housing, agriculture, over-fishing, road building, mining, and dam construction. There are also subtle effects of globalization on wild species, expansions of ecotourism-based industries, changes in land-use practice, and competition for resources has increased contact between wildlife and humans. It has also introduced human-pathogens to wild species such as Mycobacterium tuberculosis in mongooses of Botswana. The resulting mortality in mongooses has been near-extinction threatening.

=== Increased emissions ===
Globalization is criticized for its role in increasing carbon dioxide emissions. According to Robert B. Marks, the period known as the Anthropocene has linked increased economic activity correlating with increased emissions impacting the natural environment. According to a 2001 study, a relationship was linked between economic globalization and open trade leads to increases in energy consumption and CO_{2} emissions that impacts the environment. International trade relies on various means of transportation including trains, motorized vehicles, planes, boats, and ships, each emitting a large quantity of emissions. The relationship of global trade and the consumption of fuel contribute to CO_{2} emissions in the atmosphere. According to a 2022 study, the transportation sector in the United States emits 1.9 billion tons of CO_{2} annually, connecting the proliferation of global trade to increase the impact of greenhouse gasses on the atmosphere. The further a good travels, more fuel is burned in its contributions towards releasing CO_{2}. These CO_{2} emissions contribute to climate change, ocean acidification, and decreased biodiversity.

Moreover, the good being traded is created using electricity and intermediate goods, which are oftentimes products from international trading. In 2018, countries under the Regional Comprehensive Economic Partnership (China, South Korea, Australia, New Zealand, and ten countries of ASEAN) accounted for 39.1% of global CO_{2} emissions. Through globalization, trade partnerships have been created to facilitate easy international trade for intermediate goods. This ease allows for more goods to be traded internationally for a cheaper export price, encouraging foreign countries to continue transporting goods, and thus increasing CO_{2} emissions.

=== Invasive species ===
Globalization intensifies the spread of invasive species through the increase of trade transportation. Today, the development of trading has open trade routes and markets across the globe. The increased methods of transportation allows living organisms to latch on to the shipping containers and travel to a new location where it can grow invasive without the checks and balances present in its natural environment. Rising volumes of air and ship transport are identified as the main source of marine invasions.

=== Decreased renewable resources ===
Globalization promotes the transportation of materials from one country to another, allowing more finite resources to be used up. The need for coal in the world is seen through the trade and transportation of the material across the globe. Coal is most desired due to its cheap extraction price, local availability, and necessity in basic items such as steel, concrete, and electricity. In fact, 23% of all electricity in the United States is generated by coal, demonstrating reliance on the resource.

China joined the world trade organization in December 2001 with an average of 2.5 billion tons of coal being supplied each year, and by 2011, their coal usage nearly doubled to 4 billion metric tons. Further examples of increased coal usage due to international trading include India, the United States, and Indonesia. However, coal is not an infinite source of energy. The U.S Energy Information Administration (EIA) estimated in 2020 that the recoverable coal reserves will last 470 years, and the coal produced from mines will last 25 years. As a result of globalization, more resources are being used up in a faster period of time, which will eventually lead to the demise of resources.

== Social impacts ==
=== Prejudice ===
Professor Conor Gearty, of the London School of Economics, has suggested that global freedom of movement, brought on by globalisation, has increased the scope for prejudice within societies.

=== Education ===
Globalization creates an incentive for nations to produce individuals who are competitive and marketable. In many countries, educational policy and administration has shifted to emphasize efficiency and marketability instead of traditional 'soft' skills. Education is being restructured on market principles - thus, in the realm of higher education, knowledge production and dissemination is becoming commodified. As knowledge management is coming to outweigh labour on the global stage, there is an increasing prevalence of neoliberal economic ideologies. A direct result of this change is the mass privatization of institutions of higher education. Because of privatization and corporatization, public universities are coming to run like for-profit businesses. Thus, universities must find alternative sources of funding, leading to a reliance on the market. Though globalization has increased access to education, in many places it has also made it more unequal in quality.

== Psychological impacts ==
=== Identity ===
The collision between global and local cultures has created challenges in adapting to and reconciling the two. Globalization and the introduction of the Western culture in different countries have shown to produce bicultural identities, identity confusion, and self-selected cultures.

Bicultural identity is defined as one adapting to the global culture while simultaneously being familiar with local traditions. As a result, two identities are formed: global identity and local identity. One's global identity allows one to participate and succeed globally by being able to relate to those outside of one's local sphere. One's local identity allows one to still be relevant to family and friends nearby. Often, those experiencing globalization in their country are seen to develop a hybrid identity in which their global and local identities are merged. This can also be seen with immigrants.

However, adapting to both cultures may be difficult, especially if the distance between the two cultures is great. In these cases, globalization may cause identity confusion, preventing the proper development of identity and self (Erikson's theory of identity formation). Similarly, globalization may create a crisis which John Berry calls marginalization, in which one is unable to identify with local culture due to the heavy exposure of globalization and Western influences; however one is also excluded from the global culture as well.

The implementation of globalization requires a certain degree of culture shedding, as global culture alters and disrupts the pre-existing local culture. This also leads to identity confusion, primarily in adolescents.

== Cultural impacts ==
=== Urban and adolescent issues ===
Globalization claims to have improved countries’ global status. However, companies attempting to compete globally have exploited workers, and global competition has been achieved through poor working conditions. An increase in juvenile crimes is also attributed to the disruption of traditional norms.

=== Arab and Muslim countries ===
While many Muslims welcome globalization, many other Muslims see globalism to be imperialistic and a cultural invasion that attempts to destroy their heritage and cultural beliefs.

Despite the differing opinions of globalization, there is wide consensus among Arab authors that globalism is Americanism— the implementation of American cultures and ideals into other countries.

Globalization is especially threatening to Arab nations because Islam is not simply a religious practice, but it dominates laws and social norms such as marriages and spending habits. Since globalization is seen to be a way of secularizing a nation, Muslims also see it as a cultural and religious invasion, requiring the separation of religion and daily life. Radicalists see it as a perversion of pure Islamic doctrine, as globalization is seen to merge the domain of Islam (Dar al-Islam) and the domain of infidelity (Dar-al-Kufr).

The Western control of media is viewed by many Arab authors as a way to brainwash young Muslims to strip them of their nationality and cultural heritage. Some opponents of globalisation oppose the alleged creation of a new, global, hegemonic culture, referencing Quran 49:13 which states that God has purposefully divided mankind into different nations and tribes. Arab intellectuals have stated that globalization rids the earth of human cultural diversity and civilizations’ peculiarities. Authors and publishers have expressed fear of Western ideals penetrating their nations.

=== Language death ===
Globalization has been identified as one of the main factors behind language death. Globalization forces languages into unequal interactions with each other where languages of developing countries with many speakers dominate those with fewer speakers and of developing or undeveloped areas. Speakers of minority languages are pressured economically and socially to abandon their languages in favour of global ones such as English, which results in decline and eventual disappearance of minority languages.

Globalization drives nations to adopt monolingual practices and pressure speakers of minority or marginalized languages to speak the majority language instead. Because globalization entails dominant cultural groups imposing their ways of social, economic and political organization on weaker cultures, Salikoko Mufwene considers it a product of colonization.

== See also ==
- Criticism of capitalism
- Criticism of neoliberalism
- Criticism of the International Monetary Fund
- Criticism of the World Bank
- Criticism of the World Trade Organization
- Development criticism
- Disneyfication
- Global labor arbitrage
- Nationalism
- New World Order (conspiracy theory)
- New world order (politics)
- Westernization
- Social stratification
- Societal collapse
