= GETS =

GETS or Gets may refer to:

- Global Environment and Trade Study
- Government Emergency Telecommunications Service
- GE Transportation Systems
- Garrett-Evangelical Theological Seminary
- Members of several Thracian tribes otherwise known collectively as the Getae.
- gets(), a computer programming function that reads a line of input
- Getae or Gets, several Thracian tribes
