= The Art of Investing in America =

The Art of Investing in America: Secrets to Success
- Book cover
- Author: Dennis Unkovic
- Original title: 在美国投资的艺术: 成功秘诀
- Genre: Non-Fiction
- Publisher: Metallurgical Industry Press
- Publication date: 2009
- Publication place: United States
- Media type: Print (Paperback)
- Pages: 270
- ISBN: 978-7502448578
- OCLC: 458422940
- Dewey Decimal: 332.6730973
- LC Class: HG4910.U55

The Art of Investing in America: Secrets to Success is the sixth book written by Dennis Unkovic.

The Art of Investing in America was published in March 2009 by the Metallurgical Industry Press in Beijing, China. The focus of this book is to provide insight to those Chinese business executives and government officials who are evaluating opportunities to make investments that could ultimately benefit the United States as well as China.

== Structure ==
The Art of Investing in an America is written in the form of a "how-to" primer for Chinese investors planning acquisitions in the United States. Fifteen chapters cover topics related to the American business climate, procedures, laws and systems in a FAQ style. Within each chapter, the subject matter is broken down in a format designed to address the questions Chinese investors are likely to have about each topic (and some they may not have thought of). The topics progress to create a step-by-step guide.

=== Topics ===
- 1. Why Chinese Investors – After the Meltdown – Should Read This Book
- 2. Understanding Cultural Differences Between China and the United States
- 3. Key Facts You Should Know About America
- 4. Introduction to the United States Legal System
- 5. Managing U.S. Investments and Operations
- 6. Joint Ventures in America and Negotiating a Successful Joint Venture Agreement
- 7. Five Business Structures Used by Foreign Investors in America
- 8. United States Immigration Laws
- 9. Workers and Labor Unions
- 10. Patents, Copyrights, Trademarks, and Trade Secrets in America
- 11. United States Real Estate Law
- 12. Environmental Laws in the United States
- 13. Three United States Laws Foreign Investors Must Understand
- 14. United States Lobbying Laws
- 15. The 10 Most Important Lessons for Investors in America

== Language ==
The Art of Investing in America is printed in a dual-language format, with the Chinese text appearing in the first half of the book followed by the English text. A table of contents is provided in both languages.

Unkovic's style of writing is strictly informative and the language used to discuss the topic of foreign investments is explanatory. The content is a mixture of facts, personal opinions and observations.

== Theme ==
Unkovic outwardly states that his intent in The Art of Investing in America is to guide Chinese investors toward successful acquisitions in the United States by concisely presenting the basics of what they need to know about commercial transactions and business procedures in America.

In the first chapter titled "Why Chinese Investors -- After the Meltdown --Should Read This Book," Unkovic addresses potential concerns about whether the economic climate is still favorable for investments after the recent financial crisis and the current opportunities available. He then proceeds in chapters such as "Understanding Cultural Differences Between China and the United States" and "Introduction to the United States Legal System" to give an overview of the fundamentals of U.S. business transactions. Chapters such as "Workers and Labor Unions" and "Patents, Copyrights, Trademarks and Trade Secrets in America" discuss legal issues Chinese investors would potentially face in business acquisitions. The book concludes with "The 10 Most Important Lessons for Investors in America," a condensed review of Unkovic's advice for successful American acquisitions by Chinese investors.
