= Climate change and agriculture in the United States =

Climate change's effects on agriculture in the United States

Climate change and agriculture are complexly related processes. In the United States, agriculture is the second largest emitter of greenhouse gases (GHG), behind the energy sector. Direct GHG emissions from the agricultural sector account for 8.4% of total U.S. emissions, but the loss of soil organic carbon through soil erosion indirectly contributes to emissions as well. While agriculture plays a role in propelling climate change, it is also affected by the direct (increase in temperature, change in rainfall, flooding, drought) and secondary (weed, pest, disease pressure, infrastructure damage) consequences of climate change. The United States Department of Agriculture (USDA) is a regulatory, research, and support body in American agriculture. They work to understanding the impact of climate change on farming and to helping American farmers adapt. USDA research indicates that these climatic changes will lead to a decline in yield and nutrient density in key crops, as well as decreased livestock productivity. Climate change poses unprecedented challenges to U.S. agriculture due to the sensitivity of agricultural productivity and costs to changing climate conditions. Rural communities dependent on agriculture are particularly vulnerable to climate change threats. Native communities are also vulnerable, and the Intertribal Agricultural Council (IAC) documents, supports, and advocates for the reintegrative practices of Native American and Alaskan agricultural producers. The IAC is particularly focused on the economic impact and potential of regenerative farming practices for native people.

The US Global Change Research Program (2017) identified four key areas of concern in the agriculture sector: reduced productivity, degradation of resources, health challenges for people and livestock, and the adaptive capacity of agriculture communities.

Large-scale adaptation and mitigation of these threats relies on changes in farming policy.

== Livestock and crop production systems ==
Projections for crops and livestock production systems reveal that climate change effects over the next 25 years will be mixed. The continued degree of change in the climate by midcentury and beyond is expected to have overall detrimental effects on most crops and livestock. Climate change will exacerbate current biotic stresses on agricultural plants and animals. Increases of atmospheric carbon dioxide (CO_{2}), rising temperatures, and altered precipitation patterns will affect agricultural productivity. Increases in temperature coupled with more variable precipitation will reduce productivity of crops, and these effects will outweigh the benefits of increasing carbon dioxide. Effects will vary among annual and perennial crops, and regions of the United States; however, all production systems will be affected to some degree by climate change.

Livestock production systems are vulnerable to temperature stresses. An animal's ability to adjust its metabolic rate to cope with temperature extremes can lead to reduced productivity and in extreme cases death. Prolonged exposure to extreme temperatures will also further increase production costs and productivity losses associated with all animal products, e.g., meat, eggs, and milk. Grazing lands used for rearing livestock are under increased threats of wildfire.

Soil carbon will be depleted during droughts, depriving crops of an essential element of productivity. In 2012, the US experienced a drought that greatly reduced yield of key crops and livestock in the Great Plans and Midwest region. Average yields of commodity crops (corn, soybean, rice) will decline due to the increased temperature whereas other crops (wheat, hay) could potentially increase yield due to anticipated rainfall in certain regions. Effects on horticulture crops will be variable.

The Southwest region of the United States is one of the hottest and driest regions in the country. Farmers have identified surface and groundwater shortages as being the cause of diminished crop yields. Climate models indicate the likelihood of a decade-scale drought is incredibly high, posing unprecedented stress to the agro-ecosystem.

== Weeds, diseases, pests and pollinators ==
Changing pressures associated with weeds, diseases, and insect pests, together with potential changes in timing and coincidence of pollinator lifecycles, will affect growth and yields. The potential magnitude of these effects is not yet well understood. For example, while some pest insects will thrive under increasing air temperatures, warming temperatures may force others out of their current geographical ranges. Increased global temperature in similar landscapes restricts agricultural opportunities for sustainable pollination patterns, decreases agricultural movement into habitable areas, and reduces climate buffering during environmental threats. Several weeds have shown a greater response to carbon dioxide relative to crops; understanding these physiological and genetic responses may help guide future enhancements to weed management.

== Soil and water impacts ==
Agriculture is dependent on a wide range of ecosystem processes that support productivity including maintenance of soil quality and regulation of water quality and quantity. Multiple stressors, including climate change, increasingly compromise the ability of ecosystems to provide these services.

Key near-term climate change effects on agricultural soil and water resources include the potential for increased soil erosion through extreme precipitation events, as well as regional and seasonal changes in the availability of water resources for both rain-fed and irrigated agriculture. Agricultural systems depend upon reliable water sources, and the pattern and potential magnitude of precipitation changes is not well understood, thus adding considerable uncertainty to assessment efforts.

A regional climate model estimated that California will experience increased heavy precipitation events and change in the form of precipitation (predominantly rain as opposed to snow). Changes in the water management system will be essential for preventing water scarcity and reducing stress on the agricultural system.

== Extreme weather ==
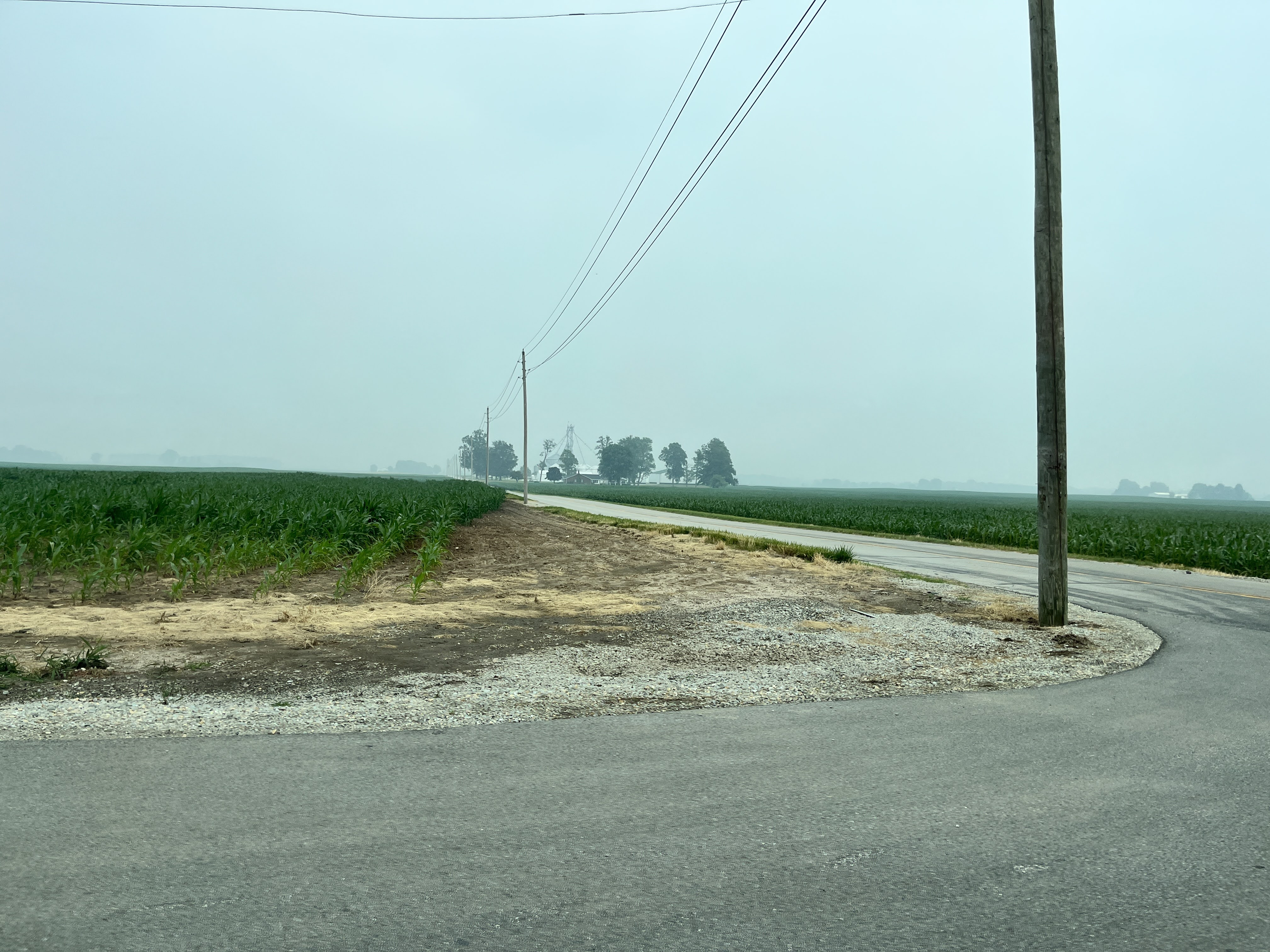
Smoke from wildfires in Canada resulted in lowered air quality and visibility in Cicero, Indiana in June of 2023.

The predicted higher incidence of extreme weather events will have an increasing influence on agricultural productivity. Extremes matter because agricultural productivity is driven largely by environmental conditions during critical threshold periods of crop and livestock development. Improved assessment of climate change effects on agricultural productivity requires greater integration of extreme events into crop and economic models.

Changes in precipitation patterns can cause dry periods to lengthen and rain to become heavier, even in the same area. On one hand, there is an increase in flooding, which can destroy crops and livestock, pollute water, and damage infrastructure. On the other hand, drought can impact the water supply and increase the risk of wildfires.

== Human actions on agricultural vulnerability ==
Comprehensive, preventative measures and the implementation of regenerative practices by farmers and producers can greatly reduce the vulnerability of agriculture to climatic change.

As certain crops and breeds of livestock become less productive and viable due to climate change induced shifts in weather patterns and nutrient availability, farmers must find more resilient alternatives, capable of adaption to temperature changes and water availability. This means farmers are obliged to make new investments and learn new practices to ensure their properties and operations remain profitable and productive. And as the farmers are coping with the new transformations, they are also facing new threats in the form of new and more dangerous diseases, pets, insects.

== Role of the US Department of Agriculture ==
The US Department of Agriculture (USDA) is the federal office that regulates, monitors, and supports agricultural activity in the United States and manages food stamp and child nutrition programs. They have offices across the U.S. and aim to promote American agrarian activity, rural development, and natural resource conservation. Climate change is one of their areas of interest. They try to find innovative solutions to climate-change induced problems in the agricultural industry and rural communities.

The USDA is also responsible for implementing many of the programs outlined within the Farm Bill. The Farm Bill designates spending in key areas of agriculture. It has been reviewed and renewed in some form approximately every five years since 1933. Sustainability and conservation are often two key categories of the bill. The current farm bill funds programs like the Conservation Reserve Program (CRP), Regional Conservation Partnership Program (RCPP), Conservation Stewardship Program (CSP), and Conservation Innovation Grants (CIG). These programs assist farmers looking to switch to more sustainable production methods. The current bill in effect was signed in 2018, and a new version was delayed until 2025 due to disagreements on overall spending, SNAP cuts, crop subsidies, and Federal crop insurance.

The USDA lists land conservation as one of their key focuses for sustainability. As of early 2025, their programs particularly target the preservation of privately owned lands to decrease their environmental impacts while increasing the land's productivity. One prominent program on this topic is the Conservation Innovation Grants (CIG) program. The CIG program awards yearly funds to organizations around the country for the development of new solutions that advance the conservation of private lands.

The USDA also directs much of the federally funded agricultural research in the US. The "USDA Science Blueprint", released in February 2020, is a road map for the research that the USDA believes is needed to help the agricultural industry adapt to climate change. Cuts to USDA's scientific funding and the loss of research capacity due to the Economic Research Service (ERS) and the National Institute of Food and Agriculture (NIFA) being moved away from the Washington D.C. region during the first Trump Administration, raised some concerns regarding the USDA's continued ability to conduct this proposed research.

== Role of the Intertribal Agricultural Council ==
The Intertribal Agricultural Council (IAC) has worked since 1987 to conserve and develop Indigenous agricultural resources and practices. They work with and represent 574 tribes in the continental US and Alaska. The IAC has numerous programs to improve the lives and farming endeavors of Native Americans on and off reservations, and they collaborate with the USDA to represent native farmers and assist native farmers in accessing USDA resources. One of their main focuses is improving and expanding regenerative agriculture and conservation efforts while respecting traditional Native American farming practices through programs like the "574+ Strong" program.

The IAC runs several programs that study regenerative agriculture practices and the financial implications of sustainable agriculture practices for Native Americans on native lands. One such program was a three-year project with the Environmental Defense Fund (EDF) to study regenerative farming practices of Indigenous farmers and their economic viability and impacts. This large-scale project included staff from the IAC and the EDF, instructors from Minnesota State's Farm Business Management (FBM) program, and native producers who were in the process of or considering implementing regenerative practices. It examined native farmers and producers' business choices and financial opportunities to find benefits to transitions to more regenerative and sustainable practices as well as patterns in barriers to accessing the resources and support needed for those transitions.

== See also ==
- Climate change in the United States
