= Competitiveness Policy Council =

The Competitiveness Policy Council was an independent federal advisory committee chartered in 1988 to advise the president and the Congress on more effective policies to promote U.S. competitiveness. The council had a unique quadrapartite membership composed of representatives from business, labor, government, and the public.

The council began operation in 1991, and ceased operation in 1997 after the Republican-led Congress failed to continue funding, and after council members decided to close out this successful experiment in the independent advisory function.

== Authority ==
Authority for the council is found in the Competitiveness Policy Council Act, 15 U.S.C. §4801 et seq. This act was part of the larger Omnibus Trade and Competitiveness Act of 1988. The authorization of appropriations for the council expired in Fiscal year 1992, but otherwise the statutory underpinnings for the council remain intact, and the council could be revived by a future president with a pro-competitive agenda.

== Notable accomplishments ==
During its years in operation, the Competitiveness Policy Council prepared and issued four Reports to the President and Congress. They were:

- Building a Competitive America (1992)
- A Competitiveness Strategy for America (1993)
- Promoting Long-Term Prosperity (1994)
- Saving More and Investing Better (1995)

The council adopted a broad approach to American competitiveness defining it as the ability of the United States to produce goods and services that meet the test of international markets while its citizens earn a standard of living that is both rising and sustainable over the long run. This definition differed from others in that era which emphasized the trade balance rather than the overall impact of governmental policies on national economic prosperity. The council's first report, "Building a Competitive America" (March 1992) explained that "three elements permeate our society and most directly hurt our competitive position: short-termism, perverse incentives, and absence of global thinking."

To help analyze the problems of faltering U.S. competitiveness, the council in its first year, established eight subcouncils to study and recommend solutions for the most critical problems hindering U.S. competitiveness. These subcouncils were: capital formation, education, training, public infrastructure, corporate governance and financial markets, trade policy, manufacturing, and critical technologies. Additional subcouncils were established in later years.

== Leadership, composition, and appointments ==
The council was led by Dr. C. Fred Bergsten, then the Director of the Institute for International Economics (now the Peterson Institute). Chairman Bergsten was elected by nongovernmental Council members at the first meeting. The council was composed of 12 members who were appointed through a well-crafted process dictated by statute that provided for quadrapartite and bipartisan representation. Specifically, there were three members from the business community, three from organized labor, three from federal or state government, and three from academia and public interest. Four members were appointed by the president, four by the Speaker of the U.S. House of Representatives and the Minority Leader acting jointly, and four by the Majority and Minority leaders of the U.S. Senate acting jointly.

Both Presidents George H. W. Bush and Bill Clinton made appointments. The appointments process for the council was unusual, in providing for equal weight to representatives from business and labor.

Over its life, the members of the council and key staff included:

- Rand Araskog (ITT Corporation)
- John J. Barry (IBEW)
- Steve Charnovitz
- Donald V. Fites (Caterpillar, Inc.)
- Barbara Hackman Franklin
- Bill Graves
- John J. Murphy (Dresser Industries)
- Robert E. Nelson (Nelson Communications)
- Edward Regan
- Howard Rosen
- Richard Samans
- Claudine Schneider (former Member of Congress from Rhode Island)
- Bruce Scott (Harvard Business School)
- Albert Shanker
- Alexander B. Trowbridge
- Laura D. Tyson
- Edward Vetter (Vetter and Associates)
- Lynn R. Williams

== Charter ==
The council's statutory legislative charter contains a number of innovative administrative features. For example, one duty of the council is to create a "forum" where national leaders with experience could identify and development recommendations to address actual problems facing America. The council is empowered to hold hearings and to establish Subcouncils on any issue. An unusual provision of the CPC Act provides that any discussion at the Subcouncil shall not be considered to violate any Federal or state antitrust law.

The establishment of the Competitiveness Policy Council (CPC) was inspired, in part, by the favorable reception to the 1985 Report of the President's Commission on Industrial Competitiveness (chaired by John A. Young). A year following the Young Commission Report, a private sector Council on Competitiveness was set up, which remains in existence. The CPC developed a cooperative relationship with the Council on Competitiveness which enhanced the CPC's work product. The two Councils were easily distinguishable, however, in that the membership of the federally established CPC included a federal cabinet-level official and s state elected official. Thus, the deliberation of the CPC was able to benefit from the input of governmental members. By contrast, the private-sector Council on Competitiveness lacks governmental members.

== Important recommendations ==
The council made a number of important recommendations during its years of operation regarding pensions, education, public investment, trade negotiations, and many other issues. Some of the recommendations by the council were not adopted. For example, the council recommended an immediate implementation of the provision in federal law calling for the Executive Branch to attach a "competitiveness impact statement" to any new legislative proposal to the Congress which may affect U.S. competitiveness. This recommendation was not adopted. The council also championed the centrality of manufacturing in any national competitiveness strategy. The Obama Administration picked up on this recommendation in September 2009 when the President appointed the first White House counselor for manufacturing.

== Notable experts ==
Over a hundred individuals assisted the council's efforts by serving in the subcouncils.

Some of these experts included:

- Gerald L. Baliles
- Jeff Bingaman
- Erich Bloch
- Sherwood Boehlert
- Rick Boucher
- Richard C. Breeden
- Conrad Burns
- Pat Choate
- William F. Clinger, Jr.
- John M. Deutch
- William H. Donaldson
- Martin Feldstein
- Joseph T. Gorman
- William H. Gray
- Maurice R. Greenberg
- George Hatsopoulos
- Amo Houghton
- Herbert Kelleher
- John J. LaFalce
- Carl Levin
- Arthur Levitt
- Martin Lipton
- Trent Lott
- John D. Macomber
- Ray Marshall
- Ray Mabus
- Paul H. O'Neill
- Donald J. Pease
- Peter G. Peterson
- Michael Porter
- Robert Pozen
- Clyde V. Prestowitz Jr.
- Jay Rockefeller
- Felix Rohatyn
- Isabel Sawhill
- Kurt Schmoke
- Susan Schwab
- Lawrence Summers
- James R. Thompson
- Harold M. Williams

== Demise of the council ==
In April 1996, the U.S. Congress approved a $50,000 appropriation for the council, but also provided that "this shall be the final Federal payment to the Competitiveness Policy Council." In July 1996, a Report of the House Appropriations Committee withheld new funding for the council for FY1997, and noted that "the Committee believes that the Council is duplicative of private sector organizations, such as the Council on Competitiveness, which focus on the same issues without the use of Federal funds."
