= Steve Charnovitz =

American legal scholar, writer and teacher (1953–2025)

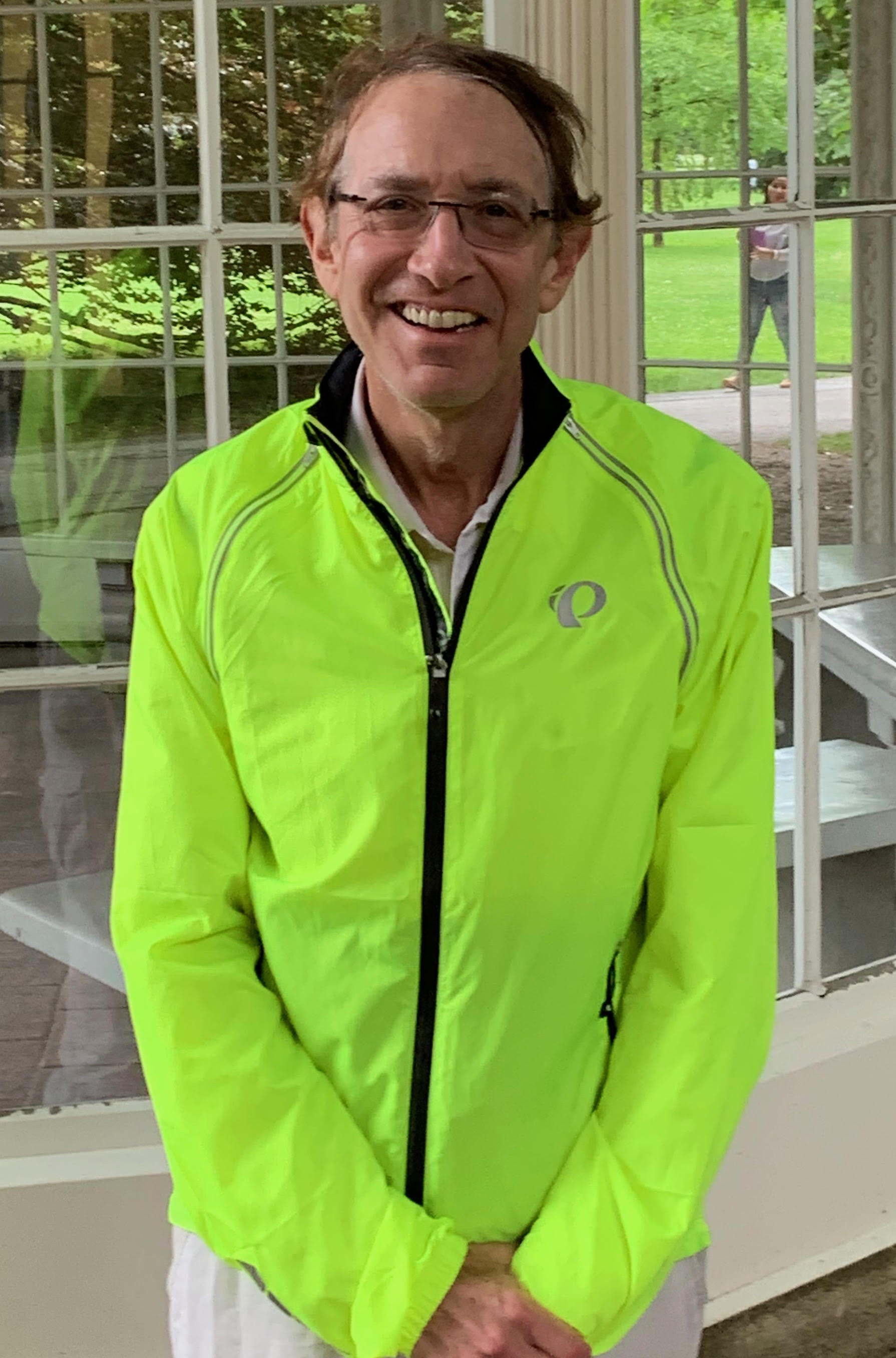
- Charnovitz in 2019
- Born: September 15, 1953; Savannah, Georgia, U.S.
- Died: March 23, 2025 (aged 71); New York City, U.S.
- Education: Yale University (BA, JD); Harvard Kennedy School (MPP)
- Scientific career
- Fields: International Law; International Trade
- Workplaces: George Washington University; George Washington University Law School

Steve Charnovitz (September 15, 1953 – March 23, 2025) was an American legal scholar who taught at the George Washington University Law School in Washington, D.C., and was best known for his writings on the linkages between trade and environment and trade and labor rights. He was also known for his scholarship on the historical role of nongovernmental organizations in international governance.

== Background ==
Charnovitz was a native of Savannah, Georgia.

He was an early advocate for improving bicycle transportation in the United States where he worked in the Office of Environmental Affairs of the U.S. Department of Transportation. He was an analyst in the U.S. Department of Labor from 1975 to 1986 on international labor issues. One accomplishment during that period was the negotiation of labor reforms in Haiti and El Salvador as part of the U.S. Caribbean Basin Initiative. During 1984–1985, he was an American Political Science Association Congressional Fellow in the offices of Senator Carl Levin and House Majority Leader Jim Wright. From 1987 to 1989, he was a legislative assistant to U.S. House of Representatives Speaker Jim Wright, and served once again in 1989–1991 for Speaker Tom Foley. In 1991, Charnovitz became Policy Director of the newly established Competitiveness Policy Council. In 1994, he co-founded and directed the Global Environment and Trade Study (GETS) located at the Yale Center for Environmental Law and Policy. After several years in private practice at the law firm now known as Wilmer Cutler Pickering Hale and Dorr, Charnovitz joined the faculty of the George Washington University Law School in 2004.

Charnovitz served on several editorial boards in scholarly journals including the American Journal of International Law, the Journal of Environment & Development, the Journal of International Economic Law, and the World Trade Review. He was a member of the Council on Foreign Relations. From the late 1970s onward, he was a forceful advocate of free trade combined with pro-competitiveness policies by governments to assist workers who are hurt by economic change and globalization. Charnovitz was also a longtime proponent of effective intergovernmental policies to prevent climate change. He was also an early proponent of giving each student an individual computer in the classroom.

He was a member of the American Law Institute. In 2012, he served as an advisor to the Harvard Business School's Project on U.S. Competitiveness.

Charnovitz received a B.A. degree from Yale College in 1975, an M.P.P. degree from Harvard Kennedy School in 1983, and a J.D. degree from Yale Law School in 1998. On March 23, 2025, he died in New York City at the age of 71.

== Works ==
Charnovitz was the author of Trade Law and Global Governance, which was launched in June 1992 at the Woodrow Wilson International Center for Scholars. He was also the author of over 215 articles in edited volumes and scholarly journals, and the co-editor of Law in Service of Human Dignity. In 2009, he coauthored Global Warming and the World Trading System, published by the Peterson Institute for International Economics. (The coauthors are Gary Clyde Hufbauer and Jisun Kim.) In the 1990s and 2000s, he had written extensively on the history of non-governmental organizations (NGOs). In 1997, he proposed the thesis that the impact of non-governmental organization on international policymaking was cyclical rather than upwardly sloping. He was the author of The Path of World Trade Law in the 21st Century (World Scientific, 2014).

He was known for his neologisms on international policy issues. For example, he coined the term "ecolonomy" to signify that Earth's ecology and economy were two sides of the same coin. He also coined the term "SCOO" as an acronym for the trade sanction in the World Trade Organization called "suspension of concessions or other obligations".

Charnovitz wrote on numerous issues in international law and US foreign relations such as climate change, decarbonization, and international migration. He advocated experimentalism in republican government. Beginning in 1983, he advocated that the United States supplement its participation in the United Nations by intensifying US cooperation with other democracies.
