= Conservation Innovation Grants =

Conservation Innovation Grants were provided for in a new component of the Environmental Quality Incentives Program (EQIP) enacted in the 2002 farm bill (P.L. 107-171, Sec. 2301). This component provides an unspecified portion of EQIP funds for competitive matching grants of up to 50% for innovative approaches to conservation.

Examples of such approaches specified in the statute include market systems for pollution reduction, promoting carbon sequestration in soils, and leveraging these funds with money from other sources to promote environmental accomplishments in connection with agricultural production.
