= Marc Edelman =

Marc Edelman (born 1952, New York, New York) is an academic author and professor of anthropology at Hunter College and the Graduate Center of the City University of New York. He was president of the American Ethnological Society from 2017 to 2019.

He has also taught or been a visiting researcher at the University of Costa Rica, Tashkent State University (Uzbekistan), Yale University, Princeton University, the Institute for Advanced Study, and the Instituto de Altos Estudios Nacionales (Ecuador).

Edelman received his B.A. (1975), M.A. (1978) and his Ph.D. (1985) in Anthropology from Columbia University. His research has analyzed agrarian change in Latin America, transnational social movements, rural development problems, historical and contemporary land grabbing, the rise of authoritarian populism, and the human rights of rural populations.

== Books ==
- Edelman, Marc (2024). Peasant Politics of the Twenty-first Century: Transnational Social Movements and Agrarian Change. Ithaca, NY: Cornell University Press. ISBN 978-1-5017-7394-5.
- Scoones, Ian; Borras Jr., Saturnino M.; Baviskar, Amita; Edelman, Marc; Peluso, Nancy Lee; and Wolford, Wendy (2024). Climate Change and Critical Agrarian Studies. London: Routledge. ISBN 978-1-032-74165-9.
- Scoones, Ian; Edelman, Marc; Borras Jr., Saturnino M.; Forero, Lyda Fernanda; Hall, Ruth; and Wolford, Wendy (2021). Authoritarian Populism and the Rural World. London: Routledge. ISBN 978-0-367-75394-8.
- Edelman, Marc; Hall, Ruth; Borras Jr., Saturnino M.; Scoones, Ian; White, Ben; Wolford, Wendy (2018). Global land grabbing and political reactions 'from below'. Abingdon, Oxon New York, NY: Routledge. ISBN 9781138082373.
- Edelman, Marc (2017). Activistas empedernidos e intelecturales comprometidos: ensayos sobre movimientos sociales, derechos humanos y estudios latinoamericanos (1a. ed.). Quito, Ecuador: Instituto de Altos Estudios Nacionales. ISBN 9789942290052.
- Edelman, Marc; Borras, Saturnino M. (2016). Political dynamics of transnational agrarian movements. Black Point, Nova Scotia: Fernwood Publishing. ISBN 9781780449159.
- Edelman, Marc; Borras, Saturnino M. (2016). Political dynamics of transnational agrarian movements. Black Point, Nova Scotia: Fernwood Publishing. ISBN 9781552668177.
- Edelman, Marc (2016). Estudios agrarios críticos: tierras, semillas, soberanía alimentaria y derechos de las y los campesinos. Quito, Ecuador: IAEN, Instituto de Altos Estudios Nacionales. ISBN 9789942950741.
- Edelman, Marc; Scott, James C.; Baviskar, Amita; Borras Jr, Saturnino M.; Kandiyoti, Deniz; Holt-Giménez, Eric; Weis, Tony; Wolford, Wendy (2021). Critical perspectives on food sovereignty (First issued in paperback ed.). London: Routledge. ISBN 9781138122765.
- Edelman, Marc; Oya, Carlos; Borras Jr., Saturnino (2015). Global land grabs. London: Routledge. ISBN 9781138830530.
- Edelman, Marc (2007). Social democracy in the global periphery: origins, challenges, prospects (1. publ ed.). Cambridge: Cambridge University Press. ISBN 978-0521686877.
- Edelman, Marc (2010). The anthropology of development and globalization: from classical political economy to contemporary neoliberalism (Nachdr. ed.). Malden, Massachusetts: Blackwell. ISBN 978-0631228790.
- Edelman, Marc (1999). Peasants against globalization: rural social movements in Costa Rica. Stanford, California: Stanford University Press. ISBN 0804734011.
- Ciencia social en Costa Rica: experiencias de vida e investigación (1. ed.). Heredia, Costa Rica: EUNA Ed. de la Univ. Nacional. 1998. ISBN 9977651256.
- Edelman, Marc (1992). The logic of the latifundio: the large estates of northwestern Costa Rica since the late 19 century. Stanford, Calif: Stanford Univ. Pr. ISBN 0804720444.
- Edelman, Marc; Kenen, Joanne (1989). The Costa Rica reader (1. ed.). New York: Grove Weidenfeld. ISBN 0802131247.
- Edelman, Marc; Fritsche, Klaus (1988). Weder Schaf noch Wolf: Sowjetunion - Lateinamerika 1917 - 1987. Bonn: Ila. ISBN 9783924958169.
