= United States v. Weitzenhoff =

- Court: United States Court of Appeals for the Ninth Circuit
- Full case name: United States of America v. Michael H. Weitzenhoff; Thomas W. Mariani
- Argued: Jan. 11, 1993
- Decided: August 3, 1993
- Citations: 1 F.3d 1523; 38 ERC 1365; 23 Envtl. L. Rep. 21,322

Case history
- Subsequent history: Amended on denial of rehearing and rehearing en banc, 35 F.3d 1275; 24 Envtl. L. Rep. 21,504, August 8, 1994; cert. denied, 513 U.S. 1128, 115 S.Ct. 939 (1995)

Court membership
- Judges sitting: Alfred Goodwin, Betty Binns Fletcher, Marilyn L. Huff (S.D. Cal.)

Case opinions
- Majority: Fletcher, joined by Goodwin, Huff
- Dissent: Kleinfeld (dissenting from denial of rehearing en banc), joined by Reinhardt, Kozinski, Trott, Nelson

Laws applied
- Clean Water Act

United States v. Weitzenhoff, 35 F.3d 1275 (9th Cir. 1993) is a legal opinion from the Ninth Circuit Court of Appeals that addresses the confusing mens rea requirement of a federal environmental law that imposed criminal sanctions on certain polluters. The main significance of the court's opinion was that it interpreted the word "knowingly" in the statute (that is, a requirement that the violator "knowingly" violated another section of the environmental statute) to mean a general awareness of the wrongfulness of one's actions or the likelihood of illegality, rather than an actual knowledge of the statute being violated. Circuit Court Judge Betty Binns Fletcher authored the majority's legal opinion in this case.

The case is illustrative of the modern trend to weaken the mens rea requirement for criminal liability in regulatory offenses or crimes relating to public safety. This case is noteworthy because it has been cited in at least sixteen subsequent legal opinions—not only in the Ninth Circuit Court of Appeals, but also in the Second Circuit Court of Appeals, the Seventh Circuit Court of Appeals, and federal district courts in California, Florida, Indiana, Kansas, and Pennsylvania. This case has been cited or discussed in nearly twenty legal academic journal articles. The Court of Appeals' detailed explanation of how it interprets what appears to be a specific-intent statute as something akin to a strict liability statute has merited its inclusion in a widely used Criminal Law casebook for 1L law courses.

== Factual background ==
The defendants, Michael H. Weitzenhoff and Thomas W. Mariani, were managers at East Honolulu Community Services sewage treatment plant in Hawaii. Weitzenhoff and Mariani were indicted for 31 counts of conspiracy and violating the Clean Water Act. Evidence showed that non-biodegradable waste from the treatment plant was dumped into the ocean 40 times from April 1988 to June 1989, grossly exceeding the permit that limited the amount of waste allowed to be dumped into the ocean. Employees testified that they dumped the waste into the ocean during the middle of the night on orders from Weitzenhoff and Mariani. The waste was removed at a point that bypassed the system that kept track of the amount of dumped waste, causing a misrepresentation of waste that was actually being dumped by the treatment plant. The waste that bypassed a part of the system was not being calculated in the total amount of waste being dumped, and was not reported to the U.S. Environmental Protection Agency or the United States Department of Health. Also, the treatment plant repeatedly denied the floating debris in the nearby ocean came from them as more and more surfers complained. The two managers admitted to ordering the dumping of the waste, but claimed they thought they had a permit allowing them to dump waste into the ocean.

The District Court, Judge David Alan Ezra, instructed the jury that "knowingly" meant that Weitzenhoff and Mariani knew they were dumping waste into the ocean. If the jury believed that, then they would be found guilty. The jury found Weitzenhoff and Mariani guilty of six of the thirty one charges. Weitzenhoff was sentenced to 21 months in prison, and Mariani was to serve 33 months.

== Ninth Circuit's opinion: the issue of intent ==
On appeal, the defendants argued that the judged erred in his/her interpretation of the statute and in the instruction of the jury. They argued that the judge was wrong to instruct the jury that no proof was needed to show they knew their act was unlawful, and that the judge failed to instruct the jury that the Defendants mistakenly thought they were authorized to dump the waste under a permit.

The defendants relied on Liparota v. United States in their defense, case involving the fraudulent use of food stamps. There the U.S. Supreme Court had interpreted the word "knowingly" in the statute as implying actual knowledge of the legal violation. The Ninth Circuit distinguished Liparota on the grounds that it did not pertain to acts that cause public endangerment, and therefore criminal liability needed to be used more sparingly. The Ninth Circuit found more applicable the case United States v. International Minerals & Chem. Corp., in which the Supreme Court had held that when one handles wastes and dangerous materials, knowledge of the regulations is assumed.

The Ninth Circuit affirmed the judgment of the district Court.

== Ninth Circuit's opinion: other issues ==
The Ninth Circuit also addressed a few other legal issued raised by Weitzenhoff and Mariani.

=== Expert testimony ===
The trial court had allowed government expert witnesses to testify at the trial about the technical terms of the treatment plant's permit, including the limitations on waste discharge into the ocean. Weitzenhoff and Mariani argued that such testimony defining key terms of the permit, and explaining its prohibitions, amounted to an impermissible delegation of the trial judge's duties—it amounted to having these witnesses instruct the jury on the law rather than the judge. The Ninth Circuit agreed with this argument, but held that this was harmless error on the part of the trial judge, "because, under a proper interpretation of the permit, the discharges admitted to by Weitzenhoff and Mariani necessarily violated the permit."

=== Statutory vagueness ===
The defendants also argued that the statute must be unconstitutionally vague, because of the absence of a requirement that they knew they were violating the law, and the fact that key provisions of the permit, in particular those that were debated at trial, have no established meaning. The Ninth Circuit considered this issue but concluded that the defendants had adequate knowledge of the illegality of their dumping, and this made the vagueness issue irrelevant as the defendants had adequate notice.

=== Other claims ===
In the appeal, Weitzenhoff and Mariani also challenged the exclusion of certain evidence at trial, entrapment by estoppel, prosecutorial misconduct, and a prolonged sentence imposed on Mariani for perjuring himself when he testified at trial.

== Request for rehearing (denied) and dissenting opinion ==
Weitzenhoff and Mariani requested a rehearing before the Ninth Circuit en banc, which the Court of Appeals denied, affirming its previous decision by a three-judge panel and making minor revisions in its legal opinion.

Several judges on the Ninth Circuit Court of Appeals took this opportunity to collaborate on a dissenting opinion against the decisions to deny a rehearing en banc. Circuit Judge Andrew Kleinfeld authored the legal opinion for this dissent, arguing that imposing criminal liability in this case would deter others from useful careers in the public utilities. Joining in this dissenting opinion were Circuit Judges Alex Kozinski, Stephen S. Trott, and T.G. Nelson.

== Rejected appeal to the supreme court ==
Mariani and Weitzenhoof appealed their case to the United States Supreme Court, but the Court denied certiorari, refusing to hear the appeal. This allowed the convictions to stand.
