= Global Environment and Trade Study =

US-based research institute

The Global Environment & Trade Study (GETS) was a non-profit research institute established in 1994 to study the complex linkages between international trade and environmental sustainability. GETS supported numerous research projects on the legal, economic, and ecological aspects of trade and environment.

GETS was centered at Yale University.

GETS also studied the expanding role of civil society in global governance.

In 2004, the GETS Board decided that a sufficient amount had been accomplished over the decade, and that it was time to terminate the project.

== Accomplishments ==
GETS had four major accomplishments:

- First, GETS helped to raise the consciousness of international institutions and governments about the importance of the trade-environment linkage and about the need for better analytical underpinnings of intergovernmental decisionmaking. GETS was pleased in 2001 when environment was incorporated as a specific goal of the World Trade Organization Doha negotiating round.
- Second, GETS advocated greater transparency at the WTO in documentation and called for opportunities for non-governmental organizations (NGOs) to submit amicus curiae briefs. GETS was happy to see the WTO agree to release more documentation and to see the Appellate Body permit amicus briefs in the United States – Shrimp case.
- Third, GETS called for a more environment-friendly interpretation of trade rules, particularly regarding environmental measures being reviewed under Article XX of the General Agreement on Tariffs and Trade (GATT). The Appellate Body did so in several landmark WTO cases.
- Fourth, GETS called for the inclusion of an environmental dimension in emerging bilateral and regional free trade agreements, especially in Latin America. Progress continues to be made in doing so.

== Board members and staff ==
The founders of GETS were James Cameron, Steve Charnovitz, Daniel Esty, and Mark Ritchie.

- James Cameron brought his years of experience at building environmental law institutions and led the GETS work on climate change, the interplay of international tribunals, and the precautionary principle.
- Steve Charnovitz brought his years of experience in the international trade policy arena and was the overall project director.
- Daniel Esty brought his years of experience as a U.S. environmental regulator and led the GETS work on data-generated policymaking, optimal environmental governance, and environmental policy in China.
- Mark Ritchie brought his years of experience in NGO networking and agricultural policy, and led the GETS work on agriculture, social development, and public communications.

In 2000, Monica Araya joined the GETS Board and focused on environment, trade and investment issues in developing countries.

Some staff associated with GETS included Orin Kirshner, who served as Executive Director from 2001–2003, Beatrice Chaytor, Hari Osofsky, and John Wickham.

== Institutional participation and collaboration ==
GETS had three major participating institutions—the Foundation for International Environmental Law and Development (located in London), the Institute for Agriculture and Trade Policy (located in Minneapolis), and the Yale Center for Environmental Law & Policy (located in New Haven) .

In addition, GETS collaborated with numerous research institutes in developed and developing countries.

== Conferences ==
GETS held policy conferences or workshops in Cancun, Geneva, London, Miami, New York, Seattle, Tokyo, and Washington.

GETS also held a major Conference in Singapore in June 1996 co-sponsored with the National University of Singapore. At the end of that Conference, the co-chairs (Tommy Koh, Dan Esty, and James Cameron) issued a statement with several recommendations, many of which were adopted by the WTO, other international organizations, and governments in subsequent years.

== Funding ==
The major funders of GETS included: the Ford Foundation, the U.S. Environmental Protection Agency, the Netherlands Ministry of Housing, Spatial Planning and the Environment, the German-Marshall Fund, the John D. & Catherine T. MacArthur Foundation, the Center for Global Partnership/Japan Foundation, the Pew Charitable Trusts, and the Rockefeller Brothers Fund.

== Commentary ==
A retrospective on competitiveness and the Council's work was written by Martin Neil Baily and Robert Z. Lawrence.

== Publications ==
Principals and researchers supported by GETS produced dozens of books and articles on trade and the environment, and related topics during its ten years of operation. Among them were:

"Achieving Harmony in Trade and Environment", http://www.gets.org/pages/harmony/.

- Monica Araya, "Mexico's NAFTA Trauma: Myth and Reality", in Carolyn L. Deere & Daniel C. Esty, Greening the America's, MIT Press, 2002.
- Scott Barrett ed., Special Issue on Trade and the Environment, Environment and Development Economics, October 2000.
- James Cameron, "The Precautionary Principle", in Gary P. Sampson & W. Bradnee Chambers, ed., Trade, Environment, and the Millennium, 2d. ed., U.N. University Press, 2002.
- Steve Charnovitz, "Two Centuries of Participation: NGOs and International Law", Michigan Journal of International Law, Vol 18, 1997.
- Steve Charnovitz, "Reflections on North American Environmental Cooperation", Canada–United States Law Journal, Vol. 28, 2002.
- Steve Charnovitz, "A World Environment Organization", Columbia Journal of Environmental Law, Vol. 27, 2002.
- Daniel Esty, "Non--governmental Organizations at the World Trade Organization: Cooperation, Competition, or Exclusion", Journal of International Environmental Law, March 1998.
- Daniel Esty and Damien Geradin, "Environmental Protection and International Competitiveness", A Conceptual Framework", Journal of World Trade Vol. 32(3), 1998.
- Daniel Esty, "We the People: Civil Society and the World Trade Organization", in Marco Bronckers & Reinhard Quick eds., New Directions in International Economic Law: Essays in Honour of John H. Jackson, Kluwer Law, 2000.
- Agata Fijalkowski & James Cameron, Trade and the Environment: Bridging the Gap, T.M.C. Asser Instituut, 1998.
- Lakshman D. Guruswamy, "Book Review: Asian Dragons and Green Trade", Colorado Journal of International Environmental Law and Policy, Summer 1998.
- David E. Kaczka, "A Primer on the Shrimp-Turtle Controversy", Review of European & Community International Environmental Law, Vol. 6, 1997.
- Sophia Murphy, "Structural Distortions in World Agricultural Markets: Do WTO Rules Support Sustainable Agriculture?", Columbia Journal of Environmental Laws, Vol. 27, 2002.
- Mark Ritchie, Kristin Dawkins, and Mark Vallianatos, "Intellectual Property Rights and Biodiversity: The Industrialization of Natural Resources and Traditional Knowledge", St. John's Journal of Legal Commentary, Spring 1996.
- Mark Ritchie & Kristen Dawkins, "WTO Food and Agricultural Rules: Sustainable Agriculture and the Human Right to Food", Minnesota Journal of Global Trade , Winter 2000.
- Kal Raustiala, "Law, Liberalization & International Narcotics Trafficking", New York University Journal of International Law and Politics, Fall 1999.
- Christopher D. Stone, "Too Many Fishing Boats, Too Few Fish: Can Trade Laws Trim Subsidies and Restore the Balance in Global Fisheries", Ecology Law Quarterly, Vol. 24, 1997.
- Simon S.C. Tay & Daniel C. Esty, Asian Dragons and Green Trade, Times Academic Press, 1996.
- John Wickham, "Toward a Green Multilateral Investment Framework: NAFTA and the Search for Models", Georgetown International Environmental Law Review Vol. 12, 2000.
