= Global Climate Action Summit =

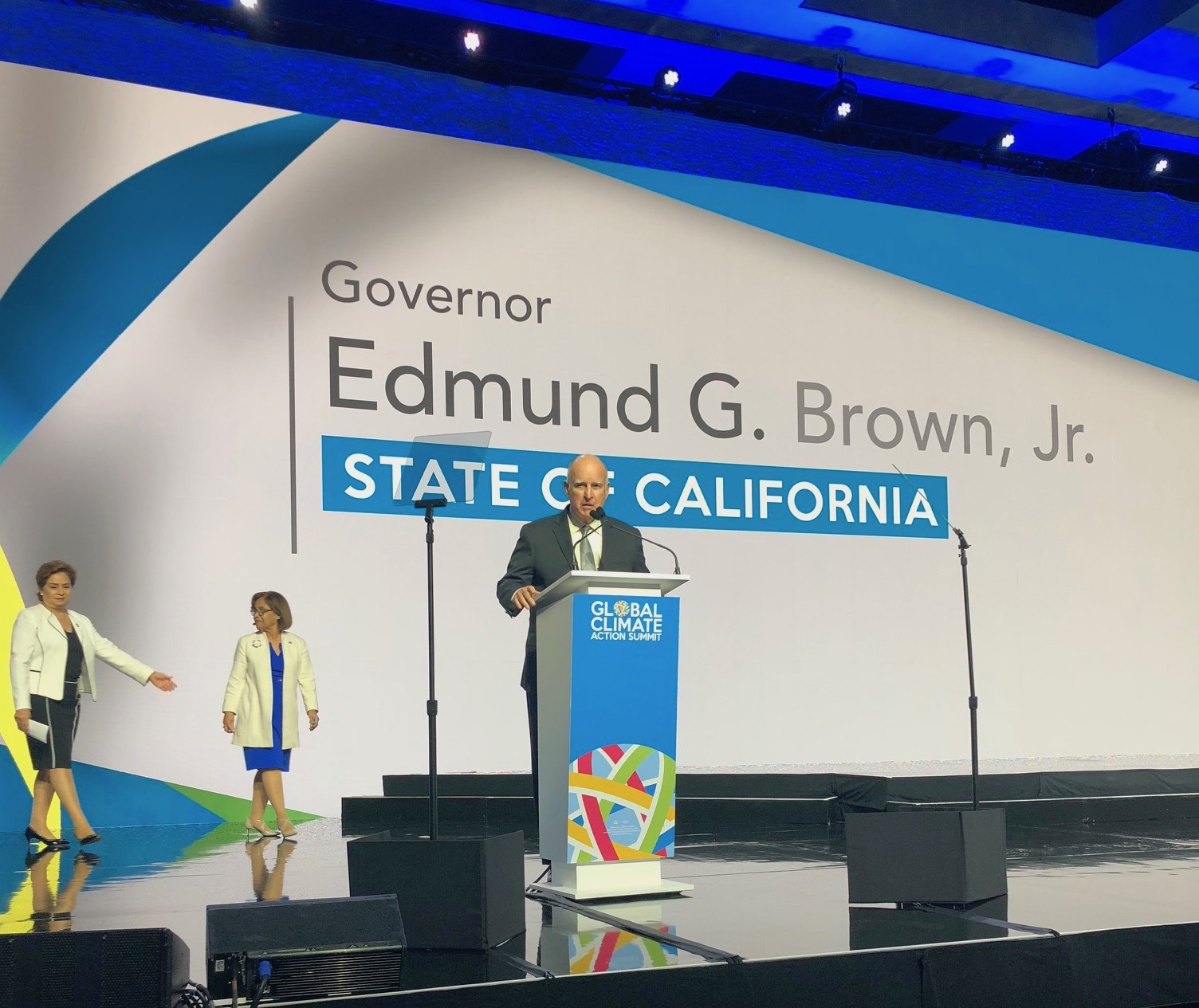
- Governor Edmund G. Brown at the summit.
- Date: 14–12 September 2018
- Location: San Francisco, California, United States
- Organized by: UN
- Participants: UN member countries

The Global Climate Action Summit was held September 12–14, 2018 at the Moscone Convention Center in San Francisco, California. Hosted by California Governor and co-founder of the Under2 Coalition and America's Pledge, Jerry Brown, the summit aimed to address climate change by bringing together non-state actors and elected leaders at the state and local level. The summit was also co-chaired by the UN Secretary General’s Special Envoy for Climate Action, Michael Bloomberg; the Chairman of the Mahindra Group, Anand Mahindra; and the Executive Secretary of UN Climate Change, Patricia Espinosa.

The summit's programming fell into five main areas: healthy energy systems, inclusive economic growth, sustainable communities, land and ocean stewardship, and climate investment. Affiliate events also showcased climate initiatives and sustainable development in the Bay Area.

Many climate leaders attended, including UN Secretary General António Guterres, former US Vice President Al Gore, Jane Goodall, and prominent scientists and researchers. Speaking at the summit, Guterres said, "the Global Climate Action Summit has brought together actors demonstrating the vast opportunity afforded by climate action. They are betting on green because they understand this is the path to prosperity and peace on a healthy planet.” Also present were celebrities such as Alec Baldwin, Harrison Ford, and Dave Matthews.

The summit had over 4,000 attendees, as well as tens of thousands more who attended the 300 side events held around San Francisco.

At the summit, a group of twenty-nine organizations announced a commitment of $4 billion to combat climate change over the next five years. The commitment was the largest philanthropic investment made addressing climate change to date. The summit encouraged governments to finalize the implementation guidelines of the Paris Agreement in Poland in December 2018 and guide them in preparing their national climate action plans in 2020 with short and long-term climate strategies.

The summit also brought protests, with thousands blocking the entrance to the convention center to raise awareness about continued oil and gas drilling in California despite Gov. Brown's progressive climate stance.
