= Bloomberg Philanthropies =

Charitable organization

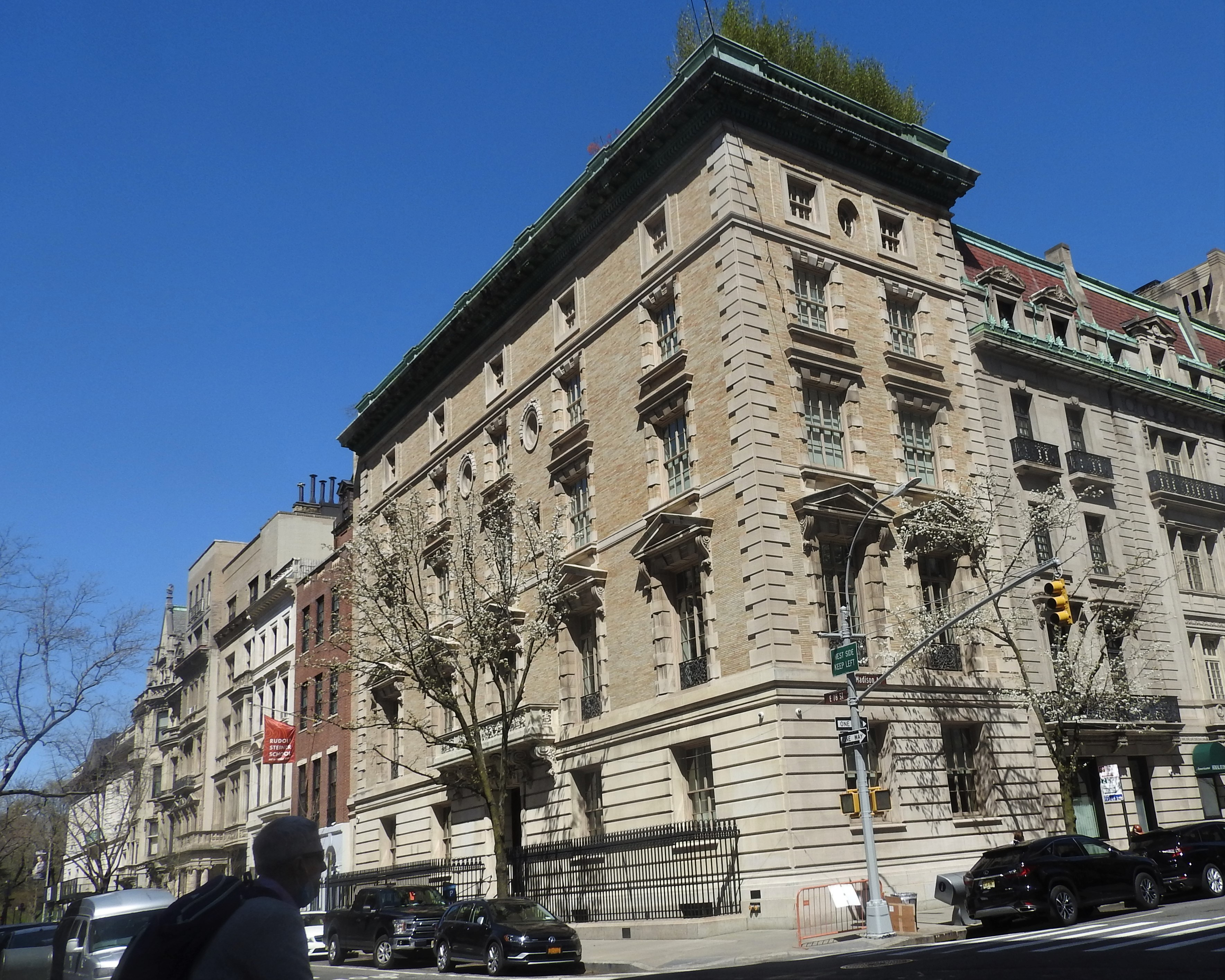
- Headquarters at Stuyvesant Fish House
- Founder: Michael R. Bloomberg
- Purpose: Environment, Public Health, the Arts, Government Innovation, Education, Women's Economic Development in Africa
- Headquarters: 25 East 78th Street
- Location: New York City, United States of America
- Region served: Global
- Method: Funding, Grants, Program Support, Advocacy
- Key people: Michael R. Bloomberg, founder Patti Harris, CEO
- Website: www.bloomberg.org

Bloomberg Philanthropies is a philanthropic organization that encompasses all of the charitable giving of founder Michael R. Bloomberg. Headquartered in New York City, Bloomberg Philanthropies focuses its resources on five areas: the environment, public health, the arts, government innovation and education. According to the Foundation Center, Bloomberg Philanthropies was the 10th largest foundation in the United States in 2015, the last year for which data was available. Bloomberg has pledged to donate the majority of his wealth, currently estimated at more than $54 billion. Patti Harris is the CEO of Bloomberg Philanthropies.

== History ==
While working at Bloomberg L.P., Bloomberg donated much of his wealth to medical research, education and the arts. He also sat on the boards of numerous charitable organizations. Beginning in 2004, Bloomberg appeared on Chronicle of Philanthropy’s list of top 50 Americans who had donated the most money that year. Between 2004 and 2011, Bloomberg was listed as a top 10 American philanthropist each year.

For two consecutive years, in 2023 and 2024, Bloomberg was listed as having given to the most charitable causes; in 2024, he distributed $3.7 billion through the Bloomberg Philanthropies to various organizations, schools, and initiatives.

Since 2006, the headquarters has been located at Stuyvesant Fish House on East 78th Street in Manhattan.

== Initiatives ==
Bloomberg Philanthropies directs its resources to five issue areas: the environment, public health, the arts, government innovation and education.

=== Environment ===
Bloomberg Philanthropies has focused on combating climate change and moving toward clean energy sources. In 2011, the foundation partnered with the Sierra Club’s Beyond Coal campaign by donating $50 million toward shutting down coal-fired power plants. On April 8, 2015, Bloomberg Philanthropies increased its support of the Beyond Coal campaign with a $30 million pledge, in order to accelerate the goal of closing and replacing half of all U.S. coal power plants with clean energy by 2017. Beyond Coal expanded into Europe in summer 2017 with a goal of phasing out the use of coal on the continent by 2030. The campaign marked the closure of the last coal-burning power plant in Austria in 2020. 2020 also saw the expansion of Beyond Coal into Asia including the launch in of Korea Beyond Coal in September of that year. In September 2023, Michael Bloomberg announced that Bloomberg Philanthropies would commit an additional $500 million to Beyond Carbon to 'finish the job on coal."

Building on the momentum of the Beyond Coal work, Bloomberg Philanthropies launched Beyond Carbon, taking aim at natural gas and combustion-driven cars. In September 2022, launched Beyond Petrochemicals, a campaign to halt permits for and construction of plastics and petrochemical plants. The campaign supports efforts already underway by local communities in Louisiana, Texas and Appalachia. Bloomberg Philanthropies pledged $85 million to the efforts and is focused on blocking construction of more than 120 planned petrochemical plants.

Bloomberg Philanthropies partnered with RadicalMedia to produce the 2017 documentary "From the Ashes." the film was distributed by National Geographic and debuted at the 2017 Tribeca Film Festival. The film appeared in theaters and aired on National Geographic in summer 2017. In conjunction with the film, Bloomberg Philanthropies announced a new commitment and crowdfunding campaign to support "entities backing economic development in communities that are historically dependent on the coal industry, and have suffered as plants have closed." In 2018, Bloomberg Philanthropies again partnered with National Geographic and Radical Media for a follow-up documentary, “From Paris to Pittsburgh.” The film examined the social and economic impacts of climate change-fueled natural disasters, from the heartland to the nation's coastlines.

Bloomberg Philanthropies also partners with the C40 Cities Climate Leadership Group, where Bloomberg is the former chairman, to curb carbon emissions in major cities around the world. In 2012, Bloomberg Philanthropies made a $6 million donation to the Environmental Defense Fund to help secure strong state-level regulations for hydraulic fracturing. Bloomberg has stated his support for "responsible" fracking as an alternative to coal power. In January 2014, Bloomberg Philanthropies committed $53 million to Vibrant Oceans Initiative over the course of five years to help reform fisheries and increase sustainable populations. In April 2014, Bloomberg Philanthropies invested $5 million in Little Sun, a solar-powered lamp company founded by artist Olafur Eliasson and entrepreneur Frederik Ottesen.

In June 2017, after President Donald Trump announced plans to pull the United States out of the Paris climate agreement, Bloomberg Philanthropies Founder Mike Bloomberg unveiled plans to honor the nation's commitment through a network of governors, mayors and businesses. The alliance, known as America's Pledge was coordinated by Bloomberg Philanthropies. In cooperation with the Rocky Mountain Institute and the World Resources Institute, America's Pledge monitored climate activity and issued a series of reports in keeping with the climate accord's data requirements. When President Joe Biden took office in 2021 and announced plans to rejoin the climate agreement, America's Pledge and another Bloomberg Philanthropies led climate initiative called We Are Still In joined forces to become America is All In.

In October 2020, Bloomberg Philanthropies was announced as one of the alliance partners of Prince William's Earthshot Prize, to find solutions to environmental issues. Since then, the organization has co-hosted an innovation summit to announce the finalists for the annual prize. The Prize awards one million pounds to five winners each year making major progress in five areas focused on climate solutions.

In May 2022, Bloomberg Philanthropies announced a $242 million expansion into its efforts to help the world transition to clean energy. The announcement, made during the Sustainable Energy for All forum in Kigali, Rwanda, announced the investment will expand current energy transition efforts to 10 countries. These include Bangladesh, Brazil, Colombia, Kenya, Mozambique, Nigeria, Pakistan, South Africa, Turkey, and Vietnam. The initiative will focus on delivering data and research to governments and decision makers to aid and accelerate renewable investments; developing public awareness; working with countries to implement transition policies through international collaboration; launching clean energy pilot projects; and exploring strategies to phase out coal use. Key partners include Sustainable Energy for All and ClimateWorks Foundation.

Bloomberg Philanthropies and eight other foundations announced in June 2022 they would partner on a $1 billion commitment to support ocean conservation and marine protection. The Washington Post reported the commitment was “roughly equal to all philanthropic giving for marine protected areas and habitat protection over the past decade.”

In April 2023, Bloomberg Philanthropies pledged $50 million to support “The New York Climate Exchange” (“The Exchange”) on Governors Island in New York City. The Exchange — a $700 million, 172-acre international center for developing and deploying dynamic solutions to the global climate crisis — is set to open in 2028.

=== Public health ===
Led by epidemiologist Kelly J. Henning, the Bloomberg Philanthropies public health program has focused on reducing tobacco use through the MPOWER tobacco control strategy, making roads safer and eradicating polio, among other public health initiatives. In March 2012, the foundation donated $220 million to fight tobacco use over a four-year period. Following new commitments in December 2016, Bloomberg Philanthropies reached a total of $1 billion in its campaign to reduce tobacco use, especially in low- and middle-income countries. In March 2013, Bloomberg Philanthropies donated $100 million to help the Bill and Melinda Gates Foundation eradicate polio worldwide. An additional $100 million was later pledged to the Global Polio Eradication Initiative at a December 2025 event in Abu Dhabi.

In 2009, Bloomberg Philanthropies partnered with the World Health Organization to donate $125 million to reduce traffic-related fatalities. Further commitments were made in 2014, 2020, and 2026, bringing its total investment in the initiative to $865 million. The new funding is intended to expand road-safety and cycling interventions to 13 countries and more than 30 cities.

Bloomberg Philanthropies has also supported initiatives to improve women's health. In July 2012, the foundation committed $50 million to the Global Family Planning Initiative, a Bill and Melinda Gates Foundation program focused on providing obstetric care and contraceptives to women in developing countries. This contribution came after Bloomberg pledged $250,000 to support Planned Parenthood in February 2012. In October 2012, the foundation also donated $8 million to the Bloomberg Philanthropies Maternal Health Program, which focuses on reducing maternal deaths in Tanzania. In March 2014, Bloomberg Philanthropies expanded its work in Tanzania and to provide reproductive health services in Africa and Latin America.

Beginning in 2012, Bloomberg Philanthropies pledged $16.5 million toward the Obesity Prevention Program, a three-year effort to support public health policies aimed at reducing obesity in Mexico, which has one of the highest rates of obesity in the world. With support from Bloomberg Philanthropies, Mexican health leaders and activists mounted a national health campaign against soda consumption and successfully lobbied for the passage of a national sugar-sweetened beverage tax. In 2014 - the first year of the tax - purchases of sugary drinks in Mexico dropped by up to 12%.

In January 2014, the Obesity Prevention Program and other health advocates in Mexico successfully lobbied for the passage of an 8% tax on high calorie snacks, which was intended to work in tandem with the 2014 soda tax to reduce unhealthy food purchases nationwide. In June 2015, a study by researchers at Mexico's National Institute of Public Health and the University of North Carolina, Chapel Hill showed a corresponding average reduction of 5.1% in purchases of all food items subject to the junk food tax. Following the tax's implementation, lower-income households in Mexico purchased 10.2% less junk food, while medium-income households bought 5.8% less overall.

On March 23, 2015, Bloomberg Philanthropies launched the four-year, $100 million Data for Health initiative in partnership with the Australian government. The initiative's stated goal is to help 20 low and middle-income countries improve public health data collection and more effectively address public health problems. On June 21, 2016, Bloomberg Philanthropies announced the official launch of health partnerships with the first 18 participant countries, which include China, India, Sri Lanka, Myanmar, Bangladesh, Indonesia, the Philippines, Brazil, Ecuador, Malawi, Morocco, Papua New Guinea, Peru, Rwanda, Solomon Islands, Tanzania, and Zambia.

In 2012, Bloomberg Philanthropies began drowning prevention efforts in Bangladesh, the leading cause of death for children there. A partnership was later set up with the Centre of Injury Prevention and Research. The project focuses on providing childcare and swimming lessons to children. According to The Daily Telegraph, child drowning deaths have been reduced by 80% as a result. Drowning prevention efforts in Bangladesh, Ghana, India, Uganda, Vietnam and the US received an additional $60 million in funding in 2024.

In 2025, during the World Health Organization's Lead Poisoning Prevention Week, Bloomberg Philanthropies launched a Lead Poisoning Prevention Initiative to help address global lead exposure. Through the initiative, the World Health Organization has worked with high-risk countries, including Ghana, to adopt clinical guidelines for managing lead exposure and strengthen early-detection systems.

=== Arts ===
Bloomberg Philanthropies’ focus on the arts includes a $32 million commitment in 2011 to funding arts organizations and initiatives throughout New York City as well as provide business management training. Bloomberg Philanthropies invited 250 small and midsize arts organizations to apply for the $32 million disbursal. In September 2011, Bloomberg Philanthropies joined several foundations to contribute a total of $11.5 million to ArtPlace, a nationwide art funding initiative led by the National Endowment for the Arts that aims to use the arts as a strategy for economic development.

In June 2013, Bloomberg Philanthropies announced a $15 million grant to five institutions — Art Institute of Chicago, the Metropolitan Museum of Art, the Museum of Modern Art, the New York Botanical Garden, and Guggenheim Museum — as part of the Bloomberg Arts Engagement Initiative to develop mobile applications for visitors. In September 2014, Bloomberg Philanthropies committed $17 million to increase the use of digital technology at six cultural institutions – The Brooklyn Museum, American Museum of Natural History, Cooper Hewitt, Smithsonian Design Museum, San Francisco Museum of Modern Art, the Science Museum in London, and Gardens by the Bay in Singapore – and rebranded the program as Bloomberg Connects. The foundation has committed a total of $83 million to cultural institutions around the world.

In October 2014, Bloomberg Philanthropies launched the Public Art Challenge, a competition that invited local leaders and arts organizations to collaborate on temporary public art projects that would celebrate creativity and drive economic development. On June 23, 2015, Bloomberg Philanthropies announced four winning projects, selected from 237 nationwide submissions. The winning proposals came from Gary, Indiana; Los Angeles, CA; Spartanburg, SC; and a joint effort between Albany, Schenectady, and Troy, NY. Each winning proposal received $1 million to support the proposed public art installation over the following two years. In 2018, Bloomberg Philanthropies unveiled a new round of the Public Art Challenge and in January 2019 announced five winners: Anchorage, AK, Camden, NJ, Coral Springs, FL, Jackson, MS, and Tulsa, OK.

From July 16 to August 14, 2016, the Los Angeles Department of Cultural Affairs hosted Current: LA Water, a citywide public art biennial supported by a $1 million grant from Bloomberg Philanthropies’ Public Art Challenge initiative. Local artists created public art pieces across 16 different locations to remind LA residents of the city's important relationship with water, in the face of record-setting drought and the ongoing work to revitalize the Los Angeles River.

Speaking to the United States Conference of Mayors in May 2017, Bloomberg Philanthropies founder Michael Bloomberg announced the creation of the Partnership for Health Cities initiative which offers cities technical support to improve the health of residents. By July, fifty cities were participating in the program.

Through Bloomberg Philanthropies, Michael Bloomberg became the largest supporter of the Perelman Performing Arts Center, the final major piece of redevelopment of the World Trade Center site in Lower Manhattan.

In 2025, Bloomberg Philanthropies supported the 20th anniversary of The Gates, including the retrospective exhibit at The Shed and an augmented reality experience in Central Park.

=== Government innovation ===
Bloomberg Philanthropies' government innovation program funds efforts to make city government more effective. Early grants established Financial Empowerment Centers ($16.2 million, 2013), which provide free financial counseling to low-income residents, and "Innovation Delivery Teams" ($24 million in 2012 and $45 million in 2014), which work to streamline municipal operations. The $42 million What Works Cities initiative, announced in 2015, set a goal of helping at least 100 American cities of between 100,000 and one million residents manage and apply municipal data; from 2017 it also certified participating cities against defined data-management standards. The Local Infrastructure Hub, launched in 2022 with the National League of Cities, the United States Conference of Mayors and Results for America, helps smaller cities and towns identify and apply for federal infrastructure grants, of which roughly 400 programs were available under the 2021 infrastructure law.

Through the Mayors Challenge, a recurring competition rewarding municipal innovation proposals, the foundation has awarded prizes to cities in the United States, Europe, and Latin America and the Caribbean. Grand-prize winners have received $5 million or €5 million each and runners-up $1 million or €1 million each: Providence, Rhode Island, for a plan to address a language-skills deficit among low-income children; Barcelona, for improving quality of life for elderly residents; and São Paulo, for a project connecting farmers to urban markets. Nine American cities each received $1 million in the 2018 round, for projects addressing homelessness, climate change and the opioid crisis. The 2025–2026 round, the largest to date, awarded $1 million each to 24 cities in 20 countries for proposals that used artificial intelligence, data and resident input to redesign frontline city services.

Bloomberg Philanthropies also funds executive education for mayors and senior municipal staff. A $32 million gift in 2016 established the Bloomberg Harvard City Leadership Initiative, a partnership with Harvard University housed at the Harvard Kennedy School's Ash Center for Democratic Governance and Innovation, through which Harvard faculty teach mayors and their senior aides. During the first year of the COVID-19 pandemic the program convened weekly calls among mayors, public health officials and other local leaders. Its tenth class of mayors convened in July 2026, by which point nearly 450 mayors had taken part.

A separate $150 million gift in 2021 created the Bloomberg Center for Cities, which supports research, teaching and programming on city government and leadership.

=== Education ===
Bloomberg Philanthropies focuses on driving public policy initiatives and education leadership at a local level as a means to improving America's school system. To date, the organization's education giving has been split between charitable, legislative and political initiatives. In October 2014, Bloomberg Philanthropies launched a $10 million program to help top-performing students from low- and middle-income families apply to and graduate from the nation's top colleges. By December 2016, it pledged to give $1.7 million to the American Talent Initiative, a program run by the College Excellence Program at the Aspen Institute and Ithaka S+R, a consulting subsidiary of Ithaka Harbors.

== Other philanthropic ventures ==
Bloomberg has been a longtime donor to his alma mater, Johns Hopkins University. In January 2013, he made what was then the largest single gift in the school's history, $350 million. Since then, he has given multiple larger donations through Bloomberg Philanthropies. In total, Bloomberg has donated $4.55 billion to Johns Hopkins, making him the most generous living donor to any education institution in the country.

In April 2001, the School of Hygiene and Public Health was renamed as the Johns Hopkins Bloomberg School of Public Health. In May 2012, the Charlotte R. Bloomberg Children's Center opened inside the new Johns Hopkins Hospital, with a focus on pediatric care.

In 2018, Bloomberg announced a $1.8 billion donation to JHU — the largest private donation in modern times to higher education — to make admissions need-blind for perpetuity. And in 2024, Bloomberg Philanthropies donated $1 billion to make medical school free for most students and increase financial aid for nursing, public health and other graduate programs. In August 2024, Bloomberg Philanthropies also committed $600 million to the endowments of four historically Black medical schools: Howard University College of Medicine, Meharry Medical College, and Morehouse School of Medicine (each receiving $175 million), and Charles R. Drew University of Medicine and Science ($75 million).

Bloomberg Family Foundation, that is part of the Bloomberg Philanthropies, provided $387.9 million of development finance in 2022, mainly through NGOs and civil society ($262.6 million), multilateral organizations ($57.3 million), as well as universities, research institutes, and think tanks ($37 million).

Following the start of Russian invasion of Ukraine, Bloomberg Family Foundation contributed $12.1 million in gross development finance to Ukraine. In February 2024, Bloomberg Philanthropies announced plans to invest in Kyiv's digital services, with a particular focus on addressing the urgent mental health needs of its residents.

=== Women's economic development ===
Since 2008 Bloomberg Philanthropies has worked with nonprofit advocacy organizations including Women for Women International and Sustainable Harvest to create economic opportunities for women in Sub-Saharan Africa. Supported initiatives include job training, civic and life skills education, entrepreneurship programs, and a philanthropic data-sharing portal created with the Foundation Center and the King Baudouin Center to help women in Rwanda, Democratic Republic of the Congo, Burundi, Sudan, and Nigeria.

While hosting the U.S.-Africa Business Forum on September 23, 2016, Bloomberg Philanthropies announced a $10 million grant to the Relationship Coffee Institute to support the expansion of its ongoing women's economic development initiatives in Rwanda and Democratic Republic of Congo. The renewed financial commitment will enable the institute to provide an additional 20,000 women in both countries with business training and connections to international coffee markets.

On October 4, 2016, Marriott International opened its first hotel in Rwanda with a pledge to support women trained by the Relationship Coffee Institute and Women for Women International - both local partners of Bloomberg Philanthropies. The new hotel has employed 27 such trainees in hospitality positions and procured their artisanal baskets, coffee, cheese, and honey to provide to hotel guests.

=== Sciences ===
On October 18, 2016, Bloomberg revealed it is donating $50 million to the Museum of Science in Boston, the largest gift in the institution's 186-year history.

== Board of directors ==
As of March 2025:

- Tenley Albright, former Olympic figure skating champion, Director of MIT Collaborative Initiatives, Massachusetts Institute of Technology
- Emma Bloomberg, daughter of Michael Bloomberg
- Georgina Bloomberg, daughter of Michael Bloomberg
- Jeb Bush, Former Governor, Florida
- Geoffrey Canada, President and founder, Harlem Children's Zone
- Kenneth Chenault, Managing Director and Chairman of General Catalyst
- Es Devlin, Artist and stage designer
- Manny Diaz, former Mayor of Miami
- Daniel L. Doctoroff, founder and chairman of Target ALS, former CEO and President of Bloomberg L.P.
- Patti Harris, CEO of Bloomberg Philanthropies
- Mellody Hobson, Co-CEO and president of Ariel Investments
- Robert A. Iger, Senior Advisor, The Walt Disney Company
- Walter Isaacson, author and professor at Tulane University
- Maya Lin, artist
- John J. Mack, Chairman emeritus of Morgan Stanley
- Reverend Joseph M. McShane, President emeritus of Fordham University
- Mike Mullen, former Chairman of the Joint Chiefs of Staff
- Jamie Niven, Retired Chairman, Sotheby's The Americas
- Sam Nunn, Co-chair of the Nuclear Threat Initiative and former U.S. Senator
- Samuel J. Palmisano, Chairman, the Center for Global Enterprise, former president, CEO and chairman of IBM
- Henry Paulson, former U.S. Secretary of the Treasury
- Ruth Porat, President and Chief Investment Officer, Alphabet and Google
- Alfred Sommer, Professor and Dean emeritus at the Johns Hopkins Bloomberg School of Public Health
- Sir Martin Sorrell, Chief Executive of S4 Capital
- Anne Tatlock, former chairman and CEO of Fiduciary Trust International
- Dennis Walcott, President and CEO of Queens Library, former New York City Schools Chancellor
