= America's Pledge =

America's Pledge is a coalition of cities, states, universities, businesses, public sector leaders and citizens that want to ensure that United States fulfill its commitments in Paris Agreement and remains a global leader in the fight against climate change. The organization was created and is led by Michael Bloomberg and Jerry Brown. It was created in 2017 when Donald Trump decided to pull out from the Paris Agreement. The coalition is collecting and spreading information about climate action in the United States and create further action by providing to cities, businesses, states, in USA and possibly abroad, the necessary information for organizing it.

According to the coalition's 2019 report, the number of Americans who support the aim of the initiative is growing. The report states that multiple coalitions committed to support of the Paris Agreement represent 65% of the U.S. population, 51% of U.S. greenhouse gas emissions, and 68% of the U.S. GDP. Already existing policy by these coalitions could reduce emissions by 19% by 2025 and by 25% by 2030, from the level in the year 2005, according to the report which also claims that additional local action without governmental support could reduce greenhouse gas emission of USA by 37% by 2030 from the level in 2005. With federal support, the report claims, the emissions could be reduced by 49% by 2030 and achieve a decline consistent with the 1.5 degree target of the UN. The coalitions formed for the purpose include We Are Still In, US Climate Alliance, Climate Mayors and more.

== See also ==
- Climate Mayors
- Under2 Coalition
- United States Climate Alliance
- We Are Still In
- Climate change in the United States
