= Mayors National Climate Action Agenda =

- Membership: 427 US cities

Population
  - Estimate: 67.8 million
- Website http://www.climatemayors.org

Mayors National Climate Action Agenda, or Climate Mayors, is an association of United States mayors with the stated goal of reducing greenhouse gas emissions. Founded by Los Angeles mayor Eric Garcetti, former Houston mayor Annise Parker, and former Philadelphia mayor Michael Nutter, the group represents 435 cities and nearly 20% of the U.S. population.

Founded in 2014, the organization received one million dollars in start-up funding from the Clinton Global Initiative to support the founding mayors' efforts to organize cities in advance of the signing of the 2015 Paris Agreement.

The organization has stated its commitment to upholding the emissions goals of the Paris Agreement on climate change even if the United States withdraws from the agreement.

== Partner cities ==
Sources:

- Alameda, California
- Albany, California
- Albany, New York
- Albany, Oregon
- Albuquerque, New Mexico
- Alexandria, Virginia
- Allentown, Pennsylvania
- Ambler, Pennsylvania
- Amesville, Ohio
- Anchorage, Alaska
- Anderson, South Carolina
- Ann Arbor, Michigan
- Apalachicola, Florida
- Arcata, California
- Ardsley, New York
- Arvin, California
- Asheville, North Carolina
- Aspen, Colorado
- Athens, Ohio
- Atlanta, Georgia
- Austin, Texas
- Baltimore, Maryland
- Bayfield, Wisconsin
- Beaverton, Oregon
- Bellevue, Idaho
- Bellingham, Washington
- Belmont, California
- Berkeley, California
- Bethlehem, Pennsylvania
- Beverly, Massachusetts
- Beverly Hills, California
- Bexley, Ohio
- Binghamton, New York
- Birmingham, Alabama
- Bisbee, Arizona
- Blacksburg, Virginia
- Bloomington, Illinois
- Bloomington, Indiana
- Bloomington, Minnesota
- Boise, Idaho
- Boston, Massachusetts
- Boulder, Colorado
- Bozeman, Montana
- Breckenridge, Colorado
- Bridgeport, Connecticut
- Brighton, New York
- Brisbane, California
- Buchanan, Michigan
- Buffalo, New York
- Burlingame, California
- Burlington, Vermont
- Burnsville, Minnesota
- Cambridge, Massachusetts
- Camuy, Puerto Rico
- Cape Canaveral, Florida
- Cape May Point, New Jersey
- Carmel, Indiana
- Carrboro, North Carolina
- Carson, California
- Carver, Minnesota
- Champaign, Illinois
- Chapel Hill, North Carolina
- Charles Town, West Virginia
- Charleston, South Carolina
- Charlotte, North Carolina
- Charlottesville, Virginia
- Chattanooga, Tennessee
- Cherry Hill, New Jersey
- Chicago, Illinois
- Chula Vista, California
- Cincinnati, Ohio
- Claremont, California
- Clarkston, Georgia
- Cleveland, Ohio
- Coconut Creek, Florida
- College Park, Maryland
- Columbia, Missouri
- Columbia, South Carolina
- Columbus, Ohio
- Concord, New Hampshire
- Conshohocken, Pennsylvania
- Cooperstown, New York
- Coral Gables, Florida
- Corte Madera, California
- Cortland, New York
- Corvallis, Oregon
- Cotati, California
- Crete, Nebraska
- Culver City, California
- Cupertino, California
- Cutler Bay, Florida
- Dallas, Texas
- Daly City, California
- Davis, California
- DeKalb, Illinois
- Delray Beach, Florida
- Denver, Colorado
- Des Moines, Iowa
- Detroit, Michigan
- Dover, New Hampshire
- Downingtown, Pennsylvania
- Dublin, California
- Dubuque, Iowa
- Duluth, Minnesota
- Dunn, Wisconsin
- Duquesne, Pennsylvania
- Durham, North Carolina
- East Brunswick, New Jersey
- East Lansing, Michigan
- Eden Prairie, Minnesota
- Edgewater, Colorado
- Edina, Minnesota
- Edmonds, Washington
- El Cerrito, California
- El Monte, California
- Elburn, Illinois
- Elgin, Illinois
- Emeryville, California
- Encinitas, California
- Erie, Pennsylvania
- Eugene, Oregon
- Evanston, Illinois
- Everett, Washington
- Fairbanks North Star Borough, Alaska
- Fairfax, Virginia
- Fairfield, Iowa
- Falcon Heights, Minnesota
- Falls Church, Virginia
- Fanwood, New Jersey
- Fayetteville, Arkansas
- Ferndale, Michigan
- Flagstaff, Arizona
- Flint, Michigan
- Fort Bragg, California
- Fort Collins, Colorado
- Fort Lauderdale, Florida
- Fort Wayne, Indiana
- Franklin, North Carolina
- Fremont, California
- Fresno, California
- Frisco, Colorado
- Gainesville, Florida
- Gambier, Ohio
- Gary, Indiana
- Gladstone, Oregon
- Glen Rock, New Jersey
- Glendale, California
- Glendale, Wisconsin
- Gloucester, Massachusetts
- Golden, Colorado
- Goleta, California
- Grand Rapids, Michigan
- Greenbelt, Maryland
- Greensboro, North Carolina
- Greenville, South Carolina
- Gulfport, Florida
- Half Moon Bay, California
- Hallandale Beach, Florida
- Hamtramck, Michigan
- Hartford, Connecticut
- Hastings-on-Hudson, New York
- Hawaii County, Hawaii
- Hayward, California
- Healdsburg, California
- Highland Park, New Jersey
- Highland Park, Illinois
- Highlands, North Carolina
- Hillsborough, North Carolina
- Hoboken, New Jersey
- Hollywood, Florida
- Holyoke, Massachusetts
- Honolulu, Hawa'ii
- Hood River, Oregon
- Houston, Texas
- Hudson, New York
- Huron, California
- Hyattsville, Maryland
- Imperial Beach, California
- Iowa City, Iowa
- Irvington, New York
- Ithaca, New York
- Jackson, Michigan
- Jackson, Wyoming
- Jersey City, New Jersey
- Kalamazoo, Michigan
- Kansas City, Missouri
- Kauaʻi County, Hawaii
- Kenosha, Wisconsin
- Ketchum, Idaho
- Kingston, New York
- Kirkland, Washington
- Kissimmee, Florida
- Knoxville, Tennessee
- La Crosse, Wisconsin
- Lafayette, Colorado
- Laguna Woods, California
- Lake George, New York
- Lakewood, Colorado
- Lakewood, Ohio
- Lancaster, Pennsylvania
- Lansing, Michigan
- Lapeer, Michigan
- Las Cruces, New Mexico
- Lauderhill, Florida
- Laurel, Maryland
- Lawrence, Kansas
- Lewes, Delaware
- Little Rock, Arkansas
- Long Beach, California
- Long Branch, New Jersey
- Longmont, Colorado
- Los Altos, California
- Los Altos Hills, California
- Los Angeles, California
- Los Gatos, California
- Louisville, Kentucky
- Lynnwood, Washington
- Macon, Georgia
- Madison, Wisconsin
- Malden, Massachusetts
- Malibu, California
- Manchester, New Hampshire
- Manhattan Beach, California
- Manitou Springs, Colorado
- Maplewood, Minnesota
- Maplewood, Missouri
- Marbletown, New York
- Marlboro, New Jersey
- Martinez, California
- Maui County, Hawaii
- Medford, Massachusetts
- Melrose, Massachusetts
- Memphis, Tennessee
- Menlo Park, California
- Miami, Florida
- Miami Beach, Florida
- Middleton, Wisconsin
- Middletown, Connecticut
- Milford, Connecticut
- Milford, Pennsylvania
- Millbrae, California
- Millcreek, Utah
- Milwaukee, Wisconsin
- Milwaukie, Oregon
- Minneapolis, Minnesota
- Miramar, Florida
- Missoula, Montana
- Moab, Utah
- Monona, Wisconsin
- Montgomery, Illinois
- Montpelier, Vermont
- Mooresville, North Carolina
- Morgantown, West Virginia
- Morristown, New Jersey
- Morro Bay, California
- Mosier, Oregon
- Mount Pocono, Pennsylvania
- Mountain View, California
- Mukilteo, Washington
- Napa, California
- Nashua, New Hampshire
- Nashville, Tennessee
- Nederland, Colorado
- New Bedford, Massachusetts
- New Haven, Connecticut
- New Orleans, Louisiana
- New Paltz, New York
- New York, New York
- Newark, New Jersey
- Newburyport, Massachusetts
- Newport News, Virginia
- Newton, Massachusetts
- Niagara Falls, New York
- Normal, Illinois
- Norman, Oklahoma
- North Bay Village, Florida
- North Brunswick, New Jersey
- North Miami, Florida
- Northampton, Massachusetts
- Nyack, New York
- Oakland, California
- Ojai, California
- Olympia, Washington
- Orlando, Florida
- Ossining, New York
- Palo Alto, California
- Park City, Utah
- Pawtucket, Rhode Island
- Pembroke Pines, Florida
- Petaluma, California
- Philadelphia, Pennsylvania
- Phoenix, Arizona
- Pinecrest, Florida
- Pittsboro, North Carolina
- Pittsburg, Kansas
- Pittsburgh, Pennsylvania
- Pittsfield, Massachusetts
- Plainsboro, New Jersey
- Pleasant Ridge, Michigan
- Pompano Beach, Florida
- Port Townsend, Washington
- Portland, Maine
- Portland, Oregon
- Portsmouth, New Hampshire
- Princeton, New Jersey
- Providence, Rhode Island
- Raleigh, North Carolina
- Rancho Cordova, California
- Redmond, Washington
- Redwood City, California
- Rehoboth Beach, Delaware
- Reno, Nevada
- Richmond, California
- Richmond, Virginia
- Rochester, Minnesota
- Rochester, New York
- Rockaway Beach, Oregon
- Rockford, Illinois
- Rockwood, Michigan
- Rohnert Park, California
- Royal Oak, Michigan
- Sacramento, California
- Saint Helena, California
- Saint Paul, Minnesota
- Salem, Massachusetts
- Salem, Oregon
- Salisbury, Maryland
- Salt Lake City, Utah
- San Antonio, Texas
- San Carlos, California
- San Diego, California
- San Fernando, California
- San Francisco, California
- San Jose, California
- San Leandro, California
- San Luis Obispo, California
- San Marcos, Texas
- San Mateo, California
- Santa Ana, California
- Santa Barbara, California
- Santa Clara, California
- Santa Cruz, California
- Santa Fe, New Mexico
- Santa Monica, California
- Santa Rosa, California
- Sarasota, Florida
- Saratoga Springs, New York
- Satellite Beach, Florida
- Savanna, Illinois
- Seattle, Washington
- Secaucus, New Jersey
- Skokie, Illinois
- Sleepy Hollow, New York
- Smithville, Texas
- Snoqualmie, Washington
- Somerset, Maryland
- Somerville, Massachusetts
- Somersworth, New Hampshire
- Sonoma, California
- South Bend, Indiana
- South Miami, Florida
- South Orange Village, New Jersey
- South Portland, Maine
- Springfield, Massachusetts
- St. Louis Park, Minnesota
- St. Louis, Missouri
- St. Peters, Missouri
- St. Petersburg, Florida
- Stamford, Connecticut
- State College, Pennsylvania
- Stockton, California
- Sunnyvale, California
- Sunrise, Florida
- Surfside, Florida
- Swarthmore, Pennsylvania
- Swedesboro, New Jersey
- Syracuse, New York
- Tacoma, Washington
- Takoma Park, Maryland
- Tallahassee, Florida
- Tampa, Florida
- Tarrytown, New York
- Telluride, Colorado
- Tempe, Arizona
- Toledo, Ohio
- Torrance, California
- Traverse City, Michigan
- Trenton, New Jersey
- Tualatin, Oregon
- Tucson, Arizona
- Tukwila, Washington
- Union City, New Jersey
- University City, Missouri
- Urbana, Illinois
- Vail, Colorado
- Vancouver, Washington
- Venice, Florida
- Ventura, California
- Verona, New Jersey
- Washington, D.C.
- Watsonville, California
- Waukegan, Illinois
- West Hartford, Connecticut
- West Haven, Connecticut
- West Hollywood, California
- West Lafayette, Indiana
- West Linn, Oregon
- West New York, New Jersey
- West Palm Beach, Florida
- West Sacramento, California
- West Wendover, Nevada
- Westland, Michigan
- Westminster, Colorado
- Weston, Florida
- Wheat Ridge, Colorado
- White Plains, New York
- Whitefish, Montana
- Whitney Point, New York
- Windsor, California
- Windsor Heights, Iowa
- Winston-Salem, North Carolina
- Woodland, California
- Woodside, California
- Woodstock, Illinois
- Worcester, Massachusetts
- Yonkers, New York
- Ypsilanti, Michigan

== See also ==
- United States withdrawal from the Paris Agreement
- United States Climate Alliance, a group of states committing to Paris Agreement goals
- Under2 MOU
