= Grzegorz Tobiszowski =

Polish politician (born 1965)

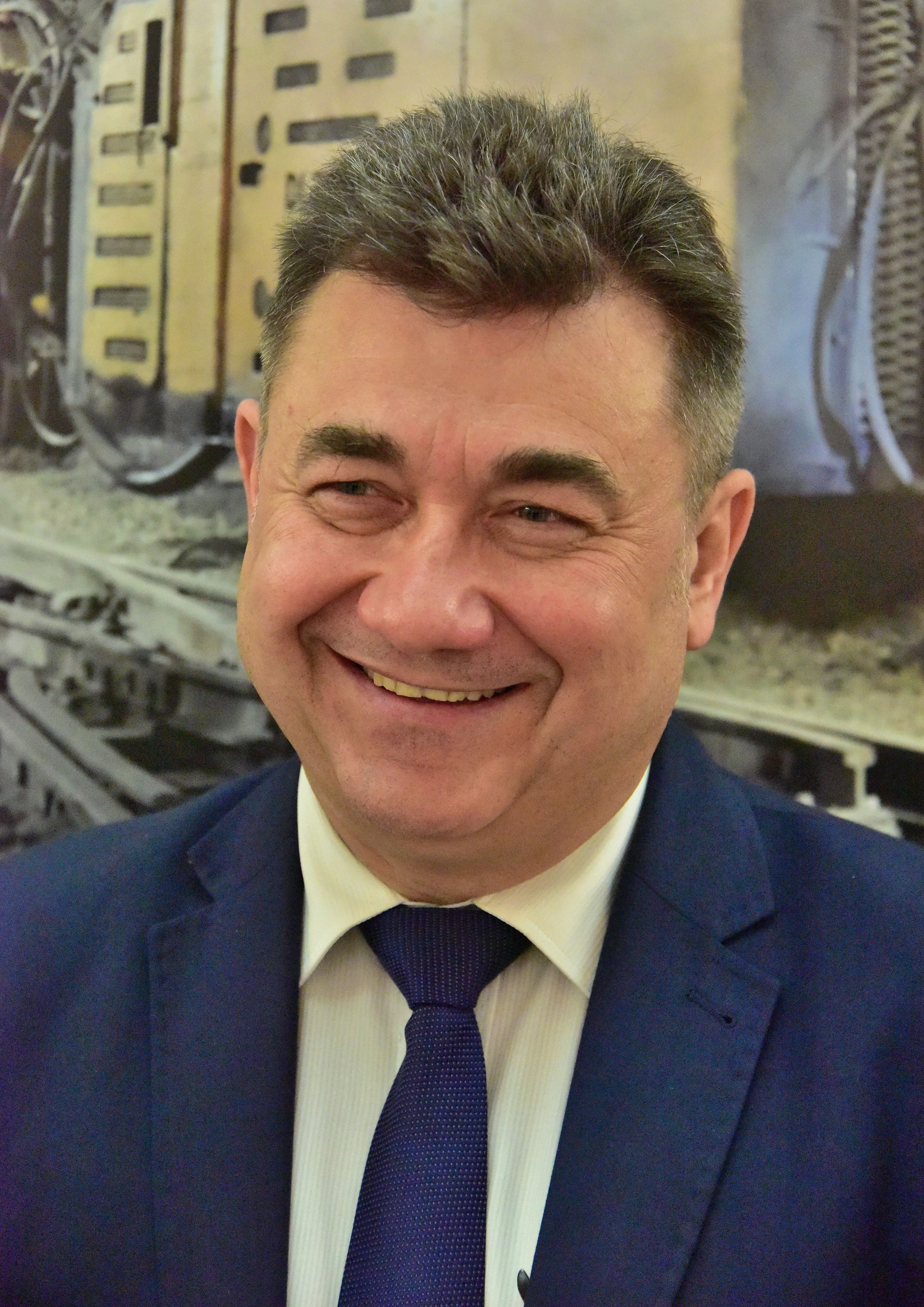

Member of the Sejm
- Incumbent
- Assumed office 25 September 2005
- Constituency: 31 – Katowice

Personal details
- Born: 1965 (age 60–61)
- Party: Law and Justice
- Spouse: Dorota Tobiszowska
- Education: John Paul II Catholic University of Lublin
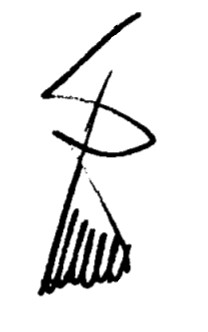
- Signature
- Website: tobiszowski.pl

Grzegorz Józef Tobiszowski (born 1 November 1965 in Ruda Śląska) is a Polish politician. He was elected to the Sejm on 25 September 2005, getting 7662 votes in 31 Katowice district as a candidate from the Law and Justice list.

Tobiszowski was one of the few politicians in Europe who praised the United States withdrawal from the Paris Agreement in 2017.

== See also ==
- Members of Polish Sejm 2005-2007
