= Executive Order 14162 =

2025 withdrawal from climate commitments

- "Putting America First In International Environmental Agreements"
- Front page of Executive Order 14162
- Type: Executive order
- Number: 14162
- President: Donald Trump
- Signed: January 20, 2025

Federal Register details
- Federal Register document number: 2025-02010
- Publication date: January 20, 2025

Summary
- Orders the withdrawal of the United States from the Paris Agreement and related international climate commitments

Executive Order 14162, titled "Putting America First In International Environmental Agreements", is an executive order signed by United States president Donald Trump on January 20, 2025, during the first day of his second presidential term. The order directed the immediate withdrawal of the United States from the Paris Agreement and other international climate commitments.

The executive order marked the second time the United States had withdrawn from the Paris Agreement, following the previous withdrawal during Trump's first presidential term.

== Provisions ==
The order directed the United States Ambassador to the United Nations to immediately notify the Secretary-General of the United Nations's withdrawal from the Paris Agreement, implemented under the United Nations Framework Convention on Climate Change (UNFCCC). This withdrawal was designated to take effect immediately upon notification. It also directed the termination of all the United States' financial commitments made under the UNFCCC, including the U.S. International Climate Finance Plan, requiring the Office of Management and Budget to issue guidance for releasing frozen funds within ten days.

The order established a review process requiring multiple federal departments and agencies to report on their actions towards revoking policies implemented under the International Climate Finance Plan. It also established new priorities for international energy agreements, emphasizing "economic efficiency, the promotion of American prosperity, consumer choice, and fiscal restraint in all foreign engagements that concern energy policy".

== Reactions ==
Several environmental organizations and climate researchers expressed immediate and strong opposition to the order's withdrawal from the Paris Agreement. The Union of Concerned Scientists characterized the decision as a "travesty" that prioritized fossil fuel industry profits over public health and welfare. The Sierra Club emphasized America's moral obligation to lead global emissions reduction efforts, particularly given its status as the largest historical emitter. Many experts and analysts also expressed concern about the order prompting other nations to reconsider their international climate commitments.

Former White House national climate advisor Gina McCarthy described the order's withdrawal from the Paris Agreement as the Trump administration abdicating "its responsibility to protect the American people and our national security".

Key developer of the Paris Agreement Laurence Tubiana described the withdrawal as "unfortunate", but expressed hope towards the ability of climate actions made by the international community.

== See also ==
- List of executive orders in the second presidency of Donald Trump
- United States and the Paris Agreement
