= Climate Group =

UK climate change organization

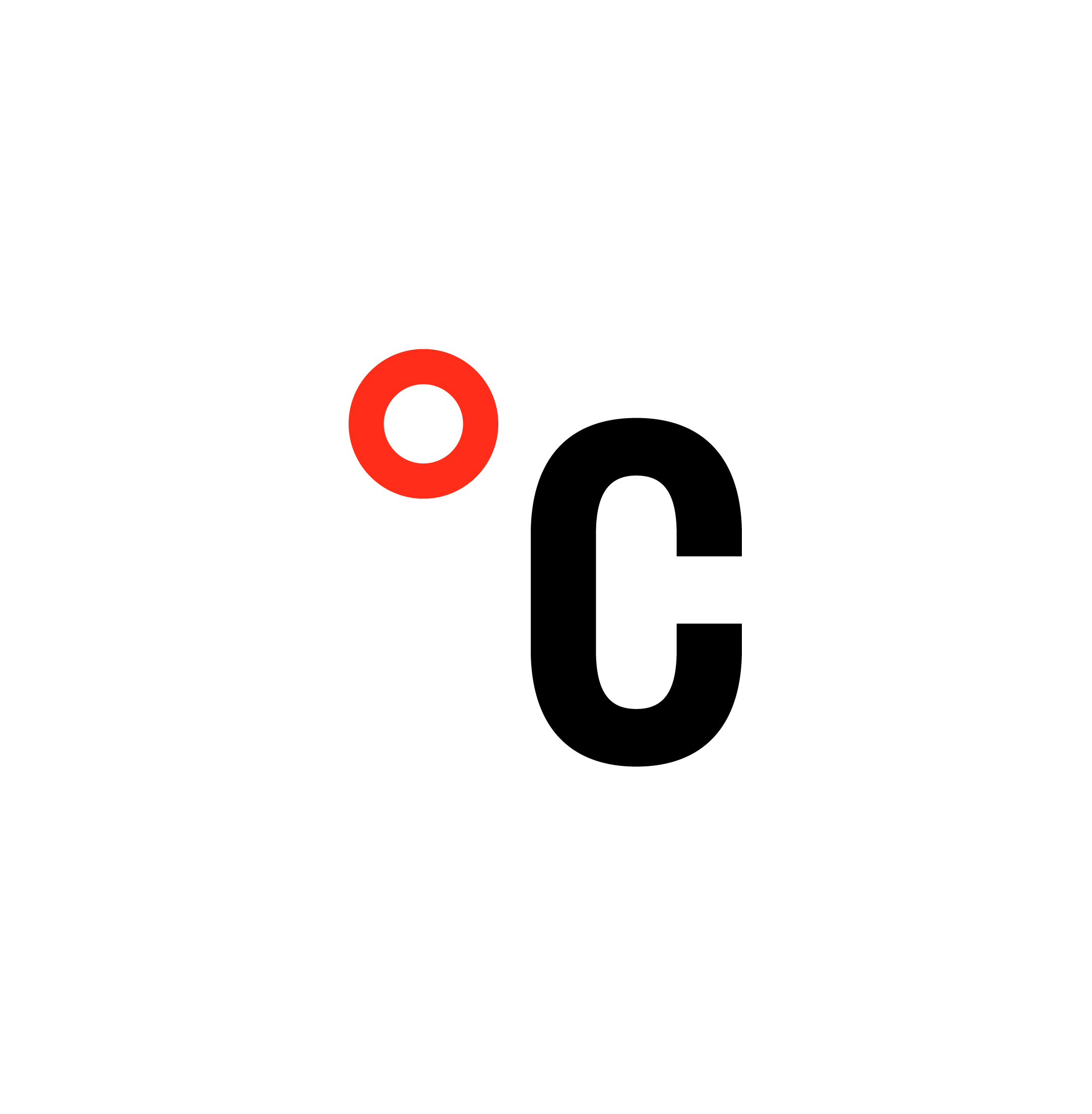
- Founded: 2004
- Type: Environmental charity
- Purpose: Climate change
- Location(s): Headquartered in London with offices in Europe, North America, India, and China.
- Region served: International
- Website: www.theclimategroup.org

Climate Group is a nonprofit organisation aiming to achieve a world of net zero carbon emissions by 2050.

The organisation operates globally with offices in the United Kingdom (headquarters), Europe, North America, India, and China. Climate Group acts as the secretariat for the Under2 Coalition, the largest alliance of state and regional governments around the world that are committed to reducing their greenhouse gas emissions to net zero levels by 2050 or earlier. As of 2024, the Under2 Coalition includes 178 subnational governments with a wider network of national governments and regional associations that represent 1.75 billion people and 50% of the world economy.

== History ==
Climate Group was founded in 2003 and launched in 2004 by Prime Minister Tony Blair, ex-CEO and co-founder, Steve Howard together with ex-Chief Operating Officer, Jim Walker and former Communications Director, Alison Lucas. Former Governor of California, Arnold Schwarzenegger, also supported the group at its launch. It evolved from research led by the Rockefeller Brothers Fund and was established to encourage more major companies and subnational governments to take climate action.

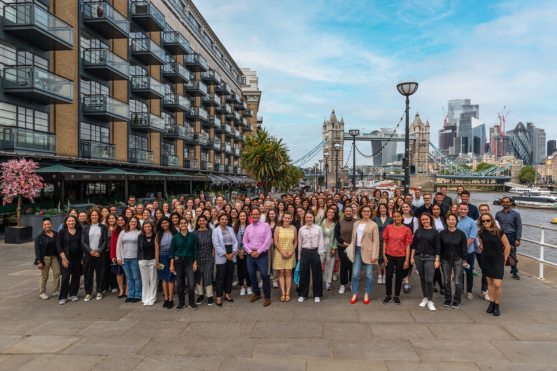
Climate Group staff at the London office in 2022

The first US office opened in 2006 in Oakland, California, followed by a New York office in 2007. Additional offices opened in Beijing, Brussels and Hong Kong in 2008, India in 2009, and Amsterdam in 2022.

In 2005, Climate Group launched the States and Regions Alliance at COP11 in Montreal, connecting state, regional, provincial and subnational governments from around the world, to establish an international network for knowledge sharing and driving climate action. In May 2015, in the runup to COP21, the Under2 Coalition was formed by the governments of California and Baden-Württemberg to mobilise and galvanise bold climate action from like-minded city, state and regional governments around the globe.

In 2009, Climate Group held its first Climate Week NYC summit to help drive ambition for a new global agreement at COP15 in Copenhagen. Climate Group first ventured in work around electric vehicles with EV20, a global initiative designed to accelerate the deployment of electric cars, also at COP15.

In 2011, Mark Kenber took over from Steve Howard as CEO. In 2017, Helen Clarkson became CEO, following Mark Kenber's resignation in 2016. SteelZero publicly launched with an initial group of committed corporates on 1 December 2020, followed by ConcreteZero which launched in July 2022. Later that year, in September, EV100+ launched, an extension of the EV100 programme focused on the transition of medium- and heavy-duty vehicles (MHDVs), to zero emission by 2040.

The current chair of Climate Group UK board is Mike Rann AC, CNZM.

== Events ==
Throughout the year, Climate Group hosts a range of global events, including Climate Week NYC, the largest annual climate event of its kind, bringing together some 600 events and activities across the City of New York – in person, hybrid, and online. The event takes place alongside the United Nations General Assembly, and is run in coordination with the United Nations and City of New York, allowing heads of state and other senior governmental figures to attend and participate.

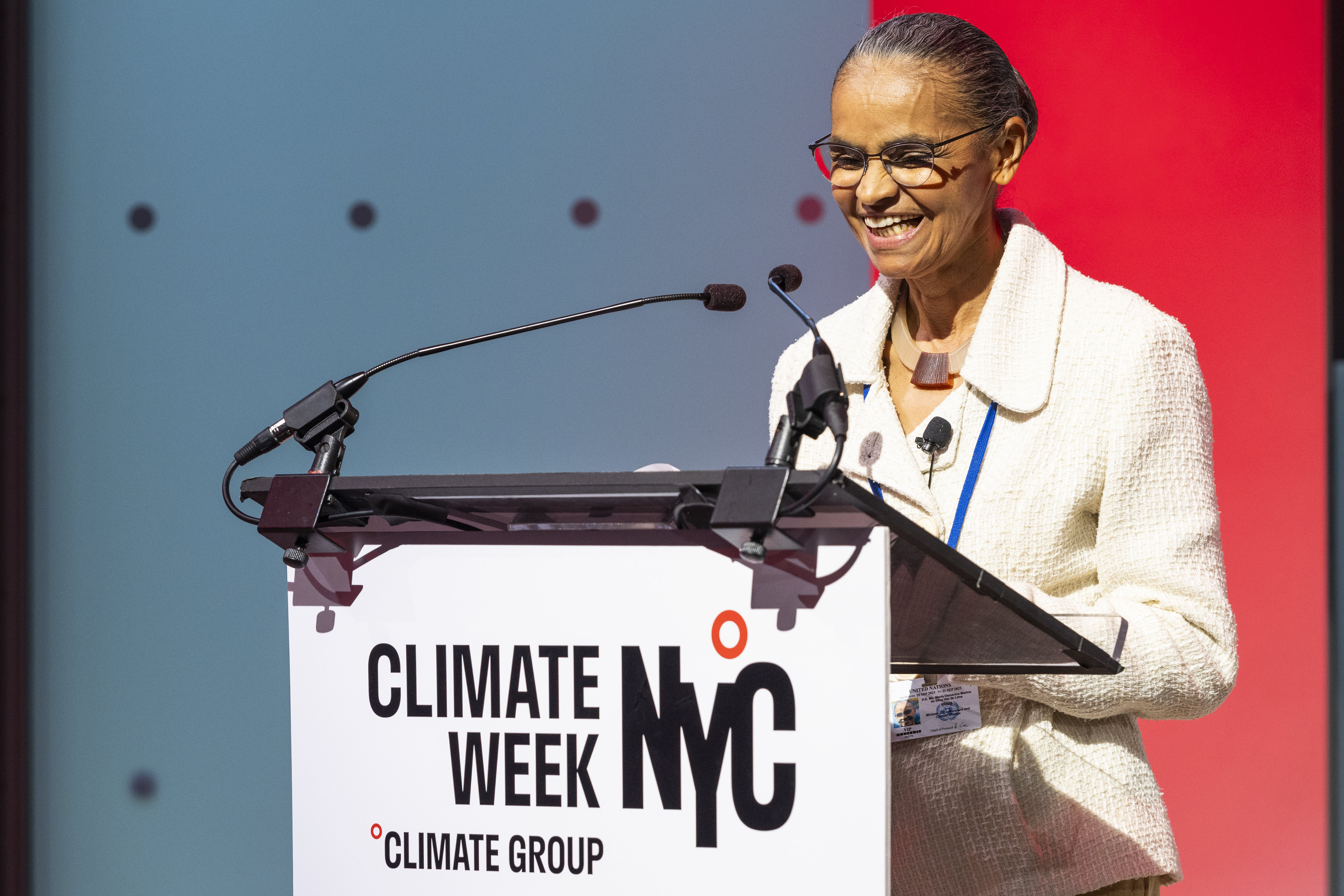
Marina Silva, Minister of the Environment and Climate Change of Brazil, at Climate Week NYC's Opening Ceremony in 2023

Hosted every September since 2009, the event brings together international leaders from business, government, and civil society to showcase global climate action. In 2024, Climate Week NYC saw 212 speakers from around the world, and over 6,000 in-person and virtual attendees. The wider week included over 900 events hosted across the city. This was the largest Climate Group summit to date, with a media reach of 31.6 billion and more than 955 million impressions of #ClimateWeekNYC.

Climate Group also hosts the US Climate Action Summit, and Climate Group Asia Action Summit, bringing together regional leaders and industry experts to drive impactful climate action.

The US Climate Action Summit was launched in 2021 to unite key leaders in business, politics and the third sector to drive US climate momentum. The event takes place in Washington DC providing an action-led platform that drives measurable outcomes on climate policy and business action, with attendees at the heart of the agenda. The Leaders’ Forum, the flagship event of the summit, brings together over 200 climate leaders for an agenda curated to facilitate big conversations on stage while allowing leaders to drill into the detail during closed-door workshops and roundtables.

== COP ==
Climate Group consistently plays an active role in the COP process, largely through the work of the Under2 Coalition and its states and regions. The first Under2 Coalition General Assembly was held at COP21 in Marrakech in November 2016. Since then, it has met every year to maximise opportunities for multilevel working between national and regional governments across the world. The main focus of UN climate talks at COP29 was finance, specifically how much is needed to keep the world within the 1.5C degree limit. With extreme weather conditions, from wildfires to floods, damaging infrastructure and impacting lives, climate finance is more critical than ever. After intense negotiations, developed countries pledged US $300 billion annually, with the goal of scaling up to $1.3 trillion by 2035. However, this year’s talks failed to take action on a decision to transition away from fossil fuels, a commitment made by nations at UN climate talks in Dubai in 2023.

2023 United Nations Climate Change Conference In 2023, at COP28, members and signatories of the Under2 Coalition made a range of high-profile announcements and commitments to mitigate climate change. For example, Catalonia and California launched a global partnership for the adaptation and mitigation of climate change, Scotland committed to new funding for clean and reliable energy in three African countries, and New South Wales published a series of policy compendium on nature-based solutions through the Net Zero Futures Policy Forum, identifying examples of progress and best practice across Australia.

== Membership ==
Climate group claims to bring together a global network of over 800 businesses, governments, and signatories.

=== Member achievements ===
Over 420 members are already driving enough renewable electricity demand to power a country larger than France.

Almost 130 of the world's companies are committed across almost 100 markets are working to transition their fleets to EV and install EV charging for staff and customers by 2030. That's 5.6 million vehicles committed by 2030.

CO2 emissions have been reduced by more than 320 million metric tonnes thanks to energy efficiency measures taken by over 120 members. That's more than the current annual emissions of France and Switzerland combined.

== Climate Group Programmes ==
Climate Group has key systems of focus including energy, transport, heavy industry and food. Programmes include:

RE100

RE100 is a global initiative bringing together the world's most influential companies leading the transition to 100% renewable electricity. Its mission is to accelerate change towards zero carbon grids at scale and send a powerful demand signal to policymakers and investors to help address market challenges.

EP100

EP100 is a global corporate energy efficiency initiative bringing together ambitious businesses committed to measuring and reporting on efficiency improvements. To date, EP100 members have saved US$1.2 billion whilst reducing their emissions by more than the annual emissions of Denmark, Italy and Portugal combined.

EV100

EV100 is a global initiative bringing together companies committed to accelerating the transition to electric vehicles (EVs) and making electric transport the new normal by 2030. EV100 members are increasing demand for EVs, influencing policy, and driving mass roll-out, helping to make EVs more rapidly affordable for everyone.

EV100+ was launched in 2022. It's an initiative of companies committed to transitioning their fleet of vehicles over 7.5 tonnes, known as medium- and heavy-duty vehicles (MHDVs), to zero emissions by 2040 in OECD markets, China, and India.

The Future Fund, launched in 2017, has raised US$1million from Under2 Coalition members and delivered 15 directly funded capacity building projects, supported 21 secondments, welcomed 88 regions from developing and emerging economies to the Under2 Coalition and enabled 65 regional representatives to join international climate events, such as COPs and Climate Week NYC.

== Funding ==
Climate Group functions independently of any corporate and government entities and funds its work from a variety of revenue streams. Its 2004 launch was supported primarily by philanthropic organisations, including the Rockefeller Brothers Fund, the DOEN Foundation, the John D and Catherine T. MacArthur Foundation, and the Esmee Fairbairn Foundation. Climate Group is registered with the Fundraising Regulator Climate Group's 2022-2023 annual report indicated the three primary funding streams were; government and foundation grants (50%), sponsorship income for our events including Climate Week NYC plus other smaller events (25%), and membership and partnership income (25%).
