= Kelly J. Henning =

American epidemiologist

Kelly J. Henning is an epidemiologist and medical doctor currently leading the public health program of Bloomberg Philanthropies. She has led the program since it began in 2007. She was the first person to serve as director of epidemiology for the New York City Department of Health and Mental Hygiene. Henning said of working in public health "I have the opportunity to help improve the health and lives of millions of people. That's what really speaks to me."

== Career ==
Henning received her MD from Tufts University School of Medicine and completed internal medicine training at the University of Pennsylvania where she also served as an associate professor of infectious diseases and hospital epidemiology. She completed her epidemiology training at the U.S. Center for Disease Control and Prevention Epidemic Intelligence Service in 1988.

Henning served as the first director of the epidemiology division of New York City's Department of Health and Mental Hygiene from 2003 to 2006. Since 2007, she has led the public health program of Bloomberg Philanthropies, the foundation established by former New York City Mayor Mike Bloomberg. Priorities for the program include devoting $1 billion to curbing tobacco use in poorer countries, reducing the number of preventable traffic injuries and deaths around the world, and helping countries to improve public health data collection with the goal of addressing public health problems."

Henning characterized the work on curbing tobacco use as focused on "demand reduction." She described this as "smoke-free public places, advertising bans, availability of cessation services, pack warnings, and other ways of educating the public, and perhaps most importantly raising taxes on tobacco because price is one of the key drivers to helping people quit and not start using tobacco."

On the wider work with Bloomberg Philanthropies on noncommunicable diseases, Henning told NPR: "Cancer, heart attacks, stroke, chronic lung disease: this is a group of diseases that cause more than 40 million deaths a year."

Henning has contributed to more than 30 peer-reviewed research publications and presented at more than 11 national scientific meetings. She has been invited to deliver more than 28 lectures or lead discussions on a range of topics including bioterrorism, pandemic flu and smallpox.

== Selected publications ==
- Henning KJ, Pollack DM, Friedman SM. A neonatal hepatitis B surveillance and vaccination program: New York City, 1987 to 1988. Am J Public Health. 1992;82:885-888
- Frieden TR, Sowell AL, Henning KJ, Huff DL, Gunn. Vitamin A levels and severity of measles. New York City. Amer J Dis Child. 1992;146:182-186
- Henning KJ, Jean-Baptiste E, Singh T, Hill RH, Friedman SM. Eosinophilia-myalgia syndrome in patients ingesting a single source of L-tryptophan. J Rheumatol. 1993;20:273-278
- Back EE, Henning KJ, Kallenbach LR, Brix KA, Gunn RA, Melius JM. Risk factors for developing eosinophilia myalgia syndrome among L-tryptophan users in New York. J Rheumatol. 1993;20:666-672
- Henning KJ, Bell E, Braun J, Blum S. A community-wide outbreak of hepatitis A: risk factors for infection among homosexual and bisexual men. Am J Med. 1995;99:132-136
- Henning KJ, DeLencastre H, Eagan J, et al. Vancomycin-resistant Enterococcus faecium on a pediatric oncology ward: duration of stool shedding and incidence of clinical infection. Pediatr Infect Dis J. 1996;15:848-54
- Henning KJ, White M, Sepkowitz K, Armstrong DA. A national survey of immunization practices following allogeneic bone marrow transplantation. JAMA. 1997; 277:1148–1151.
- Henning KJ, Hall EL, Dwyer DM, Billman L, Schuchat A, Johnson JA, Harrison LH. Invasive Group B streptococcal disease in Maryland nursing home residents. J Infect Dis. 2001; 183:1138–1142.
- Henning KJ, Brennan PJ, Hoegg C, O'Rourke E, Dyer BD, Grace TL. Health system preparedness for bioterrorism: bringing the tabletop to the hospital. Infect Control Hosp Epidemiol. 2004;25:146-155
- Henning KJ, What is syndromic surveillance? Morbidity and Mortality Weekly Report (Supplement). 2004;53:7-11
- Frieden TR, Das-Douglas M, Kellerman SE, Henning KJ. Applying public health principles to the HIV epidemic. N Engl J Med. 2005; 353:2397–2401
- Myers JE, Henning KJ, Frieden TR, Larson K, Begier B, Sepkowitz KA. Written consent for human immunodeficiency virus testing. Public Health Rep. 2007;122:433-4.
- Larson K, Henning KJ, Peden M. Editorial: The importance of data for global road safety. Traffic Injury Prevention. 2012; 13 (S1):3-4.
- Larson K, Henning KJ. Implementing proven road safety interventions saves lives. Injury Int. J. Care Injured. 2013; 44 (S4):S3
