= United States and the Paris Agreement =

United States and climate change treaty

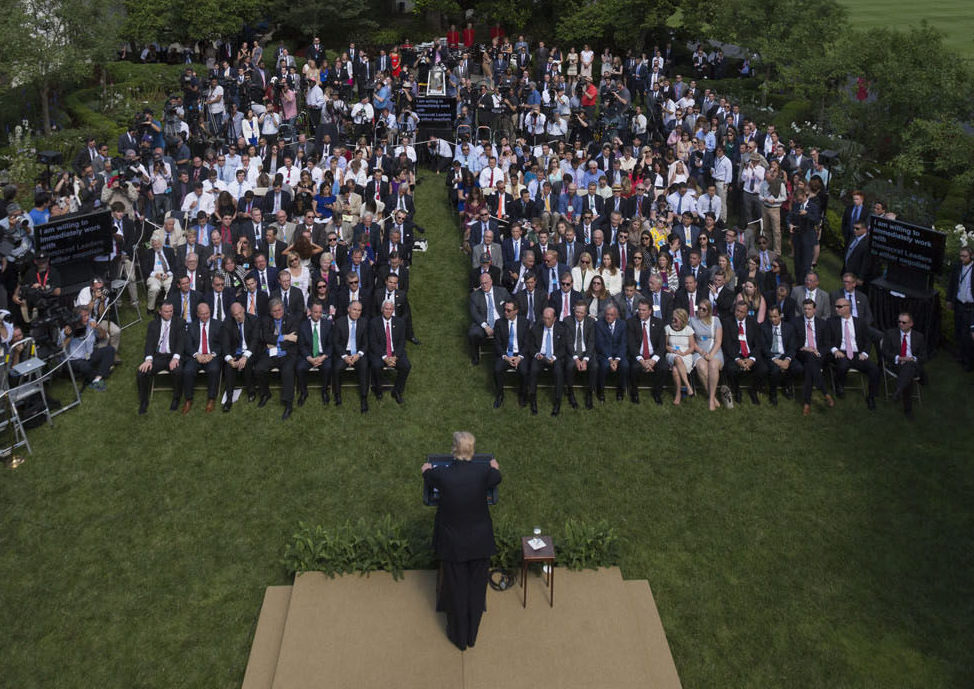
Trump announcing the first withdrawal during a press conference at the White House Rose Garden

In April 2016, the United States became a signatory to the Paris Agreement on climate change mitigation, and accepted it by executive order in September 2016. President Barack Obama committed the United States to contributing US$3 billion to the Green Climate Fund. On June 1, 2017, U.S. president Donald Trump announced that the United States would cease all participation in the 2015 Paris Agreement on climate change mitigation, contending that the agreement would "undermine" the U.S. economy, and put the U.S. "at a permanent disadvantage".

In accordance with Article 28 of the Paris Agreement, a country cannot give notice of withdrawal from the agreement within the first three years of its start date in the relevant country, which was on November 4, 2016, in the case of the United States. The White House later clarified that the U.S. would abide by the four-year exit process. On November 4, 2019, the administration gave a formal notice of intention to withdraw, which takes 12 months to take effect. The withdrawal took effect on November 4, 2020, one day after the 2020 U.S. presidential election. However, the U.S. still has to report its greenhouse gas inventory because it remains in the UNFCCC.

The decision to withdraw the U.S. was backed by many Republicans but was strongly opposed by Democrats. However, it was strongly criticized in the U.S. and abroad by environmentalists, religious organizations, business leaders, and scientists. According to polls released in 2019, a majority of Americans opposed the withdrawal. Following Trump's announcement, the governors of several U.S. states formed the U.S. Climate Alliance to continue to advance the objectives of the Paris Agreement at the state level despite the federal withdrawal. As of July 1, 2019, 24 states, American Samoa, and Puerto Rico have joined the alliance, and similar commitments have also been expressed by other state governors, mayors, and businesses. The withdrawal from the Paris Agreement impacted other countries by reducing its financial aid to the Green Climate fund. The termination of the $3 billion U.S. funding ultimately impacted climate change research and decreased society's chance of reaching the Paris Agreement goals, as well as omitted U.S. contributions to the future IPCC reports. It also affected the carbon emission space as well as the carbon price. The U.S.'s withdrawal also meant that the spot to take over the global climate regime was obtainable for China and the EU.

Following the 2020 presidential election, President-elect Joe Biden vowed to rejoin the Paris Agreement on his first day in office. On January 20, 2021, shortly after his inauguration, President Biden signed an executive order to rejoin the agreement. The United States formally rejoined the Paris Agreement on February 19, 2021, 107 days after the withdrawal took effect. On January 20, 2025, shortly after his second inauguration, President Trump signed an executive order to withdraw the United States from the agreement for a second time.

== Background and ratification ==
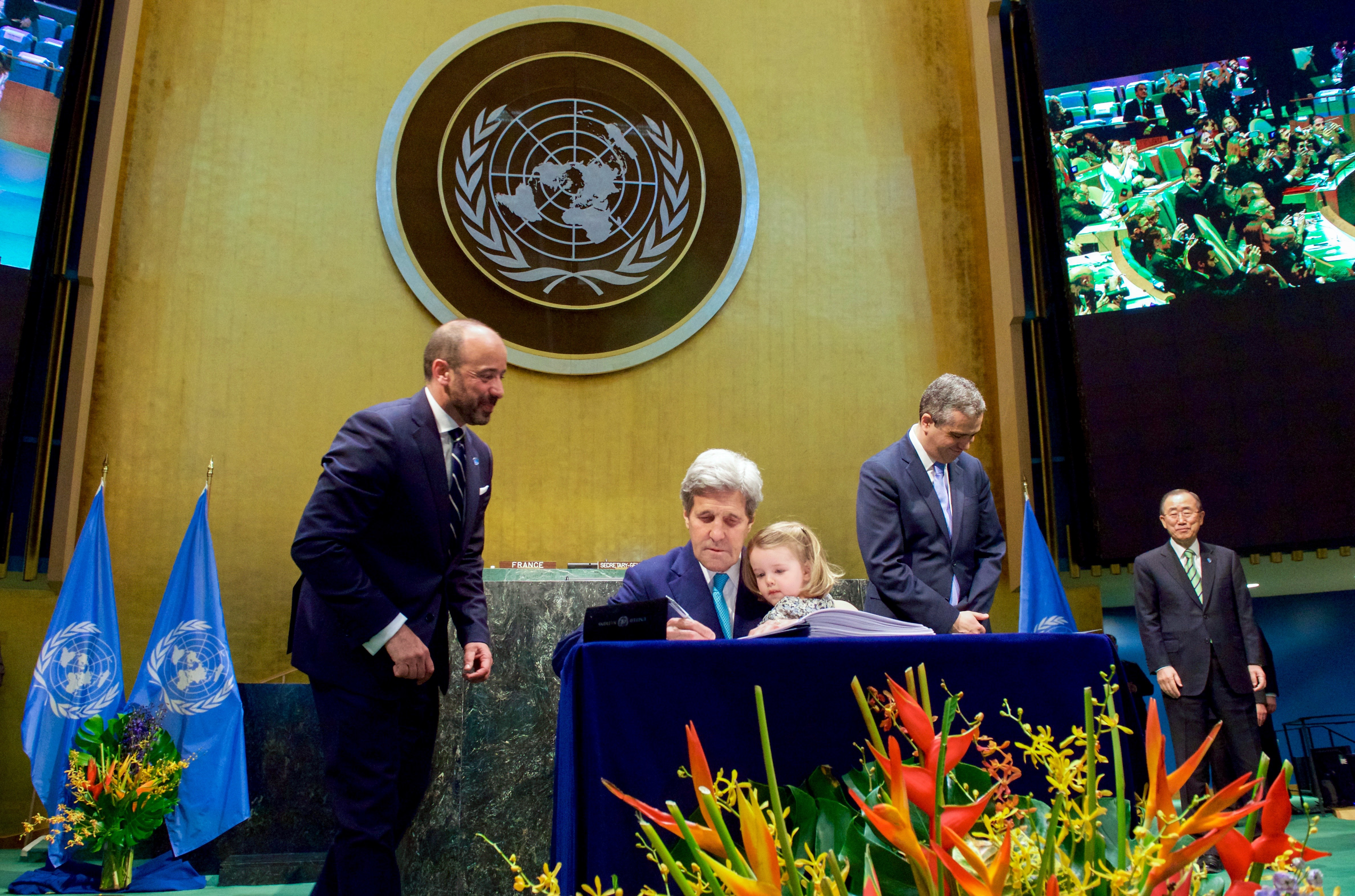
Then-United States secretary of state John Kerry signs the Paris Agreement on Earth Day, 2016

Global carbon dioxide emissions by country in 2023:
1. China (31.8%)
2. United States (14.4%)
3. European Union (4.90%)
4. India (9.50%)
5. Russia (5.80%)
6. Japan (3.50%)
7. Other (30.1%)

The Paris Agreement was an addition to the United Nations Framework Convention on Climate Change (UNFCCC), initially agreed to by all 195 countries present at the 2015 United Nations Climate Change Conference in December of that year, including the United States then under the presidency of Barack Obama. Due to the status of the United States and China as the greatest emitters of carbon dioxide, Obama's support and his cooperation with China were seen as major factors leading to the convention's early success.

The main aim of the Agreement is to hold the increase in the global average temperature to well below 2 °C above pre-industrial levels", predominantly by reducing greenhouse gas emissions. The Agreement differs from the 1997 Kyoto Protocol, the last widely adopted amendment to the UNFCCC, in that no annexes are established to lessen responsibility of developing nations. Rather, emissions targets for each nation were separately negotiated and are to be voluntarily enforced, leading United States officials to regard the Paris Agreement as an executive agreement rather than a legally binding treaty. This removed the requirement for the United States Congress to ratify the agreement.

In April 2016, the United States became a signatory to the Paris Agreement, and accepted it by executive order in September 2016. President Obama committed the United States to contributing US$3 billion to the Green Climate Fund. The Fund has set itself a goal of raising $100 billion a year by 2020.

== First withdrawal ==
Article 28 of the agreement enables parties to withdraw from the agreement after sending a withdrawal notification to the depositary, but notice can be given no earlier than three years after the agreement goes into force for the country. Withdrawal is effective one year after the depositary is notified. Alternatively, the Agreement stipulates that withdrawal from the UNFCCC, under which the Paris Agreement was adopted, would also withdraw the state from the Paris Agreement. The conditions for withdrawal from the UNFCCC are the same as for the Paris Agreement.

On November 8, 2016, four days after the Paris Agreement entered into force in the United States, Donald Trump of the Republican Party was elected President of the United States. Many conservative Republicans dispute the level of human involvement in climate change. Trump rejects the scientific consensus on climate change and tweeted in 2012 that he believed the concept of global warming was created by China in order to impair American competitiveness. During Trump's 2016 election campaign, Trump promised to revitalize the coal industry, which he claimed has been hampered by environmental regulations. It has been argued that this contributed to the support he enjoyed from crucial swing states. His opposition to climate change mitigation was unchanged in the first months of his presidency, in which he issued an executive order to reverse Obama's Clean Power Plan and other environmental regulations.

States from which 22 Republican Senators wrote a letter to President Trump urging a withdrawal on May 25, 2017: Single Senator Both Senators

In April 2017, a group of 20 members of the European Parliament from the right-wing Alternative for Germany, UK Independence Party, and other parties sent a letter to Trump on urging him to withdraw from the Paris Agreement. On May 25, 2017, 22 Republican Senators, including Senate Majority Leader Mitch McConnell, sent a two-page letter to Trump urging him to withdraw the U.S. from the Paris Agreement. The letter was drafted by Senator John Barrasso, the chairman of the Senate Committee on Environment and Public Works, and Senator Jim Inhofe, known for his longtime climate change denial. Most of signatories to the letter were elected from states reliant on the burning of fossil fuels (coal, oil and gas); the group of 22 senators had collectively received more than $10 million in campaign contributions from fossil-fuels companies in the previous three election cycles. Earlier the same week, a group of 40 Democratic Senators sent Trump a letter urging him to keep America in the Paris Agreement, writing that "a withdrawal would hurt America's credibility and influence on the world stage."

Both support for the move and opposition to it were reported among Trump's cabinet and advisers: Secretary of Energy Rick Perry, Secretary of State Rex Tillerson, economic advisor Gary Cohn, and advisor and son-in-law Jared Kushner reportedly wanted the United States to remain committed to the agreement, while White House Advisor Steve Bannon, White House Counsel Don McGahn, and EPA Administrator Scott Pruitt wanted the United States to abandon it.

During the G7 summit in late May 2017, Trump was the only G7 member not to reconfirm commitment to the Paris Agreement. German Chancellor Angela Merkel, one of the other leaders present, was publicly unimpressed with Trump's refusal to cooperate on climate change mitigation, which was seen to damage Germany–United States relations. The communique issued at the conclusion of the summit stated that the United States "is not in a position to join the consensus" of the other G7 countries on policies regarding climate change and the Paris Agreement.

=== Announcement ===
President Trump announces the United States' withdrawal from the Paris Agreement on climate change in the Rose Garden on June 1, 2017.

Video published by the White House about withdrawal from the agreement. The French Foreign ministry released an edited version, with "fact checks".

In a televised announcement from the White House Rose Garden on June 1, 2017, Trump said, "In order to fulfill my solemn duty to protect the United States and its citizens, the United States will withdraw from the Paris climate accord," adding "The bottom line is that the Paris accord is very unfair at the highest level to the United States." He claimed that the agreement, if implemented, would cost the United States $3 trillion in lost GDP and 6.5 million jobs. He added that it would "undermine our economy, hamstring our workers," and "effectively decapitate our coal industry". He said he was open to renegotiating the arrangement or negotiating a new one, but European and UN leaders said the pact "cannot be renegotiated at the request of a single party". Trump also criticized the Green Climate Fund, calling it a scheme to redistribute wealth from rich to poor countries.

The White House said that Trump would end the implementation of carbon reduction targets set by former President Barack Obama and that the withdrawal would be done in accordance with the years-long exit process spelled out in the accord. On September 16, 2017, a European official said the Trump administration had appeared to soften its stance on withdrawing the agreement. The White House told the press that it had not changed its position on the agreement.

Examinations of Trump's speech by The Washington Post and The New York Times pointed to numerous fallacies, including, but not limited to, claims that the U.S., under the Paris Agreement, was forbidden to build coal power plants; that a difference of 0.2 degrees Celsius is insignificant in climatology; that U.S. contributions to the Green Climate Fund were paid out of the U.S. defense budget; projections that the U.S. is on course to become the "cleanest" nation on earth; and Trump's reiterated claim of personal support for environmental causes.

=== Process ===
In accordance with Article 28 of the Paris Agreement, the United States could only file its notice of intent to withdraw no earlier than November 4, 2019, three years after the Agreement had come into effect, which would be effective one year later. Until the withdrawal took effect, the United States was obligated to maintain its commitments under the Agreement, including the requirement to continue reporting its emissions to the United Nations. According to a memo obtained by HuffPost believed to be written by U.S. State Department legal office, any "attempts to withdraw from the Paris Agreement outside of the above-described withdrawal provisions would be inconsistent with international law and would not be accepted internationally."

On August 4, 2017, the Trump administration formally outlined its intention of the withdrawal in an official notice delivered to the United Nations as depositary. In a separate statement, the State Department said it will continue participating in international climate change negotiations, including talks aimed at implementing the climate deal.

The United States filed its intent to withdraw at the earliest possible date, on November 4, 2019. After the one-year period, on November 4, 2020, the U.S. formally withdrew from the Agreement, on the day following the 2020 U.S. presidential election but rejoined the agreement when President Biden took office.

=== Effects ===
The Obama administration was responsible for funding $3 billion U.S. dollars to the Green Climate Fund, that will no longer be available to be used towards climate change research. Therefore, a decrease in funds by the U.S. will lessen the chances of being able to reach the Paris Agreement goals. In addition, the U.S. was responsible for more than 50% of the papers references for climate change in 2015, so a cut in funding will impact U.S's contribution to any further IPCC reports. Trump's termination of its funding to the Green Climate Fund can also have an impact on underdeveloped countries that are in need of that aid for their climate change projects. The U.S. withdrawal decision leaves a large gap in the climate aid that the developed countries have promised to the developing countries (Kemp, 2017, as cited in Hai-Bing Zhan 2017).

However, President Trump's decision to withdraw did not necessarily mean that it affected U.S. emissions since there was no direct link, but instead meant that the U.S. was no longer regulated by the Paris Agreement once officially withdrawn. On the other hand, since the U.S. was not regulated this influenced a change to the carbon emission space. For example, "[u]nder the NDC target, the withdrawal of the U.S. led to it increasing its own emission space by 14%, 28%, and 54% in the 20, 13, and 00 scenarios, respectively." This meant that the U.S. would obtain more room to emit carbon while other countries would have to cut down on their emissions in order to be able to reach their goal of only 2 °C. Trump's withdrawal increased the carbon price for other countries while reducing its own carbon price.

When the withdrawal took effect, the U.S. was the only UNFCCC member states who was not a signatory to the Paris Agreement. At the time of the original withdrawal announcement, Syria and Nicaragua were also not participants; however, both Syria and Nicaragua later ratified the agreement which left the U.S. the only UNFCCC member state that wasn't intending to be a party to the Paris Agreement.

Luke Kemp of the Australian National University's Fenner School of Environment and Society wrote in a commentary for Nature that "withdrawal is unlikely to change US emissions" since "the greenhouse gas emissions of the US are divorced from international legal obligations." However, he added that it could hamper climate change mitigation efforts if the U.S. stopped contributing to the Green Climate Fund. Kemp said the effect of a U.S. withdrawal could be either good or bad for the Paris agreement, since "a rogue US can cause more damage inside rather than outside of the agreement." Finally, "A withdrawal could also make the US into a climate pariah and provide a unique opportunity for China and the EU to take control of the climate regime and significantly boost their international reputations and soft power." On the other hand there is belief that China is not capable of taking control of the climate regime and instead should, "help rebuild global shared leadership by replacing the Sino–U.S. G2 partnership with a Climate 5 (C5) partnership that comprises China, the EU, India, Brazil, and South Africa."

==== Potential economic impact ====
The German car industry expressed concerns about its ability to remain competitive in light of the United States decision to withdraw. The president of the German auto industry lobby group VDA, Matthias Wissmann said, "The regrettable announcement by the USA makes it inevitable that Europe must facilitate a cost efficient and economically feasible climate policy to remain internationally competitive."

Many of the larger auto and aviation companies had already invested billions into reducing emissions and were unlikely to change course. General Motors, the largest automobile manufacturer in the United States, immediately pointed out: "Our position on climate change has not changed ... we publicly advocate for climate action," and reiterated its support for various climate pledges. Analyst Rebecca Lindland also pointed out that manufacturers of automobiles were under no specific restrictions under the Accord and that nothing had changed. Even if Trump loosened other restrictions on the car industry that allowed for the production of less environmental cars, such cars still needed to conform to standards before they could be exported to other continents or even certain states. Jason Bordoff, energy-policy expert at Columbia University, agreed that withdrawing would make no difference to the economy, arguing that it would be determined by market conditions like the price of oil and gas. At the same time, airlines have been spending billions on seeking more fuel efficient ways to fly anyway –fuel is an airline's second-biggest expense after labor and so using less fuel (which means less emissions) is in their financial interest. Kabir Nanda and Varad Pande, senior consultant and partner at Dahlberg, respectively, argued that despite the U.S. withdrawal the American private sector was still committed to renewable energy and technology. Also noted was that solar energy had become cheaper than coal in an increasing number of countries.

=== Rationale for withdrawal ===
The Trump administration has justified its withdrawal from the Paris Agreement by stating concerns arose from structure of the Paris Agreement, economic concerns and political ideology. The Paris Agreement relies on international cooperation to ensure effectiveness in striving towards limiting the global temperature increase to 1.5 °C. Countries were obliged to report their progress on the stages of achieving their nationally determined contributions (NDCs); however, no consequences would result, particularly for those countries that fail to achieve their targets. Trump argued the framework of the Paris Agreement posed difficulties for the United States to prioritize clean energy development and related climate goals over their national development plans.

From the United States’ point of view, compliance with the Paris Agreement and its regulatory policies, such as carbon price and a shift to other energy substitutes, could hinder the development of the fossil fuel sectors in the United States, with a future projection of global fossil fuel usage to reduce one-third by 2040. In Trump’s speech, he commented on the Paris Agreement as “a financial and economic burden” imposed on the United States and cited meeting the Agreement commitments would reduce 38% iron and steel production and 86% production in the coal mining sectors respectively. He has once labelled the Agreement a “Chinese hoax” on social media, stating the Paris Agreement would benefit other countries’ economy at the expense of the United States. Therefore, he expressed that the withdrawal was a necessary move to align with the focus of “America First” in his administration, which aimed at protecting the United States’ sovereignty and preventing profit losses in these sectors.

=== Reactions ===
==== Petitions ====
Petitions were launched across states in order to persuade state governors to join the Paris Agreement or have Trump reverse the planned withdrawal, which included a "ParisMyState" and a MoveOn petition that has received over 535,000 signatures.

==== Scientists and environmentalists ====
Piers Forster, the director of the University of Leeds' Priestley International Centre for Climate, called the decision to withdraw "a sad day for evidence-based policy" and expressed hope that individual Americans, businesses and states would nevertheless choose to decarbonize. Climate scientist Dave Reay of the University of Edinburgh said that "The United States will come to rue this day." The University Corporation for Atmospheric Research (UCAR), in a statement by its president Antonio Busalacchi Jr., said that the decision to withdraw "does not mean that climate change will go away" and warned that "the heightened potential for increased greenhouse gas emissions poses a substantial threat to our communities, businesses, and military." The Information Technology and Innovation Foundation called the decision to withdraw "very discouraging" and said that it would diminish confidence in international climate change efforts; the technology think tank called for federal efforts on "the smart grid, energy storage, carbon capture and sequestration, and advanced nuclear and solar power" and warned that "Without a smart, aggressive clean-energy innovation strategy, the world will not avert the worst effects of climate change."

Canadian academic and environmental activist David Suzuki stated, "Trump just passed on the best deal the planet has ever seen". Navroz Dubash of the Centre for Policy Research in New Delhi expressed bafflement at Trump's move, citing the declining costs of renewable energy sources and the increasing difficulty of obtaining investment for fossil-fuel projects. Environmental scientist and risk assessor Dana Nuccitelli stated that it "now seems inevitable that the history books will view Trump as America's worst-ever president". Bob Ward of the Grantham Research Institute also described Trump's speech as "confused nonsense". Stephen Hawking criticized Trump, saying that he "will cause avoidable environmental damage to our beautiful planet, endangering the natural world, for us and our children."

Multiple environmental groups, such as the Sierra Club and Natural Resources Defense Council, condemned Trump's decision. American environmentalist and writer Bill McKibben, the founder of the climate change action group 350.org, called the move "a stupid and reckless decision—our nation's dumbest act since launching the war in Iraq." McKibben wrote that Trump's decision to withdraw amounted "to a thorough repudiation of two of the civilizing forces on our planet: diplomacy and science." He called upon U.S. states and cities to "double down" on commitments to renewable energy.

==== Domestic political response ====
===== Republicans =====
Republicans gave mixed reviews of Trump's decision to withdraw. Former vice president Mike Pence stated that Trump administration "demonstrated real leadership" by pulling the United States out of the international accords which he called "a transfer of wealth from the most powerful economy in the world to other countries around the planet". He also stated that he doesn't understand why Democrats and liberals in the United States and the left around the world care about climate change. Senate Majority Leader Mitch McConnell, Speaker of the House Paul Ryan, Counselor to the President Kellyanne Conway and Administrator of the Environmental Protection Agency Scott Pruitt praised the decision as a victory for America's middle class, workers, businesses and coal miners. Texas Attorney General Ken Paxton described Trump's decision as "courageous" and said that it lifted a burden from the American taxpayer. However, Republican Senator Susan Collins of Maine was critical of the decision, stating that she was disappointed. Former Governor of California Arnold Schwarzenegger issued a video address describing Trump's decision as a retrograde step.

===== Democrats =====
Former President Bill Clinton wrote: "Walking away from Paris treaty is a mistake. Climate change is real. We owe our children more. Protecting our future also creates more jobs." Former President Barack Obama said of Trump's decision: "Even as this Administration joins a small handful of nations that reject the future, I'm confident that our states, cities, and businesses will step up and do even more to lead the way, and help protect for future generations the one planet we've got." Former vice-president Joe Biden said he believes the move imperils American security. Former Democratic Senator Joe Manchin supported Trump's withdrawal, saying he supported "a cleaner energy future" but that the Paris deal failed to strike "a balance between our environment and the economy."

In his withdrawal speech, President Trump stated: "I was elected to represent the citizens of Pittsburgh, not Paris." The incumbent Mayor of Pittsburgh, Bill Peduto, immediately acknowledged on Twitter with a reminder that 80% of his city's voters favored Hillary Clinton during the 2016 presidential election, and wrote: "As the Mayor of Pittsburgh, I can assure you that we will follow the guidelines of the Paris Agreement for our people, our economy and future." Senate Democratic Leader Chuck Schumer condemned the withdrawal.

===== U.S. states =====
Responding the following week to the withdrawal, the governors of California, New York, and Washington founded the United States Climate Alliance, pledging to uphold the Paris Agreement within their borders. By the evening of June 1, 2017, Colorado, Connecticut, Hawaii, Oregon, Massachusetts, Rhode Island, Vermont and Virginia declared their intention to join with United States Climate Alliance members in reaching Paris Agreement goals. Governors of other states also expressed interest in upholding the Agreement. As of November 2020 the alliance included 24 states plus Puerto Rico and American Samoa.

==== International response ====
President Jean-Claude Juncker of the European Union's response on the withdrawal

- African Union – A joint statement with the European Union reaffirmed the commitment of the 55 African nations to the Paris Agreement.
- Argentina – President Mauricio Macri was "deeply disappointed" by the withdrawal, and ratified the Argentine support to the treaty.
- Australia – Prime Minister Malcolm Turnbull said that the decision was "disappointing" and that "we would prefer the United States to remain part of the agreement". The opposition Australian Labor Party expressed similar sentiments.
- Austria – President Alexander Van der Bellen said that U.S. president Donald Trump's decision to leave the Paris accord only challenges Europe to double its efforts in order to do everything possible to protect the planet and save it for future generations.
- Bahamas – The Ministry of Foreign Affairs has expressed concern regarding the announced withdrawal of the United States from the Paris Agreement on climate change.
- Belgium – Prime Minister Charles Michel called the decision "a brutal act".
- Bangladesh – The foreign ministry stated they are disappointed in Trump's decision.
- Brazil – The federal ministries for foreign affairs and for the environment issued a joint statement describing their "profound concern and disappointment".
- Bolivia – President Evo Morales called the U.S. one of the world's "main polluters" and at The United Nations Ocean Conference said Trump's decision is akin to "denying science, turning your backs on multilateralism and attempting to deny a future to upcoming generations", making the U.S. the main threat to mother Earth and life itself.
- Bulgaria – Minister Neno Dimov issued Bulgaria will honour the commitments under the Paris Agreement.
- Cambodia – A Cambodian official said U.S. president Donald Trump's decision to leave the Paris Climate Agreement is "unethical" and "irresponsible".
- Canada – Prime Minister Justin Trudeau said he was "deeply disappointed" and that "Canada is unwavering in our commitment to fight climate change and support clean economic growth". Canada will "continue to work with the U.S. at the state level" and will reach out to the U.S. federal government to "discuss this matter of critical importance for all humankind".
- Chile – The minister pointed out the deep disappointment about the withdrawal in a joint statement.
- China – Premier Li Keqiang reaffirmed his country's commitment to the Agreement.
- Colombia – President Juan Manuel Santos lamented the exit of the United States from the COP21 stating that "the survival of the world and humanity is at stake". Minister of Environment and Sustainable Development Luis Gilberto Murillo expressed that Colombia was "saddened" by Trump's decision to withdraw the United States from the Paris Climate Accord, stating that "Trump's decision increased Colombia's vulnerability to climate change and will make it more difficult to advance toward an international goal to avoid an increase in global temperatures".
- Cook Islands – Prime Minister Henry Puna said the U.S. has isolated itself in the Pacific region in its actions on climate change.
- Costa Rica – The Government said the withdraw could cause a setback on climate issues, because of President Trump's lack of understanding of U.S. responsibilities as one of the globe's leading sources of emissions.
- Croatia – The Ministry of Environmental Protection and Energy stated that achieving the Paris Agreement goals would become a bigger challenge.
- Czech Republic – The Prime Minister said "This wrong decision by President Trump will weaken the Paris Agreement, but it will not destroy it. It is a shame that the US is isolating itself in a matter so important to the whole planet."
- Denmark – Prime Minister Lars Løkke Rasmussen described it as "a sad day for the world".
- Dominica – The Minister for Foreign Affairs and CARICOM Affairs urged the United States of America to reconsider its decision to withdraw from the Paris Climate Accord, saying it is a major concern to small states.
- Estonia – Prime Minister Jüri Ratas reaffirmed his nation's commitment to the Agreement.
- Ethiopia – Diplomat Gebru Jember Endalew said it would be a "betrayal" for the U.S. to abandon the agreement.
- European Union – The European Commission has stated that it "deeply regrets" the decision.
- Fiji – President Frank Bainimarama described the "loss of America's leadership" as "unfortunate".
- Finland – Prime Minister Juha Sipilä urged Trump to show global leadership, stating that "we need the USA on the team". Minister of Environment Kimmo Tiilikainen stated that the USA had never been "so small" and that the world does not need the kind of leadership that Donald Trump represents.
- France – In a telephone conversation with Trump, President Emmanuel Macron described the agreement as non-negotiable. In a televised speech, Macron reiterated his invitation to American climate change and renewable energy scientists to relocate their work to France, concluding his assessment with the phrase: "Make our planet great again." Prior to the withdrawal, former President Nicolas Sarkozy called for a tariff on all U.S. exports to Europe if Trump went through with the promised withdrawal. National Front leader Marine Le Pen appreciated Trump's commitment to his campaign pledge, but described his decision as "extremely regrettable."
- Germany – Angela Merkel heavily criticized Trump's decision.
- Ghana – Former President John Dramani Mahama has lashed out at Donald Trump over his decision.
- Grenada – The minister pointed out the deep disappointment about the withdrawal in a joint statement.
- Hungary – Prime Minister Viktor Orbán stated that he was "in a state of shock" after hearing Trump's decision, and that it opposes the view of Hungary's right wing.
- Iceland – The government 'condemned' the move.
- Ireland – Minister for Communications, Climate Action and the Environment, Denis Naughten described the decision as "irresponsible" and that Ireland would continue its efforts to reach emissions targets and lead by example. Former President Mary Robinson called it "truly shocking".
- India – Prime Minister Narendra Modi reiterated India's support for the climate accord, and pledged to go 'above and beyond' its aims.
- Indonesia – Spokesman for the Ministry of Foreign Affairs, Armanatha Nasir, said that "America's decision is not in line with international commitments. Indonesia believes that climate change requires cooperation and contribution of all parties, both developed and developing countries."
- Iran – First Vice President Eshaq Jahangiri criticized Washington for pulling out of the Paris agreement, stressing that the U.S. is the main culprit behind producing greenhouse gases. "Trump has forgotten that the gases produced in the past few decades have endangered the life of not only the Americans but also all humankind," he added.
- Israel – Energy Minister Yuval Steinitz criticized Trump for rejecting "a rare occurrence in which the world united".
- Italy – Paolo Gentiloni expressed "regret" and sorrow for America's action.
- Jamaica – The Government and the Opposition expressed disappointment with the decision.
- Japan – In a statement, the Japanese Foreign Ministry said that Trump's choice was "regrettable" and that "Japan believes the leadership of the developed countries to be of great importance (on climate issues), and the steady implementation of the Paris Agreement is critical in this regard." The Minister of the Environment stated that he was "greatly disappointed, both as Minister and as an individual", and that withdrawal from the Paris Agreement was an act that "turned its back on the wisdom of the human race". The Deputy Prime Minister said "The U.S. created the League of Nations, but this country did not join the League. The U.S. is just that kind of country."
- Kazakhstan – The Minister of Foreign Affairs pledged to carry forward the Paris Agreement and Agenda 2030. The Astana Expo 2017's theme was "Future Energy".
- Kiribati – Anote Tong, the former president and one of the prominent Pacific voices during the Paris agreement negotiations, said Trump's decision to pull out of the Paris climate agreement is a selfish move that ignores the plight of low-lying island nations.
- Latvia – The Environmental Protection and Regional Development Ministry issued a statement confirming Latvia's commitment to the Paris Agreement and describing the negative impact Trump's decision may have on investment in clean energy among developing nations.
- Liechtenstein – The Minister of Foreign Affairs regrets Trump's decision and decided to ratify the Paris Agreement.
- Luxembourg – Wants to increase contributions to climate change body.
- Malaysia – The Ministry is confident that the Paris Agreement on Climate Change will not fail despite the United States having announced its withdrawal from the treaty.
- Maldives – Environment Minister Thoriq Ibrahim, speaking on behalf of the Alliance of Small Island States (AOSIS), defended the agreement as "designed for maximum flexibility and universal participation", adding that Trump's proposed renegotiation was "not practical" and that it could represent "a setback from which we would never recover".
- Marshall Islands – President Hilda Heine described the move as "highly concerning for those of us that live on the frontline of climate change".
- Micronesia – President Peter Christian emphasized that nations must work together to achieve the goals set out by the Paris agreement.
- Mexico – President Enrique Peña Nieto responded with a reiteration of Mexico's unconditional support for the Paris agreement.
- Monaco – Prince Albert calls President Trump's retreat from Paris Agreement a 'Historic Mistake'.
- Morocco – COP22's president and former Moroccan Minister of Foreign Affairs Salaheddine Mezouar has expressed his "deep disappointment" but noted that collective efforts to fight climate change will continue.
- Namibia – Environment and Tourism Minister Pohamba Shifeta says Namibia is saddened by the withdrawal of the United States from the Paris Climate Change Agreement, describing the move as a major blow to the efforts to tackle global warming.
- Nepal – Nepali Youth and Mountain Community Dwellers appealed to U.S. president Donald Trump to take back his decision.
- New Zealand – Prime Minister Bill English released a statement confirming that he will register his 'disappointment' with Rex Tillerson during an upcoming visit by the U.S. Secretary of State.
- Netherlands – Foreign minister Bert Koenders released the statement "It represents a cardinal mistake that is damaging to citizens around the world, including those of the United States."
- Nigeria – The Government has expressed disappointment over the decision of the United States.
- North Korea – The foreign ministry has condemned President Donald Trump for pulling out of the Paris climate agreement, describing the decision as "the height of egotism" and an example of the "moral vacuum" in the U.S. leadership.
- Norway – The government condemned Trump's decision.
- Papua New Guinea – Climate Change & Development Authority managing director, Ruel Yamuna, said "Climate change is real and already affecting the livelihood of communities in Papua New Guinea" and "The Paris Agreement is stronger than Donald Trump".
- Philippines – In a statement, the climate body said the Philippines is "deeply troubled" by the withdrawal of the U.S. from the agreement and urged Trump to reconsider his decision.
- Poland – Deputy Energy Minister Grzegorz Tobiszowski praised Trump's decision, while signing an agreement for a new coal power station in Jaworzno.
- Portugal – President Marcelo Rebelo de Sousa said that "climate change is a problem and denying, for political reasons, that that problem exists won't make it go away"; he also reiterated that Europe should remain a champion of the fight against climate change, "a just and real" cause. During a visit to an elementary school, Prime Minister António Costa commented "it is a shame that President Trump did not attend this school and does not know what these children already know... that we only have one planet and that our first duty is to preserve it for future generations".
- Romania – The Foreign Affairs Minister ratified the Paris Agreement the same day.
- Russia – In advance of Trump's expected withdrawal announcement, Kremlin spokesman Dmitry Peskov reiterated Russia's support for the Paris agreement. After the withdrawal, when questioned by media sources about his views of the decision Putin stated "don't worry, be happy". He noted that since the non-binding agreement is not set to take effect until 2021, he believes there is plenty of time to create a working solution to global warming.
- Singapore – The government reaffirmed the commitment to Paris climate agreement.
- Slovenia – The government regretted the withdrawal of the U.S. from the Paris Climate Agreement.
- South Africa – The South African government stated that it "expresses its profound regret over the decision of the United States of America to withdraw from the Paris Agreement."
- South Korea – The Foreign Ministry for South Korea described Trump's move as 'regrettable'.
- South Sudan – Lutana, South Sudan's climate change director said 'He should know that his pulling out won't stop people from continuing to work on it.'
- St. Lucia – The minister pointed out the deep disappointment about the withdrawal in a joint statement.
- Spain – Rajoy assures EU of Spain's commitment to fighting climate change after Trump pulls USA out of Paris deal.
- Sweden – Foreign Minister Margot Wallström described it as "a decision to leave humanity's last chance of securing our children's future on this planet".
- Switzerland – President Doris Leuthard said the decision was "regrettable".
- Taiwan – The Presidential Office efforts to continue the Paris agreement despite Trump's climate decision.
- Tanzania – The Vice President said Tanzania will continue supporting the agreement.
- Turkey – Mehmet Emin Birpınar, Turkey's chief climate negotiator, expressed hope that other countries will not follow Trump, and affirmed Turkey's commitment despite the agreement's "unfairness".
- Tuvalu – Prime Minister Enele Sopoaga said that the U.S. had "abandoned" them.
- Uganda – Nicholas Ssenyonjo said "the US is the biggest contributor to pollution globally. Pulling out of the Paris agreement means that they do not care about the effects of their pollution to third world countries like Uganda."
- United Arab Emirates – Marashi, the chairperson of the Emirates Environmental Group (EEG), said that Trump's decision is "unfortunate".
- United Nations – A spokesman for U.N. Secretary-General António Guterres described Trump's decision as "a major disappointment".
- United Kingdom – Prime Minister Theresa May expressed her disappointment during a telephone call with Trump, and reaffirmed the United Kingdom's commitment to the agreement. She said on live TV, "I have spoken to Donald Trump and told him that the UK believes in the Paris agreement"
  - Scotland Scotland's First Minister Nicola Sturgeon saw it as an "appalling abdication of leadership" that May's signature was lacking from a joint declaration by the leaders of Germany, France and Italy.
- Uruguay – The Minister for Housing, Land Planning & Environment pointed out the deep disappointment about the withdrawal in a joint statement.
- Vatican – Bishop Marcelo Sánchez Sorondo, Chancellor of the Pontifical Academy of Sciences, described the withdrawal as a "huge slap in the face" to the world.
- Zambia – The Zambian minister for Water Development, Sanitation and Environmental Protection, Lloyd Kaziya, described the withdrawal as "a serious tragedy" to developing countries.
- Zimbabwe – Zhakata said Zimbabwe remained committed to the treaty, but the U.S. withdrawal will make it more difficult for the country.

==== Business and industry ====
The American Coalition for Clean Coal Electricity and Peabody Energy, the largest listed coal producer in the United States, applauded the decision, claiming the result will be lower energy prices and greater reliability of supply.

On the day of Trump's predicted withdrawal, 25 companies placed a full-page open letter to President Trump in The New York Times and The Wall Street Journal, encouraging the administration to keep the U.S. in the Paris Agreement. The companies were:

- Adobe
- Apple
- Blue Cross Blue Shield
- Danfoss
- Dignity Health
- Facebook
- Gap
- Google
- The Hartford
- Hewlett Packard Enterprise
- Ingersoll Rand
- Intel
- Johnson Controls
- Levi Strauss & Co.
- Mars
- Microsoft
- Morgan Stanley
- National Grid
- PG&E
- Royal DSM
- Salesforce.com
- Schneider Electric
- Tiffany & Co.
- Unilever
- VF

Following Trump's announcement, ExxonMobil, Chevron, Shell and General Motors reaffirmed their support for the Paris Agreement and for measures to tackle climate change.

Michael Bloomberg pledged $15 million to the UN Framework Convention on Climate Change Executive Secretariat, explaining: "Americans will honor and fulfill the Paris Agreement by leading from the bottom up—and there isn't anything Washington can do to stop us". Shortly following Trump's announcement, thirty city mayors, three state governors, more than eighty university presidents and the leaders of more than a hundred businesses joined Bloomberg in opening negotiations with the United Nations to submit a plan for limiting American climate-change emissions in accord with the Paris Agreement guidelines.

Goldman Sachs CEO Lloyd Blankfein described Trump's decision as "a setback for the environment and for the U.S.'s leadership position in the world". General Electric CEO Jeff Immelt stated that "climate change is real".

Multiple tech company executives—including Google CEO Sundar Pichai, Microsoft President and Chief Legal Officer Brad Smith, Apple CEO Tim Cook, Facebook CEO Mark Zuckerberg, and General Electric CEO Jeff Immelt—condemned the decision. Microsoft's Satya Nadella said Microsoft believes that "climate change is an urgent issue that demands global action." Google's Sundar Pichai tweeted "Disappointed with today's decision. Google will keep working hard for a cleaner, more prosperous future for all". Facebook's Mark Zuckerberg said "Withdrawing from the Paris climate agreement is bad for the environment, bad for the economy, and it puts our children's future at risk."

===== Resignations from presidential advisory boards in protest =====
Two business leaders resigned from Trump advisory boards in protest to his decision to withdraw. Elon Musk, CEO of Tesla, Inc. and SpaceX, resigned from the two presidential advisory councils on which he had sat. Musk stated: "Climate change is real. Leaving Paris is not good for America or the world." Robert Iger, CEO of The Walt Disney Company, also resigned, saying "As a matter of principle, I've resigned from the President's Council over the Paris Agreement withdrawal."

==== U.S. public opinion ====
The Paris Agreement is broadly popular among Americans. A national poll by the Chicago Council on Global Affairs conducted in June 2016 found that 71 percent of American adults favored U.S. participation in the Paris Agreement. Similar, a November 2016 poll conducted by the Yale Program on Climate Change Communication found that 69 percent of U.S. registered voters favored U.S. participation in the Paris Agreement, while just 13 percent were opposed. Trump's decision to withdraw the U.S. from the accord was seen as an attempt to appeal to his base, even at the risk of alienating Democrats and independent voters. This strategy diverged from the typical approach taken by most U.S. presidents, who historically have sought to appeal to the center. A New York Times analysis described the move as "a daring and risky strategy" taken by "the first president in the history of polling to govern without the support of a majority of the public from the start of his tenure," adding: "In effect, Mr. Trump is doubling down on presiding as a minority president, betting that when the time comes, his fervent supporters will matter more, especially clustered in key Midwest states."

A Washington Post/ABC News public opinion survey of American adults, conducted from June 2–4, 2017, found that 59 percent opposed Trump's decision to withdraw the U.S. from the Paris Agreement, and just 28 percent supported it. Asked about the effect of withdrawal on the U.S. economy, 42 percent said it would hurt the economy; 32 percent believed it would help the economy; and 20 percent believed that it would make no difference. The poll showed a sharp division among partisan lines: 67 percent of Republicans supported Trump's decision, but just 22 percent of independents and 8 percent of Democrats supported it.

==== Media ====
===== Domestic =====
USA Today, in an editorial, stated that "There was no greatness in the decision he rendered Thursday, just the heightened prospect of a climate-stricken globe left behind for future generations." The New York Times called it "disgraceful" and stated that Trump "knows nothing or cares little about the science underlying the stark warnings of environmental disruption."

For their edition of June 2, 2017, the New York Daily News revived their famous 1975 "Ford to City: Drop Dead" cover with a photo of Trump and the words "Trump to World: Drop Dead".

The Tampa Bay Times criticized the move, writing that it would especially endanger coastal states such as Florida, which are already suffering from rising sea levels, which damage property and infrastructure and harm the drinking water supply. The Detroit Free Press stated that "President Donald Trump has betrayed the future of our children, our grandchildren, and our planet".

Bloomberg stated that "Under Trump, the U.S. has already become an irresponsible role model." The San Diego Union-Tribune stated that "President Trump is ushering in the Chinese Century" and called it the worst decision of Trump's life.

A piece by commentator Erick Erickson published by Fox News described the withdrawal from the Paris Agreement as the correct move, for the reason that "climate change is [not] an issue worth caring much about". Douglas E. Schoen, also writing for Fox, contrarily said that a withdrawal from the Paris Agreement "only hastens America's retreat from global political and economic leadership".

===== Foreign =====
Foreign coverage of Trump's announcement was overwhelmingly unfavorable. A lead in the British newspaper The Guardian said that the decision would be unlikely to stunt the growth of renewable energy, and suggested that "a much more likely casualty of Trump's choice is the US economy he claims to be protecting". The British newspaper The Independent noted the "tension between myth and reality" in Trump's withdrawal speech. The German tabloid Berliner Kurier ran a headline "Erde an Trump: Fuck You!" ("Earth to Trump: Fuck You!").

China's Xinhua state news agency called the withdrawal a "global setback."

The Toronto Star said that

In the long catalogue of destructive things that Donald Trump has inflicted on the United States and the world, pulling out of the most important global attempt to slow the impact of climate change must go down as the worst.

=== Protests ===
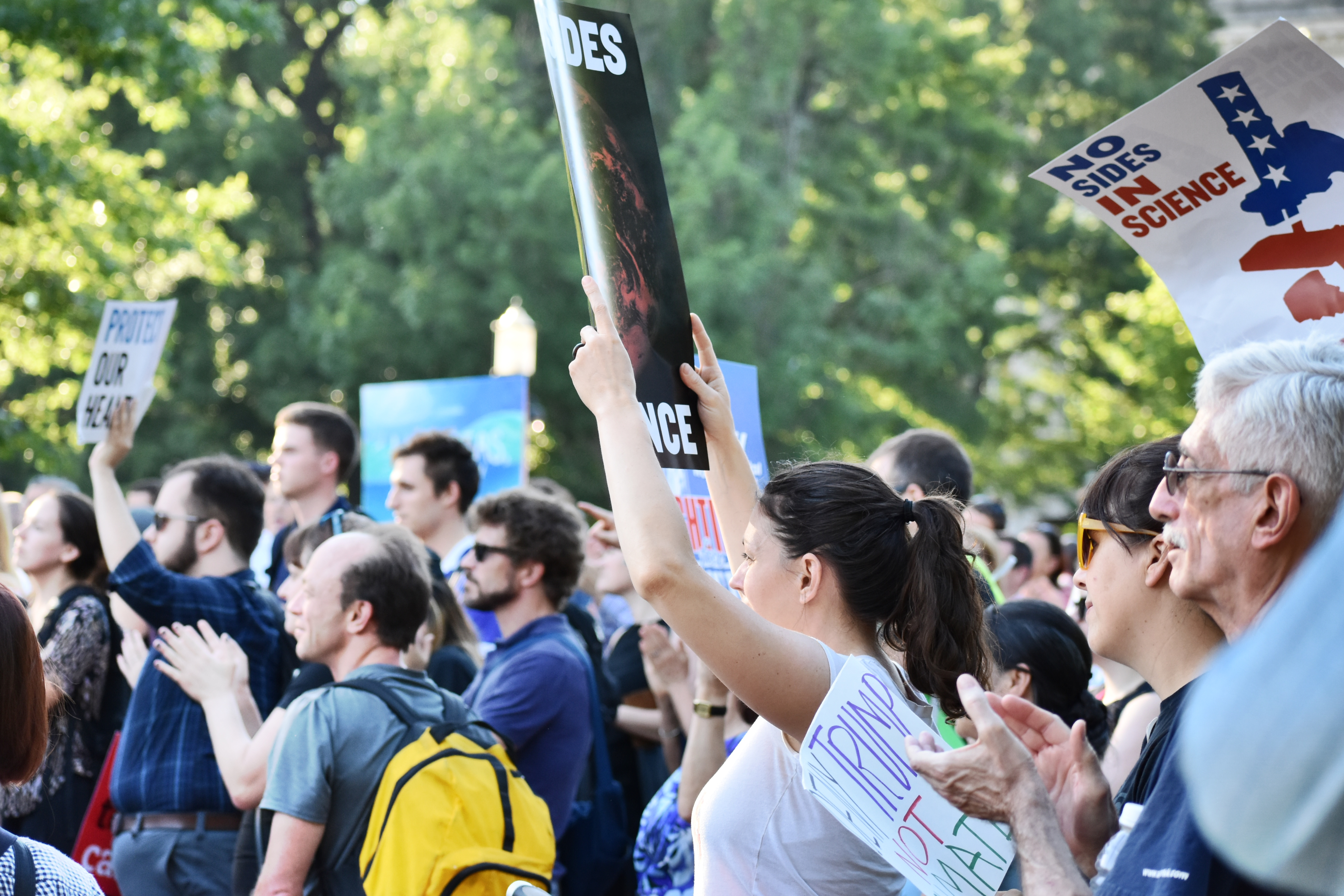
Protesters in Washington, D.C., the day of the announcement

Protesters gathered at the White House gates on the day of the announcement. Bill Nye, a science communicator and television personality known for making scientific concepts more accessible to the general public, was one of the protesters in attendance. The John A. Wilson Building in D.C. was lit in green in protest of the decision, as were One World Trade Center and the Kosciuszko Bridge in New York City; the city halls of New York, Boston and Montreal; the Hôtel de Ville in Paris; and the Monumento a la Revolución and the Angel of Independence in Mexico City. Protests also occurred in New York City, Miami, San Diego, and Syracuse.

== Rejoining ==
Joe Biden became the president-elect following the November 2020 election, defeating Trump. As part of his transition plan, Biden announced that one of his first actions on his first day in office would be to return the United States to the Paris Agreement via an executive order. He also stated plans to further the United States' commitment towards mitigating climate change in line with the Paris Agreement.

Under terms of the Agreement, the United States would only need to wait a month after submitting their intent to rejoin before formally rejoining, though they would lose some of the privileges from the short time the country was out of the Agreement; they would not have been able to participate in any key meetings while they were not a member, for example.

President Biden signed an executive order to rejoin the Paris Agreement on January 20, 2021, his first day in office; the U.S. rejoined on February 19, 2021.

== Second withdrawal ==
On January 20, 2025, shortly after his second inauguration, President Trump signed an executive order titled "Putting America First In International Environmental Agreements", to withdraw the United States from the agreement for a second time. This order would take the US officially out of the Paris Agreement in January 2026, one year after the formal notification was submitted to the United Nations Secretary-General. The withdrawal went into effect on January 27, 2026.

In February 2026, the United States notified the United Nations of its withdrawal from the United Nations Framework Convention on Climate Change, effective a year later, the first country to do so.

== See also ==
- Canada and the Kyoto Protocol
- Environmental policy of the first Trump administration
- Neo-nationalism
- Politics of global warming
- United States Climate Alliance
- Proposals for the United States to withdraw from the United Nations
- United States withdrawal from the Joint Comprehensive Plan of Action
- Trumpism
- Right-wing antiglobalism
- Right-wing antiscience
- United States and the United Nations
