= United States Climate Alliance =

Organization in the US

- United States Climate Alliance *Former members *Virginia rejoined as of April 2026
- Type: Subnational coalition (not legally binding)
- Membership: 23 out of 50 states: Arizona; California (founder); Colorado; Connecticut; Delaware; Hawaii; Illinois; Maine; Maryland; Massachusetts; Michigan; Minnesota; New Jersey; New Mexico; New York (founder); North Carolina; Oregon; Pennsylvania; Rhode Island; Vermont; Virginia; Washington (founder); Wisconsin; 2 out of 5 territories: Puerto Rico; Guam

Leaders
  - Co-chair: (New York (state)) Kathy Hochul
  - Co-chair: (New Mexico) Michelle Lujan Grisham
- Establishment: June 1, 2017

Population
  - 2022 estimate: 179,618,352 (Note: Attributed to multiple sources:) (8th)
- GDP (PPP): 2023 estimate
  - Total: $11.516 trillion (Note: Attributed to multiple sources:) (4th)
  - Per capita: $64,115 (10th)
- Website; USClimateAlliance.org

The United States Climate Alliance is a bipartisan coalition of states and unincorporated self-governing territories in the United States that are committed to upholding the objectives of the 2015 Paris Agreement on climate change within their borders, by achieving the U.S. goal of reducing greenhouse gas (carbon dioxide equivalent) economy-wide emissions 26–28% from 2005 levels by 2025 and meeting or exceeding the targets of the federal Clean Power Plan.

The Alliance was formed on June 1, 2017, following the announcement earlier that day by President Donald Trump that he had decided to withdraw the United States from the Paris Agreement. The Alliance also serves as a forum for its members to further develop and strengthen their existing Climate Action Plans through the sharing of information and best practices.

As of August 19, 2024, the 24 members of the Alliance at the time made up 55% of the U.S. population and over 60% of U.S. GDP. (Note: Attributed to multiple sources:) Vermont is currently the only state with a Republican governor to be part of the Alliance, although Massachusetts and Maryland joined while under the governorship of Republicans Charlie Baker and Larry Hogan, respectively. Conversely, Kansas and Kentucky are currently the only states with Democratic governors that are not part of the Alliance. After excluding Puerto Rico and Guam figures from the emission total (required due to their status as territories rather than states), the 2023 members' combined share of U.S. carbon dioxide emissions was 42% in 2020.

The re-election of Donald Trump and the subsequent second withdrawal from the Paris Agreement in 2025 brought the Alliance back in the spotlight.

== History ==
Before the Alliance's founding, 12 states, led by Democratic governors, signed a petition urging the president of the United States to remain in the Paris Agreement on May 3. A similar petition was signed by 2 states led by Republican governors on May 17.

The Alliance was formed on June 1, 2017, following President Donald Trump's earlier that day announcement that he had decided to withdraw the United States from the Paris Agreement. The formation of the Alliance was announced by three state governors: Jay Inslee of Washington, Andrew Cuomo of New York, and Jerry Brown of California. The Alliance is not a legally binding treaty, but a grouping of state governments with similar policies regarding climate change.

The founding press statement was released in three versions on June 1, which all stated that: "New York, California and Washington, representing over one-fifth of U.S. Gross Domestic Product, are committed to achieving the U.S. goal of reducing emissions 26–28 percent from 2005 levels and meeting or exceeding the targets of the federal Clean Power Plan." The governors of the three founding states are members of the Democratic Party, although the Alliance itself is founded as a bipartisan coalition also open for membership of states governed by members of the Republican Party.

By the evening of June 1, the state governors of seven other U.S. states (Connecticut, Hawaii, Oregon, Massachusetts, Rhode Island, Vermont, and Virginia) announced their intention to maintain their states' support for the Paris Agreement, though not necessarily as part of the Alliance. All seven states that expressed support for the Paris agreement on June 1 opted to join the Alliance within the next 4 days. Nearly 70% of Americans, including majorities in all 50 states, support the Paris Agreement on climate change.

On June 2, Governor Dan Malloy announced that Connecticut would join the Alliance. On the same day, Massachusetts Governor Charlie Baker became the first Republican governor to bring his state into the Alliance. Governor Phil Scott of Vermont, another Republican, said his state would join. Governor Gina Raimondo said Rhode Island would also join. Governor Kate Brown said Oregon would join. Governor David Ige of Hawaii announced that Hawaii would also join, making it the 9th state in the Alliance.

On June 5, Democratic Virginia Governor Terry McAuliffe announced that Virginia would join the Alliance. Governor Mark Dayton of Minnesota, Governor John Carney of Delaware, and Governor Ricardo Rosselló of Puerto Rico joined the Alliance on June 5. On July 11, Colorado Governor John Hickenlooper announced that Colorado would join the Alliance, bringing the total number of members to 14 (thirteen states and Puerto Rico.)

On July 13, the Alliance's official website was launched. As of the launch of the website, the members of the Alliance comprised 13 out of the 14 states having signed a petition urging the president of the United States to stay in the Paris Agreement in May 2017 (only Pennsylvania had opted not to join).

On September 20, North Carolina governor Roy Cooper announced that his state would join the Alliance, bringing the total number of state members to 14. On January 10, 2018, Maryland governor Larry Hogan made his state the third Republican-led state to join the Alliance, bringing the total number of state members to 15. On February 21, 2018, newly elected New Jersey governor Phil Murphy announced that his state was joining the Alliance, bringing the total number of state members to 16.

In January 2019, Governors J. B. Pritzker of Illinois and Michelle Lujan Grisham of New Mexico announced that their states would join the Alliance, bringing the total number of state members to 18.

In February 2019, Governors Gretchen Whitmer of Michigan, Tony Evers of Wisconsin and Janet Mills of Maine announced that their states would join the Alliance, bringing the total number of state members to 21.

In March 2019, Governor Steve Sisolak of Nevada announced that his state would join the Alliance, bringing the total number of state members to 22. In April 2019, Governor Tom Wolf of Pennsylvania announced that his state would join the Alliance as well, bringing the total number of state members to 23. In July 2019, Governor Steve Bullock of Montana announced that his state would join the Alliance, bringing the total number of state members to 24.

In the years since 2019, the elections of Greg Gianforte to Governor of Montana in 2020 and Glenn Youngkin to Governor of Virginia in January 2022, led to their states leaving the Alliance; meanwhile, John Bel Edwards, who served as Governor of Louisiana since 2016, joined on May 7, 2021, as did Governor of Guam Lou Leon Guerrero on February 20, 2023. The election of Republican governor Joe Lombardo led to Nevada leaving the climate alliance on July 12, 2023. Arizona joined the Alliance on July 17, 2023. The election of Jeff Landry as Governor of Louisiana led to Louisiana leaving the Alliance in January 2024. The Alliance today counts 24 jurisdictions, of which Vermont is the only one represented by a Republican governor.

Following the second inauguration of Donald Trump, he signed an executive order to withdraw the United States from the Paris Agreement for a second time. Co-chairs of the Climate Alliance Kathy Hochul and Michelle Lujan Grisham announced that they would lead a delegation to the United Nations Climate Change Conference later in the year.

On April 23, 2026 newly elected Virginia Governor Abigail Spanberger announced the state rejoined the Alliance after its earlier withdraw back in 2021. The Alliance now represents roughly 60% of the total U.S. economy, 23 states, and 55% of the nation's population.

== Membership ==
As of April 2026, 23 of 50 states and 2 of 5 territories are members. The federal District of Columbia is governed by a Democratic mayor, and due to their status being more similar to a city rather than a state, they opted to become a member of the Mayors National Climate Action Agenda instead of seeking membership of the U.S. Climate Alliance.

The Climate Alliance is maintained by a Secretariat of staff members who carry out the duties of the Alliance. The Secretariat is headquartered at the offices of the United Nations Foundation in Washington, D.C.

The Alliance is a non-binding organization, in which membership is indicated and supported by state executive orders enacted by participating governors rather than an interstate compact or trigger law passed by state legislatures.

State/territory	Governor		Joined	CO_{2} emissions from fuel use and energy production in 1990, 2005 and 2014 (million metric tons)			CO_{2} emissions per capita in 2015 (metric tons)
California	Gavin Newsom	D	June 1, 2017	363.8	389.4	358.0	9.3
New York	Kathy Hochul	D	June 1, 2017	208.9	211.6	169.7	8.5
Washington	Bob Ferguson	D	June 1, 2017	70.9	78.5	73.4	10.6
Connecticut	Ned Lamont	D	June 2, 2017	40.9	44.1	35.1	10.2
Rhode Island	Dan McKee	D	June 2, 2017	8.9	11.2	10.6	10.1
Massachusetts	Maura Healey	D	June 2, 2017	83.7	84.5	63.8	9.7
Vermont	Phil Scott	R	June 2, 2017	5.5	6.8	5.9	9.4
Oregon	Tina Kotek	D	June 2, 2017	30.8	41.1	38.0	9.6
Hawaii	Josh Green	D	June 2, 2017	21.7	23.0	18.4	13.0
Minnesota	Tim Walz	DFL	June 5, 2017	78.9	101.9	94.9	16.0
Delaware	John Carney	D	June 5, 2017	17.6	17.4	13.3	14.2
Puerto Rico	Pedro Pierluisi	PNP	June 5, 2017	20.5	37.4	28.3	7.9
Colorado	Jared Polis	D	July 11, 2017	65.2	95.4	91.6	16.6
North Carolina	Josh Stein	D	September 20, 2017	111.4	154.0	126.8	12.0
Maryland	Wes Moore	D	January 10, 2018	70.3	83.5	61.5	9.9
New Jersey	Phil Murphy	D	February 21, 2018	110	131	114	12.5
Illinois	J. B. Pritzker	D	January 23, 2019	193	246	235	17.1
New Mexico	Michelle Lujan Grisham	D	January 29, 2019				
Michigan	Gretchen Whitmer	D	February 4, 2019				
Wisconsin	Tony Evers	D	February 12, 2019				
Maine	Janet Mills	D	February 28, 2019				
Pennsylvania	Josh Shapiro	D	April 29, 2019				
Guam	Lou Leon Guerrero	D	February 20, 2023				
Arizona	Katie Hobbs	D	July 11, 2023				
Virginia	Abigail Spanberger	D	April 23, 2026				

=== Previous members ===
The following three states left the Climate Alliance after a few years of membership.

State/territory	Governor		Joined	Left	CO_{2} emissions from fuel use and energy production in 1990, 2005 and 2014 (million metric tons)	CO_{2} emissions per capita in 2015 (metric tons)
Nevada	Joe Lombardo	R	March 12, 2019	July 12, 2023		
Montana	Greg Gianforte	R	July 1, 2019	July 9, 2021		
Louisiana	Jeff Landry	R	May 7, 2021	January 8, 2024		

On October 11, 2017, the Democratic governor of the territory of American Samoa, Peleti Mauga, issued an executive order that were reported to have introduced the territory as a new member of the U.S. Climate Alliance. This claimed membership was however never confirmed by the official member list, (Note: Attributed to multiple sources:) and neither confirmed by any of the annual climate action reports subsequently published by the Climate Alliance. (Note: Attributed to multiple sources:)

== See also ==
- Under2 MOU
- Mayors National Climate Action Agenda
- Climate change in the United States
