= Under2 Coalition =

- Type: Subnational Coalition (operates via MOUs)
- Membership: 260 subnational jurisdictions worldwide

Establishment
  - Signed by founding jurisdictions in Sacramento, California: May 19, 2015

Population
  - 2021 estimate: 1.75 billion
- GDP (nominal): 2017 estimate
  - Total: $34 trillion
- Website under2coalition.org

The Under2 Coalition is a coalition of subnational governments that aims to achieve greenhouse gases emissions mitigation. It started as a memorandum of understanding, which was signed by twelve founding jurisdictions on May 19, 2015 in Sacramento, California. Although it was originally called the Under2 MOU, it became known as the Under2 Coalition in 2017. As of June 2024, the coalition represents 178 individual states, regions, provinces and subnational governments along with several other national and subnational entities. The list of signatories has grown to 270 governments, representing over 1.75 billion people and 50% of the world economy. The Under2 MOU was conceived through a partnership between the governments of California and Baden-Wurttemberg, with Climate Group acting as secretariat.

== Purpose and intent ==
The intent of the memorandum signatories is for each to achieve Greenhouse gas "emission reductions consistent with a trajectory of 80 to 95 percent below 1990 levels by 2050 and/or achieving a per capita annual emission goal of less than 2 metric tons by 2050. The signatories believe these actions are consistent with findings of the Intergovernmental Panel on Climate Change (IPCC) of what is necessary to avoid a 2 degree Celsius rise in average global temperatures. Organizers are concerned that a rise in global temperature above 2 degrees Celsius would cause widespread environmental harm.

Signatories to the memorandum are asked to submit a plan to meet the target reduction of green house gas emissions by 2 metric tons per capita by 2050. Each of the governments also pledges to assist each other with scientific research, sharing of the available technologies and best practices in energy efficiency.

The memorandum was developed just before the 2015 United Nations Climate Change Conference also known as COP 21 or Paris Agreement. The Under2 MOU allows subnational governments such as cities, counties and states to highlight their work to reduce greenhouse gas emissions.

== History ==
Subnational governments like cities, states and provinces have traditionally relied on national governments to take the lead on transnational climate governance aimed at addressing climate change mitigation through inter-governmental agreements. Some subnational governments have expressed frustration at the inaction of national leaders and took it upon themselves to create the subnational Under2 MOU agreement.^{[1]} The major difference between an international treaty and the Under2 MOU agreement between subnational governments is that the Under2 MOU is non-binding.^{[2]}

In December 2015, California and Baden-Wurttemberg, who spearheaded the Under 2 MOU, announced that Climate Group would take on the role of secretariat for the pact.

There have been efforts in the past to organize subnational governments to address climate change most notably through the Cities for Climate Protection Program - an effort associated with the International Union of Local Authorities and the United Nations Environment Programme. At its peak in 2010 the program had 700 municipal members who were required to provide among other things inventories and targets for greenhouse emissions. the International Union of Local Authorities provided technical assistance to the municipalities engaged in this planning.

Before the Under2 MOU was conceived many subnational governments had taken the initiative to create a climate action plan. The purpose of a climate action plan is to identify the amount of greenhouse gas emissions produced by the jurisdiction and, in many cases, provide strategies to lower or stop greenhouse gas emissions altogether. Some governments have found that the data produced by the climate action plan increases transparency and helps with longterm planning to reduce greenhouse gas emissions. Since signatories to the Under2 MOU submit their action plans as an appendix to the document this is the first time some cities and states around the world are coming up with plans to reduce greenhouse gas emissions in their jurisdiction.

== Participants ==
Continent/Region	State/Province Signatories
NORTHERN AMERICA	CANADA
	British Columbia (founding signatory)
	Northwest Territories
	Ontario (founding signatory)
	Quebec
	Vancouver (city)
	UNITED STATES
	Austin (city)
	Boulder (city)
	Broward County
	California (founding signatory)
	Connecticut
	Hawaii
	Los Angeles (city)
	Massachusetts
	Minnesota
	Montgomery County, Maryland
	New Hampshire
	New York City
	New York State
	Oakland (city)
	Oregon (founding signatory)
	Orlando (city)
	Pittsburgh (city)
	Portland (city)
	Rhode Island
	Sacramento (city)
	San Francisco (city)
	Seattle (city)
	Vermont (founding signatory)
	Virginia
	Washington state (founding signatory)
LATIN AMERICA	ARGENTINA
	Santa Fe (Co-Chair for Latin America and the Caribbean 2018-2020)
	Tucumán
	Jujuy
	BRASIL
	Acre (founding signatory)
	Amapá
	Amazonas
	Mato Grosso
	Pernambuco
	Rondônia
	São Paulo (city)
	São Paulo (state)
	Tocantins
	CHILE
	Santiago (city)
	COLOMBIA
	Caquetá
	Antioquia
	Guaviare
	Nariño
	Cundinamarca
	ECUADOR
	Azuay
	Pastaza
	MEXICO
	Aguascalientes
	Baja California (founding signatory)
	Baja California Sur
	Campeche
	Chiapas
	Colima
	Guanajuato
	Hidalgo
	Jalisco (founding signatory)
	Mexico City
	Nuevo León
	Oaxaca
	Mexico State
	Michoacán
	Querétaro
	Quintana Roo
	Sonora
	Tobasco
	Yucatán
	PERU
	Amazonas
	Huánuco
	Loreto
	Madre de Dios
	Piura
	San Martín
	Ucayali
EUROPE	AUSTRIA
	Lower Austria
	Upper Austria
	BELGIUM
	Wallonia
	FRANCE
	Alsace
	Auvergne-Rhône-Alpes
	Bas-Rhin
	Brittany
	Midi-Pyrénées
	Nouvelle-Aquitaine
	Occitanie
	Pays de la Loire
	La Réunion
	GERMANY
	Baden-Württemberg (founding signatory)
	Bavaria
	Hesse
	Lower Saxony
	North Rhine-Westphalia
	Rhineland-Palatinate
	Schleswig-Holstein
	Thuringia
	GREECE
	Attica
	HUNGARY
	Budapest (city)
	ITALY
	Abruzzo
	Basilicata
	Emilia-Romagna
	Lombardy
	Piedmont
	Sardinia
	Veneto
	THE NETHERLANDS
	Drenthe
	North Brabant
	North Holland
	South Holland
	NORWAY
	Akershus County Municipality
	PORTUGAL
	Azores
	Madeira
	SPAIN
	Andalusia
	Basque Country
	Catalonia (founding signatory)
	Comunidad de Madrid
	Galacia
	Navarra
	SWEDEN
	Jämtland Härjedalen
	Västra Götaland
	SWITZERLAND
	Basel-Landschaft
	Basel-Stadt
	UNITED KINGDOM
	Bristol (city)
	Manchester (city)
	Scotland
	Wales (founding signatory)
AFRICA	THE GAMBIA
	North Bank Region
	KENYA
	Laikipia County
	IVORY COAST
	Assemblée des Régions de Côte d'Ivoire
	NIGERIA
	Cross River State
	MOROCCO
	Mellal-Khénifra
	Casablanca-Settat
	Dakhla-Oued Ed-Dahab
	Drâa-Tafilalet
	Fès-Meknès
	Guelmim-Oued Noun
	Laâyoune-Sakia El Hamra
	Marrakesh-Safi
	Oriental
	Rabat-Salé-Kénitra
	Souss-Massa
	Tanger-Tetouan-Al Hoceima
	MOZAMBIQUE
	Nampula (city)
	Quelimane (city)
	SENEGAL
	Guédiawaye (city)
	SOUTH AFRICA
	Gauteng
	KwaZulu-Natal
	Western Cape
ASIA	ARMENIA
	Ararat
	Kotayk
	Shirak
	CHINA
	Alliance of Peaking Pioneer Cities
	Jiangsu
	Sichuan
	INDIA
	Chhattisgarh
	Jammu and Kashmir (union territory)
	Maharashtra
	Meghalaya
	Telangana
	Tripura
	West Bengal
	Punjab
	INDONESIA
	East Kalimantan
	North Kalimantan
	Papua
	South Sumatra
	West Kalimantan
	JAPAN
	Gifu Prefecture
	NEPAL
	Kathmandu Valley
	SOUTH KOREA
	Chungnam
	Jeju
OCEANIA	AUSTRALIA
	Australian Capital Territory
	Queensland
	South Australia
	Victoria

== National Endorsements ==
Armenia, Canada, Chile, Costa Rica, Czech Republic, Denmark, Fiji, France, Germany, Italy, Japan, Luxembourg, Marshall Islands, Mexico, The Netherlands, Norway, Panama, Peru, Portugal, Spain, Sweden, United Kingdom

== See also ==
- United States Climate Alliance
- Mayors National Climate Action Agenda
- Climate Group
- Powering Past Coal Alliance
- C40 Cities Climate Leadership Group
