= Fourth National Climate Assessment =

Fourth National Climate Assessment (NCA4) 2017/2018 is a 1,500 page two-part congressionally mandated report by the U.S. Global Change Research Program (USGCRP)—the first of its kind by the Trump administration, who released the report on November 23, 2018. The climate assessment process, with a report to be submitted to Congress every four years, is mandated by law through the Global Change Research Act of 1990. The report, which took two years to complete, is the fourth in a series of National Climate Assessments (NCA) which included NCA1 (2000), NCA2 (2009), and NCA3 (2014).

Volume 1 of NCA4, "Climate Science Special Report" (CSSR) was released in October 2017. In the CSSR, researchers reported that "it is extremely likely that human activities, especially emissions of greenhouse gases, are the dominant cause of the observed warming since the mid-20th century. For the warming over the last century, there is no convincing alternative explanation supported by the extent of the observational evidence."

Volume 2, entitled "Impacts, Risks, and Adaptation in the United States", was released on November 23, 2018. According to NOAA, "human health and safety" and American "quality of life" is "increasingly vulnerable to the impacts of climate change". Like the previous reports in this series, the NCA4 is a "stand-alone report of the state of science relating to climate change and its physical impacts".

The authors say that without more significant mitigation efforts, there will be "substantial damages on the U.S. economy, human health, and the environment. Under scenarios with high emissions and limited or no adaptation, annual losses in some sectors are estimated to grow to hundreds of billions of dollars by the end of the century."

While the CSSR is "designed to be an authoritative assessment of the science of climate change" in the United States, it does not include policy recommendations.

Fifth National Climate Assessment (NCA5) was published in November 2023.

== Background ==
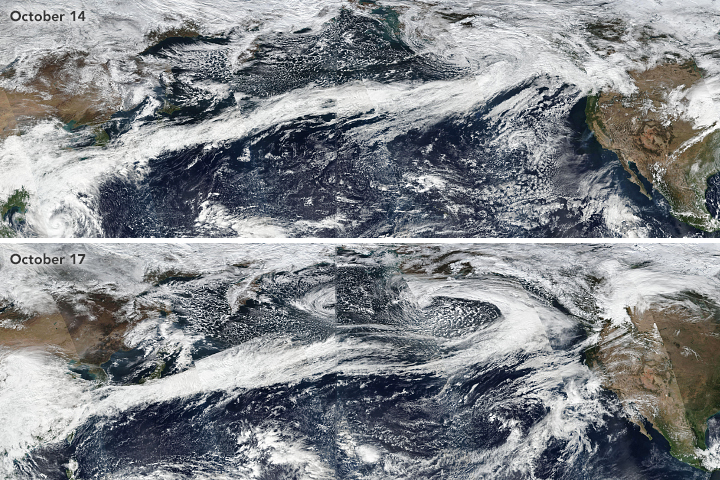
NASA Image of the Day October 26, 2017 Large atmospheric river, a river of rain, connecting Asia to North America. A February 2017 AR that ended California's 5-year drought, is featured on the CSSR NCA4 report's front cover.

President George H.W. Bush signed the Global Change Research Act of 1990 104 Stat. 3096 into law on November 16, 1990, which established the United States Global Change Research Program with a mandate to understand and respond to global change, including the cumulative effects of human activities and natural processes on the environment, to promote discussions toward international protocols in global change research, and for other purposes."

Although the National Climate Assessment was mandated to release a report every four years, there have only been four reports since Global Change Research Act of 1990 was enacted.

== NCA4 Authors ==
In the preparation of the NCA4, the National Oceanic and Atmospheric Administration (NOAA), one of thirteen federal agencies comprising the USGCRP team, was the "administrative lead agency." The other agencies included the DOA, DOC, DOD, DOE, HHS, DOI, DOS, DOT, EPA, NASA, NSF, Smithsonian Institution, and the USAID. The report was produced with the assistance of "1,000 people, including 300 leading scientists, roughly half from outside the government." The Federal Science Steering Committee (SSC) for the CSSR included representatives from NOAA, NASA, and DOE, USGCRP and 3 Coordinating Lead Authors. (Note: All Federal Science Steering Committee (SSC) members were Federal employees during the development of this report.)

== Process ==
The Obama administration released a review draft of the CCSR with a public review period running from December 15, 2016 through February 3, 2017.

== Public policy ==
The full text of NCA4, Vol. 1.

While the CSSR is "designed to be an authoritative assessment of the science of climate change" in the United States, it does not include policy recommendations. On August 20, 2017, the Trump administration notified the 15-person Federal Advisory Committee for the Sustained National Climate Assessment (Note: The 15-person Federal Advisory Committee for the Sustained National Climate Assessment included "academics as well as local officials and corporate representatives." Ben Friedman, NOAA's acting administrator "informed the committee’s chair that the agency would not renew the panel" on August 18, 2017.) that he was dissolving the Federal Advisory Committee. The Federal Advisory Panel translating the NCA's scientific studies and findings into actionable public policy that individual states could implement to reduce emissions. According to an August 20, 2017 article in the Washington Post, the role of the Federal Advisory Panel for the National Climate Assessment was to assist "policymakers and private-sector officials incorporate the government’s climate analysis into long-term planning". The panel was tasked with translating dozens of studies and scientific revelations that constitute the National Climate Assessment into policy actions that states could use to reduce greenhouse gas emissions. In January 2018 Andrew Cuomo, Governor of the State of New York, part of a coalition of States, reconvened a modified and limited version of the science advisory panel chaired by Columbia University's Earth Institute's Richard Moss. The States' panel cannot "replace federal support for science, including maintaining satellites and building better climate models" nor will it have any "sway over federal climate policy".

== Key findings ==
An article in The Atlantic said that the report "warns, repeatedly and directly, that climate change could soon imperil the American way of life, transforming every region of the country, imposing frustrating costs on the economy, and harming the health of virtually every citizen."

In the section on mitigation, the report says that without more significant mitigation efforts, there will be "substantial damages on the U.S. economy, human health, and the environment. Under scenarios with high emissions and limited or no adaptation, annual losses in some sectors are estimated to grow to hundreds of billions of dollars by the end of the century." The report cited a 2017 study, published in the journal Science, that estimated the economic damage to the U.S. economy in relation to increases in the global mean surface temperature (GMST).

The report said that across the United States damages are "intensifying". The report which analyzed the "effects of climate change by U.S. region", emphasize[d] that "poor and marginalized communities" will be the most negatively "impacted by the intensifying storms and weather patterns caused by global warming."

"While Americans are responding in ways that can bolster resilience and improve livelihoods, neither global efforts to mitigate the causes of climate change nor regional efforts to adapt to the impacts currently approach the scales needed to avoid substantial damages to the U.S. economy, environment, and human health and well-being over the coming decades."

=== Volume 1 ===
A 2018 CRS cited the October 2017 "Climate Science Special Report" CSSR: "Detection and attribution studies, climate models, observations, paleoclimate data, and physical understanding lead to high confidence (extremely likely) that more than half of the observed global mean warming since 1951 was caused by humans, and high confidence that internal climate variability played only a minor role (and possibly even a negative contribution) in the observed warming since 1951. The key message and supporting text summarizes extensive evidence documented in the peer-reviewed detection and attribution literature, including in the IPCC Fifth Assessment Report."

=== Volume 2 ===
According to Volume II, "Impacts, Risks, and Adaptation in the United States", "Without substantial and sustained global mitigation and regional adaptation efforts, climate change is expected to cause growing losses to American infrastructure and property and impede the rate of economic growth over this century." The National Oceanic and Atmospheric Administration (NOAA) was "administrative lead agency" in the preparation of the Fourth National Climate Assessment.

==== Chapters (Volume 2) ====
Volume 2 of NCA4 has fifteen chapters: Chapter 1: Our Globally Changing Climate Chapter 2: "Physical Drivers of Climate Change", Chapter 3: "Detection and Attribution of Climate Change", Chapter 4: "Climate Models, Scenarios, and Projections", Chapter 5: "Large-Scale Circulation and Climate Variability", Chapter 6: "Temperature Changes in the United States", Chapter 7: "Precipitation Change in the United States", Chapter 8: "Droughts, Floods, and Wildfire", Chapter 9: "Extreme Storms", Chapter 10: "Changes in Land Cover and Terrestrial Biogeochemistry", Chapter 11: "Arctic Changes and their Effects on Alaska and the Rest of the United States", Chapter 12: "Sea Level Rise", Chapter 13: "Ocean Acidification and Other Ocean Changes", Chapter 14: "Perspectives on Climate Change Mitigation", and Chapter 15: "Potential Surprises: Compound Extremes and Tipping Elements".

Chapter one provided an overview. "Risks are often highest for those that are already vulnerable, including low-income communities, some communities of color, children, and the elderly...Climate change threatens to exacerbate existing social and economic inequalities that result in higher exposure and sensitivity to extreme weather and climate-related events and other changes."

Chapter 2, entitled "Our Changing Climate: Observations, Causes, and Future Change", reported on observed changes in the United States, such as "intensifying" and more frequent atmospheric rivers of rain that connect Asia with the United States, "[h]igh temperature extremes", increasing "heavy precipitation events", retreating glaciers and shrinking snow cover, the decline of sea ice, warming, sea level rising and increasing ocean acidification, more frequent flooding along the coastlines, lengthening growing seasons, and increasing wildfires.

== Reactions ==
President Trump states "I've seen it, I've read some of it and it's fine." and "I don't believe it."

In a November 26 scrum with reporters in Washington, DC, President Trump told reporters he had seen and read some of the report but he doesn't believe it. The White House dismissed the NCA4 as "inaccurate". White House spokesperson, Lindsay Walters said that the climate report was "largely based on the most extreme scenario". Walters called for future NCA reports to have a "more transparent and data-driven process that includes fuller information on the range of potential scenarios and outcomes". Katharine Hayhoe, an atmospheric scientist from Texas Tech University said that Walters' claim was "demonstrably false". Hayhoe confirmed that the report "considers all scenarios, from those where we go carbon negative before end of century to those where carbon emissions continue to rise".

The New York Times reported "White House officials made a calculation that Mr. Trump’s core base of supporters most likely would not care that its findings are so at odds with the president’s statements and policies.” Steven Milloy, a climate-change denier who served on Trump's EPA transition team, called the report a product of the deep state, adding "We don’t care. In our view, this is made-up hysteria anyway." He noted that the Administration did not alter the report's findings but rather chose to release it the day after Thanksgiving "on a day when nobody cares, and hope it gets swept away by the next day’s news."

An article in The Atlantic called the report "massive", a "grave climate warning", and a "huge achievement for American science".

Both The Washington Post and Vox described the report as "major". The Post described it as the Trump administration's climate report. Vox news described it as "dire".

A November 23, 2018 Reuters article published in The New York Times cited the NCA4: "With continued growth in emissions at historic rates, annual losses in some economic sectors are projected to reach hundreds of billions of dollars by the end of the century - more than the current gross domestic product (GDP) of many U.S. states." In July 2019 the Times cited the NCA4 in its own reporting to underscore the threat of sea level rise to the trillion-dollar coastal real estate market.

Articles in Reuters/The New York Times, and the BBC, said that the warning issued by the 4th NCA "is at odds with the Trump administration's fossil fuels agenda."

An article in The Hill described the report as "damning", 'sounding the alarm' on the impact of climate change and contrasted the findings of NCA4 with doubts about climate change science expressed by President Trump.

An article in The Verge called it a "bleak black Friday report."

An article in the Los Angeles Times said that the release of NCA4 was important in "tackling a misconception by many Americans that the changing climate doesn’t harm them personally." The report shows "how climate change is already affecting each one of us, whether we live in Texas or Minnesota or Hawai’i or Florida."

Collin O'Mara, President of the National Wildlife Federation (NWF) issued a statement in which he called the timing of the Black Friday release by the White House of the NCA4 report—a month before its anticipated release—a "disgrace". O’Mara said that, "It’s an absolute disgrace to bury the truth about climate impacts in a year that saw hundreds of Americans die during devastating climate-fueled megafires, hurricanes, floods, and algal blooms." (Note: The White House announced on November 21 that it would be releasing the NCA4 report findings on Black Friday.) (Note: Collin O’Mara, NWF President's press release November 21, 2018: "It’s an absolute disgrace to bury the truth about climate impacts in a year that saw hundreds of Americans die during devastating climate-fueled megafires, hurricanes, floods, and algal blooms. Releasing the National Climate Assessment on Black Friday won’t obscure the fact that authorities are still identifying bodies in California’s unprecedented megafires, Florida is still dealing with toxic algae outbreaks fueled by warmer water, and Americans are still picking up the pieces from Hurricanes Florence and Michael and Typhoon Yutu that were worsened by climate change. Following upon the recent IPCC report, this analysis is a clarion call for Congress to address climate pollution and community resilience with absolute urgency.")

In a November 23, 2018 press release, the Union of Concerned Scientists (UCS) described how the 1,500-page report was based on "the best available science" and serves to assist the U.S. in "understand[ing], assess[ing], predict[ing] and respond[ing] to" climate change. It "examines the climate and economic impacts U.S. residents could expect if drastic action is not taken to address climate change". (Note: Brenda Ekwurzel is a NCA4 Report Author and Senior UCS Climate Scientist.)

In May 2019, The New York Times reported that the Trump administration was planning to make changes in the climate modeling methods used to create the next report which is due in 2022. Rather than project impacts of change to the end of the century as has been done in the past, they will project only to 2040. The administration is also planning to create a climate change review panel that would question the conclusions of the 2022 report. The Times reported that William Happer, who "would be a fringe figure even for climate skeptics", would head the panel.

== See also ==
- National Research Council, report on climate change
- Presidential Climate Action Plan
- State of the Climate
- Climate security
