= Maria Carmen Lemos =

Maria Carmen de Mello Lemos
- Education: PhD Political Science, Massachusetts Institute of Technology – MIT MSc. Political Science, Massachusetts Institute of Technology – MIT B.S. Economics, Universidade Federal de Juiz de Fora – UFJF (Brazil)
- Occupations: Climate policy analyst, professor, senior policy scholar, author, science communicator, mentor
- Organization(s): Icarus (Initiative on Climate Adaptation Research and Understanding through the Social Sciences)
- Known for: Environmental policy writer, climate adaptation analyst
- Notable work: IPCC-AR5 —Chapter 20: Climate-resilient Pathways, NCA4—Chapter 21: Midwest, IPCC-AR4 – Group 7: Industry, Settlement and Society
- Honours: Member of the National Academy of Sciences, James Martin 21st Century School Fellowship, Kavli Fellow.

Maria Carmen de Mello Lemos is Professor of Environment and Sustainability and co-director of the Great Lakes Integrated Sciences and Assessments Center at the University of Michigan, Ann Arbor, and Senior Policy Scholar at the Udall Center for the Study of Public Policy at the University of Arizona. Lemos is an established climate policy analyst whose research focuses primarily on environmental public policymaking in Latin America and the US, especially related to climate change adaptation and adaptive capacity building.

== Early life and education ==
Lemos earned her B.S. in Economics from the Universidade Federal de Juiz de Fora, as well as a MSc. and a PhD in Political Science from the Massachusetts Institute of Technology.

== Career ==
=== Research ===
Lemos has overseen and empirically investigated numerous co-production projects, has worked with a number of knowledge networks, and has decades of experience leading interdisciplinary teams to convey scientific information across diverse audiences. She is also involved in research on the socioenvironmental vulnerability of poor inhabitants of the Mexico/U.S. border region.

During 2006–2007 she was a James Martin 21st Century School Fellow at the Environmental Change Institute at Oxford University. She was a lead author of the Intergovernmental Panel on Climate Change Fifth Assessment Report (IPCC-AR5—Chapter 20 Climate-resilient Pathways) and the Fourth US National Climate Assessment (NCA4)—Chapter 21 Midwest), as well as a contributing author to the Intergovernmental Panel on Climate Change Fourth Assessment Report (IPCC-AR4 — Group 7: Industry, Settlement and Society).

Lemos has served in a number of US National Research Council of the National Academies of Sciences committees, including Restructuring Federal Climate Research to Meet the Challenges of Climate Change (2007 and 2009), America's Climate Choice Science Panel (2010), the Board on Environmental Change and Society (2008–2014), the Council Committee to Advise the U.S. Global Change Research Program (2011–2013), the Societal Expert Action Network (SEAN) (2021–present), and the Board for Atmospheric Sciences (BASC, 2023–present). She is also the co-founder of Icarus (Initiative on Climate Adaptation Research and Understanding through the Social Sciences), which seeks to foster collaboration and exchange between scholars focusing on vulnerability and adaptation to climate change.

=== Notable publications ===
- Lemos, M. C., K. S. Wolske, L. V. Rasmussen, J. C. Arnott, M. Kalcic and C. J. Kirchhoff (2019). "The Closer, the Better? Untangling Scientist–Practitioner Engagement, Interaction, and Knowledge Use." Weather, Climate, and Society 11(3): 535–548.
- Moss, R. H., S. Avery, K. Baja, M. Burkett, A. M. Chischilly, J. Dell, P. A. Fleming, K. Geil, K. Jacobs, A. Jones, K. Knowlton, J. Koh, M. C. Lemos, J. Melillo, R. Pandya, T. C. Richmond, L. Scarlett, J. Snyder, M. Stults, A. M. Waple, J. Whitehead, D. Zarrilli, B. M. Ayyub, J. Fox, A. Ganguly, L. Joppa, S. Julius, P. Kirshen, R. Kreutter, A. McGovern, R. Meyer, J. Neumann, W. Solecki, J. Smith, P. Tissot, G. Yohe and R. Zimmerman (2019). "Evaluating Knowledge to Support Climate Action: A Framework for Sustained Assessment. Report of an Independent Advisory Committee on Applied Climate Assessment." Weather, Climate, and Society 11(3): 465–487.
- US Fourth National Climate Assessment. Angel, J., C. Swanston, B.M. Boustead, K.C. Conlon, K.R. Hall, J.L. Jorns, K.E. Kunkel, M.C. Lemos, B. Lofgren, T.A. Ontl, J. Posey, K. Stone, G. Takle, and D. Todey, 2018: Midwest. In Impacts, Risks, and Adaptation in the United States: Fourth National Climate Assessment, Volume II[Reidmiller, D.R., C.W. Avery, D.R. Easterling, K.E. Kunkel, K.L.M. Lewis, T.K. Maycock, and B.C. Stewart (eds.)]. U.S. Global Change Research Program, Washington, DC, USA, pp. 872–940. doi: 10.7930/NCA4.2018.CH21
- Trueblood, D., S. Almazán-Casali, J. Arnott, M. Brass, M. C. Lemos, K. Matso, J. Read, L. Vaccaro and J. Wondolleck (2019). "Advancing Knowledge for Use in Coastal and Estuarine Management: Competitive Research in the National Estuarine Research Reserve System." Coastal Management 47(3): 337–346.
- Lemos, M. C., J. Arnott, N. M. Ardoin, K. Baja, A. Bednarek, A. Dewulf, C. Fieseler, K. Goodrich, K. Jagannathan, N. Klenk, K. J. Mach, A. M. Meadow, R. Meyer, R. Moss, L. Nichols, K. D. Sjostrom, M. Stults, E. Turnhout, C. Vaughan, G. Wong-Parodi and C. Wyborn (2018). "To co-produce or not to co-produce." Nature Sustainability VOL 1: 722–724.
- Lemos, M. C., H. Eakin, L. Dilling and J. Worl (2018). "Social Sciences, Weather, and Climate Change." Meteorological Monographs 59: 26.21–26.25.
- Eakin, H., T. A. Muñoz-Erickson and M. C. Lemos (2018). "Critical Lines of Action for Vulnerability and Resilience Research and Practice: Lessons from the 2017 Hurricane Season." Journal of Extreme Events 05(02n03): 1850015.
- Bedran-Martins, A. M., M. C. Lemos & A. Philippi (2018) Relationship between subjective wellbeing and material quality of life in face of climate vulnerability in NE Brazil. Climatic Change, 147, 283–297.
- Haigh, T., V. Koundinya, C. Hart, J. Klink, M. Lemos, A. S. Mase, L. Prokopy, A. Singh, D. Todey and M. Widhalm (2018). "Provision of Climate Services for Agriculture: Public and Private Pathways to Farm Decision-Making." Bulletin of the American Meteorological Society 99(9): 1781–1790.
- Tian, Q. and M. C. Lemos (2018) Household Livelihood Differentiation and Vulnerability to Climate Hazards in Rural China. World Development, 108, 321–331.
- Tian, Q., L. Jiang, M. Lemos & S. Qi (2018) Interactions of social, natural, and technological subsystems and synergy between development and adaptation to floods around Poyang Lake. Annals of GIS, 1–12.
- Lemos, M. C. (2015). Usable climate knowledge for adaptive and co-managed water governance. Current Opinion in Environmental Sustainability, 12: 48–52.
- Agrawal, A. and M. C. Lemos (2015). "Adaptive development." Nature Climate Change 5(3): 185–187.
- Haigh, T., L. W. Morton, M.C. Lemos, L. Prokopy, J. Angel and Y.J. Lo (2015) "Agricultural Advisors as Climate Information Intermediaries: Exploring Differences in Capacity to Communicate Climate" Weather, Climate and Society, Vol. 7, No. 1, pp. 83–93.
- Kalafatis, S. E., M. C. Lemos, Y.-J. Lo and K. A. Frank (2015). "Increasing information usability for climate adaptation: The role of knowledge networks and communities of practice." Global Environmental Change 32: 30–39.
- Prokopy, L. S., J. S. Carlton, J. G. Arbuckle Jr, T. Haigh, M. C. Lemos, A. S. Mase, N. Babin, M. Dunn, J. Andresen and J. Angel (2015). "Extension′ s role in disseminating information about climate change to agricultural stakeholders in the United States." Climatic Change: 1–12.

=== National and synthesis reports ===
- US Fourth National Climate Assessment (2018). Midwest: In Impacts, Risks, and Adaptation in the United States, Volume II
- IPCC AR-5 WGII (2014) Chapter 20. Climate-Resilient Pathways: Adaptation, Mitigation, and Sustainable Development.
- National Research Council (2013). A Review of the Draft 2013 of the National Climate Assessment.
- National Research Council (2012). A Review of the USGCRP Draft Strategic Plan. Committee to Advise the U.S. Global Change Research Program (USGCRP).
- National Research Council (2010). Advancing the Science of Climate Change. America's Climate Choices: Panel on Advancing the Science of Climate Change.
- National Research Council (2009). Restructuring Federal Climate Research to Meet the Challenges of Climate Change. Committee on Strategic Advice on the US Climate Change Science Program.
- U.S. Climate Change Science Program and the Subcommittee on Global Change Research (2008). Looking Toward the Future. In: Decision-Support Experiments and Evaluations using Seasonal-to-Interannual Forecasts and Observational Data: A Focus on Water Resources. A Synthesis Assessment (SAP 5.3).
- Human Development Report Office (2007). Drought, Governance and Adaptive Capacity in North East Brazil: A Case Study of Ceará. In Fighting climate change: Human solidarity in a divided world.
- Contribution of Working Group II to the Fourth Assessment Report of the Intergovernmental Panel on Climate Change (2007). Impacts, Adaptation and Vulnerability.
- National Research Council (2007). Evaluating Progress of the U.S. Climate Change Science Program: Methods and Preliminary Results.

=== Other affiliations ===
- Advisory Board—Latin American and Caribbean Studies, University of Michigan, 2005–present
- Advisory Board, Research Application Laboratory (RAL), National Center for Atmospheric Research (NCAR), (2013–2016)
- The National Academies/National Research Council Committee on Human Dimensions of Global Change/Board of Environment Change and Society, (2008–present)
- The National Academies/National Research Council Committee to Advise the U.S. Global Change Research Program (USGCRP) (2011–13)
- Graham Environmental Sustainability Institute Executive Committee. 2012–present
- Global Engagement Committee (SNRE), 2013–2015, Chair
- UM Eisenberg Civic Engagement Committee, 2017–present
- CIGLR Scientific Committee 2017–present
- Visiting Professor – Columbia University Biosphere II Earth Semester – Oracle, AZ 1997–1998
- James Martin 21st Century School Fellow – Oxford University – Environmental Change Institute (ECI) – Oxford, England 2006–2007
- Faculty Fellow, Global Environmental Assessment (GEA) Project – Harvard University – John F. Kennedy School of Government 1999–2001

== Awards and achievements ==
- Graduate Studies Scholarship – CAPES, Brazilian Ministry of Education, 1988–1992.
- MIT-Center for International Studies/MacArthur Program in Transnational Security Summer Research Grant, 1992.
- MIT-Center for International Studies International Energy and Environment Policy Grants, Japan Endowment Fund, Japanese Ministry of Foreign Affairs. Dissertation Grant 1991–1992.
- James Martin 21st Century School Fellowship, Environmental Change Institute, Oxford University, England. July 2006 – 2007.
- Kavli Fellow, US National Academy of Sciences, 2007.
- Certificate of Tribute by Governor Jennifer M. Grandholm (Michigan) to honor contributions to the science of global climate change" in conjunction with "the Intergovernmental Panel on Climate Change (IPCC), 2008.
- National Science Foundation Distinguished Lecture. "Building Adaptive Capacity to Climate Change". March 12, 2015. Washington DC.
- The Governor's Award for Environmental Excellence. Office of the Governor, Indiana. U2U—for Useful to Usable, a research project focused on improving climate decision making among corn farmers in IN, MI, IA and NE and funded by the US Department of Agriculture (USADA).
