= Rick S. Piltz =

Senior associate in the U.S. Climate Change Science Program (1943–2014)

Frederick Steven "Rick" Piltz (July 29, 1943 – October 18, 2014) was a former senior associate in the U.S. Climate Change Science Program. In March 2005, he resigned over political interference in the program's climate change reports. In June 2005, the New York Times exposed the role of Philip Cooney in editing government documents on climate change to create an appearance of scientific uncertainty. A former lobbyist with the American Petroleum Institute, Cooney resigned and days later took a job at ExxonMobil.

Piltz went on to found Climate Science Watch, a project to hold public officials accountable for using climate science with integrity in policy making. Climate Science Watch is a program of the Government Accountability Project, a whistleblower protection agency in Washington, D.C.

== Politicization of science ==
Piltz spent 14 years in various positions in Washington closely following how global warming science is misused by the government and special interest groups. From 1995, he served in senior positions in the Climate Change Science Program, before resigning in March 2005. In his resignation letter, he wrote, "I believe the overarching problem is that the [Bush] Administration...does not want and has acted to impede forthright communication of the state of climate science and its implication for society."

Within months, the New York Times exposed White House operative Philip Cooney for editing government climate documents to increase uncertainty about the science. Cooney resigned and joined ExxonMobil.

Piltz also states that forces within the Bush administration have sought to hide the results from the National Assessment on Climate Change.

== Government watchdog ==
Piltz founded Climate Science Watch in the summer of 2005. The group tracks and investigates climate science policy developments in the news and occasionally publishes leaked documents from government insiders.

Piltz testified twice before Congress since creating Climate Science Watch.

== Personal life ==
Piltz was born in Detroit, Michigan. In October 2014, Piltz died at a hospice in Washington, D.C. of bladder cancer at the age of 71. Piltz was a B.A. (1965), M.A. (1967) graduate of the University of Michigan.

Since going public with the White House's attempts to undermine the science on climate change, Piltz has been interviewed by a number of media venues including 60 Minutes, Frontline, The Guardian, PBS, the Canadian Broadcasting Corporation, and the science journal Environmental Science & Technology. He is also a central character in the award-winning documentary Everything's Cool.

== Awards ==
Piltz was awarded the Ridenhour Prize for Truth-Telling in 2006 for his work to prevent the politicization of climate science reporting in the federal government. The prize is awarded to a citizen, corporate, or government whistleblower, investigative journalist, or organization for bringing a specific issue of social importance to the public's attention.

== See also ==
- Climate change policy of the United States
