= Environmental policy of the second Trump administration =

The environmental policy of the second Trump administration was a shift from the Biden administration. The Trump administration has prioritized economic concerns over environmental ones, advocated for increased oil production, and has withdrawn the United States from the Paris Climate Agreement.

== Appointments ==
=== Environmental Protection Agency Administrator ===
Lee Zeldin was selected as the Trump administration's administrator of the Environmental Protection Agency (EPA) in November 2024. James Payne was appointed as acting administrator of the EPA on January 20, 2025, until Zeldin was approved by the Senate. Zeldin was confirmed by the Senate on January 29, 2025, by a 56 to 42 vote.

=== Department of Energy ===
In November 2024, the Trump administration selected Chris Wright to be the Secretary of Energy. Wright was confirmed by the Senate on February 3, 2025.

== Domestic policy ==
At a private dinner at Mar-a-Lago in April 2024, Trump encouraged fossil fuel companies to donate to his campaign, saying that he would roll back environmental regulations if elected. Trump's transition team for climate and the environment was led by David Bernhardt, a former oil lobbyist who served as interior secretary, and Andrew R. Wheeler, a former coal lobbyist who led the EPA under Trump. The team withdrew from the Paris Agreement for a second time (the only country in the world to do so), expand drilling and mining on public land, and dismantle offices working to end pollution. Trump pledged to redraw the boundaries of the Bears Ears and Grand Staircase–Escalante National Monuments as he did in his first term, end a pause on new natural gas export terminals that began under President Joe Biden, and prevent states from setting their own pollution standards.

On his first day in office, Trump declared a "national energy emergency" despite the U.S.'s producing more oil and exporting more natural gas than any other country. Trump also signed the Initial Rescissions of Harmful Executive Orders and Actions.

On January 20, 2025, Trump signed Executive Order 14154 (Unleashing American Energy) which orders

- agencies to "develop and begin implementing action plans to suspend, revise, or rescind all agency actions identified as unduly burdensome" "on the identification, development, or use of domestic energy resources—with particular attention to oil, natural gas, coal, hydropower, biofuels, critical mineral, and nuclear energy resources"
- the attorney general to request that courts "stay or otherwise delay further litigation, or seek other appropriate relief consistent with this order"
- revoking "All activities, programs, and operations associated with the American Climate Corps"
- rescinding Council on Environmental Quality's National Environmental Policy Act regulations in their entirety
- "all agencies must prioritize efficiency and certainty over any other objectives".
- The Director of the NEC and the Director of the Office of Legislative Affairs shall jointly prepare recommendations to Congress, which shall "provide greater certainty in the Federal permitting process, including, but not limited to, streamlining the judicial review of the application of NEPA".
- "eliminating the “social cost of carbon” calculation from any Federal permitting or regulatory decision"
- reconsideration of the endangerment finding
- agencies pause the disbursement of funds appropriated through the Inflation Reduction Act of 2022 or the Infrastructure Investment and Jobs Act, "including but not limited to funds for electric vehicle charging stations made available through the National Electric Vehicle Infrastructure Formula Program and the Charging and Fueling Infrastructure Discretionary Grant Program"
- restarting reviews of applications for approvals of liquified natural gas export projects "as expeditiously as possible"
- undertaking steps to revise or rescind "all agency actions that impose undue burdens on the domestic mining and processing of non-fuel minerals"
- reassessing public lands withdrawals
- prioritizing efforts to accelerate the ongoing, detailed geologic mapping of the United States, with a focus on locating previously unknown deposits of critical minerals
- ensuring "that critical mineral projects, including the processing of critical minerals, receive consideration for Federal support"
- assessing "whether exploitative practices and state-assisted mineral projects abroad are unlawful or unduly burden or restrict United States commerce"
- assessing "the quantity and inflow of minerals that are likely the product of forced labor into the United States and whether such inflows pose a threat to national security"
- ensuring "that the National Defense Stockpile will provide a robust supply of critical minerals in event of future shortfall"
- "policy recommendations to enhance the competitiveness of American mining and refining companies in other mineral-wealthy nations"

Trump also appointed oil, gas, and chemical industry lobbyists to the Environmental Protection Agency to roll back climate rules and pollution controls.

In February 2025, the administration terminated the Environmental and Climate Justice Block Grant Program. In June 2026, district judge Richard Gergel ruled that the terminations were unlawful and in July 2026 a federal judge ordered the program's remaining $2.8 billion in funds be distributed.

In March 2025, the Environmental Protection Agency announced the "Biggest Deregulatory Action in U.S. History".

By the end of its fourth month, Trump's second administration had reduced staffing at several major federal environmental agencies; reduced regulations against air pollution; stopped tracking major sources of greenhouse gases that cause global warming and climate change; expedited approvals for fossil fuel projects; expanded logging permits in national forests; dismissed scientists working on the Congressionally mandated National Climate Assessment; purged the phrases "climate crisis" and "climate science" from government websites; and transferred some responsibility for disaster management to the states despite there having been 27 billion-dollar disasters in 2024 (versus 3 such disasters in 1980).

During the 2025 shutdown, the administration retained federal employees that "issue permits for oil, gas and mining operations are on the job, along with those working to repeal pollution limits."

In June 2026, the Department of Justice issued a legal filing to dismiss a citizen suit filed by the NAACP against xAI which alleged that xAI used methane gas turbines to power its AI data centers without proper permits or pollution controls in violation of the Clean Air Act. The filing argued that citizen suits could not proceed when the executive branch does not oppose the polluting behavior.

== Climate and energy policy ==
Trump ordered the pause on disbursement of climate-related funds issued by the IRA and BIL, and falsely conflated the funds with the "Green New Deal". In February 2025, the FBI, Treasury Department, and EPA requested that Citibank freeze bank accounts of nonprofit organizations (including Climate United) that received funding under the Greenhouse Gas Reduction Fund, created by Congress in 2022 as part of the Inflation Reduction Act. Citibank froze the accounts. The FBI also asked Citibank to freeze accounts of Habitat for Humanity, United Way, the Colorado Clean Energy Fund and the New York State Department of Taxation and Finance. Three nonprofit organizations challenged the actions in court. In April 2025, Trump issued Executive Order 14260 (Protecting American Energy From State Overreach) which directs the attorney general to "identify and take action against state laws and policies that burden the use of domestic energy resources and that are unconstitutional, preempted by federal law, or otherwise unenforceable". Also in April, the administration fired all staffers working on the congressionally-mandated National Climate Assessment. The administration proposed rescinding the 2001 roadless rule.

In 2025, the Justice Department sued New York and Vermont over their climate superfund laws and "Hawaii and Michigan to prevent each state from suing fossil fuel companies in state court to seek damages for alleged climate change harms." After the lawsuit against Hawaii was dismissed in 2026, the administration sued Minnesota, challenging a 2020 lawsuit by Attorney General Keith Ellison against the American Petroleum Institute, Exxon Mobil and Koch Industries.

=== Coal ===
In April 2025, the Interior Department announced it would "officially end its moratorium on federal coal leasing". In September 2025, the administration announced a $625 million investment "to expand and reinvigorate America's coal industry", while paring back renewable energy subsidies, and that it was opening 13.1 million acres of federal land for coal leasing. Trump signed Executive Order 14261 (Reinvigorating America's Beautiful Clean Coal Industry and Amending Executive Order 14241) which orders "prioritizing coal leasing and related activities (...) as the primary land use for the public lands with coal resources identified (...) and expedite coal leasing in these areas, including by utilizing such emergency authorities as are available to them and identifying opportunities to provide for expedited environmental reviews" and states:

It is the policy of the United States that coal is essential to our national and economic security. It is a national priority to support the domestic coal industry by removing Federal regulatory barriers that undermine coal production, encouraging the utilization of coal to meet growing domestic energy demands, increasing American coal exports, and ensuring that Federal policy does not discriminate against coal production or coal-fired electricity generation.

On February 11, 2026, Trump signed an executive order titled "Strengthening United States National Defense with America's Beautiful Clean Coal Power Generation Fleet," directing the Secretary of War, in coordination with the Secretary of Energy, to procure power from coal-fired generation facilities through long-term Power Purchase Agreements to serve Department of War installations and other mission-critical facilities. The order cites the national energy emergency declared under Executive Order 14156 and builds on prior orders Executive Order 14261 (Reinvigorating America's Beautiful Clean Coal Industry) and Executive Order 14262 (Strengthening the Reliability and Security of the United States Electric Grid), with priority given to projects that enhance grid reliability and blackout prevention, on-site fuel security, and mission assurance for defense and intelligence capabilities.

=== Nuclear energy ===
In May 2025, Trump signed Executive Order 14302, seeking to speed up and expand the permitting of nuclear power plants.

=== Solar and wind power ===
Trump's push to unleash energy has not included solar and wind. On January 20, 2025, Trump issued the Presidential Memorandum on Wind Energy which paused federal permitting for wind farms. The administration withdrew or terminated $679 million in funding for 12 offshore wind projects across the United States, halted Revolution Wind and Empire Wind and moved to cancel approval of Lava Ridge Wind Project.

During his second administration, Trump issued an executive order to halt the approval of offshore wind projects. Trump's administration cited national security reasons for the executive order. Tax credits for wind projects were largely eliminated by the One Big Beautiful Bill Act. A court struck down Trump's executive order to halt the approval of new wind projects. The Trump administration gave 1 billion dollars to TotalEnergies to refund its offshore wind leases in North Carolina and New York and invest in fossil fuel projects.

=== Energy efficiency ===
After initially planning to eliminate the Energy Star program, the EPA backtracked.

=== Potential impact on trade ===
Those policies can significantly hurt American economy as countries responsible for more than two thirds of the US goods export entered the Open Coalition on Compliance Carbon Markets which will probably include border tax on goods with big carbon footprint. The US industry is generally considered as low carbon but this advantage can disappear due to the environmental policy of Donald Trump.

=== Climate and emissions data ===
The EPA said it would stop updating one of the most viewed federal datasets after its creator was suspended for joining the EPA Letter of Dissent organized by Stand Up for Science 2025.

The EPA also proposed ending the Greenhouse Gas Reporting Program which requires polluters to report emissions.

=== Toxic chemical pollution ===
In March 2025, the EPA set up an email to allow "the regulated community to request a Presidential Exemption under section 112(i)(4) of the Clean Air Act". In July 2025, the Trump administration exempted more than 100 plants from pollution limits established by the Biden administration. The limits reduce the releases of toxic chemicals, including carcinogenic. One of them reduces cancer risks of people living within 6.2 miles (10 km) of a chemical plant by 96%. Four proclamations were issued. One exempts about 40 medical device sterilizing plants from requirements to reduce by 90% of the emissions of cancer-causing ethylene oxide. The second exempts more than 50 chemical companies and oil refineries from requirements to reduce emissions of toxic chemicals including ethylene oxide and another cancer-linked chemical called chloroprene. A third exempts 8 producers of taconite iron ore, from reducing mercury emissions linked to brain and nervous system damage by about 33%. The fourth exempts 6 coal plants from reducing release of mercury, nickel, arsenic, and lead, which can cause developmental delays in children, as well as heart attacks and cancer. Trump signed Proclamation 10993 exempting coke ovens from a rule against increasing pollution. It also moved to abandon all efforts to regulate greenhouse gases by reversing the endangerment finding. On July 29, 2025, the Energy Department released A Critical Review of Impacts of Greenhouse Gas Emissions on the U.S. Climate promoting climate change denial and misinformation written by prominent climate skeptics who were given government jobs. Scientists widely criticized the report for an abundance of errors and denial of the scientific consensus on climate change.

In March 2025, the EPA and the Army proposed limiting the bodies of water covered under the Clean Water Act and "fully implement the U.S. Supreme Court's decision in Sackett v. Environmental Protection Agency". In May 2025, the EPA announced it planned to "extend the compliance date" on limits on forever chemicals in drinking water.

Under the administration, cases against polluters decreased with the administration reaching 18 settlements in the first six-month compared to 53 during the Biden administration. A rule stated "Mindful that the Supreme Court recently clarified NEPA is a “purely procedural statute,” DOI will henceforth maintain the remainder of its NEPA procedures—which apply only to DOI's internal processes—in a Handbook separate from the Code of Federal Regulations".

The EPA proposed extending the compliance deadlines on the use of HFCs in a number of applications.

=== Conservation ===
Trump signed proclamations to open the Pacific Islands Heritage Marine National Monument, Northeast Canyons and Seamounts Marine National Monument, Mau and Ho'omalu Zones of the Papahānaumokuākea Marine National Monument, Islands Unit of the Mariana Trench Marine National Monument and Rose Atoll Marine National Monument to commercial fishing.

In June 2025, Trump signed a memorandum pulling the federal government out of a deal with Northwest Indigenous tribes to save endangered salmon which are affected by hydroelectric dams.

The administration announced it would open the Arctic National Wildlife Refuge for oil and gas leasing and allow a road through the Izembek National Wildlife Refuge. Protections on more than 13 million acres of the National Petroleum Reserve–Alaska was revoked and, pursuant to the One Big Beautiful Bill, the Interior Department announced it will lease areas of the National Petroleum Reserve–Alaska for oil and gas. Trump allowed the Ambler Road. In August 2025, the Interior Department announced new hunting and sport fishing opportunities across more than 87,000 acres (35,000 ha) within the National Wildlife Refuge System and National Fish Hatchery System. The administration weakened the Endangered Species Act. The administration proposed rescinding the Public Lands Rule which "made conservation (i.e., no use) an official use of public lands, putting it on the same level as BLM’s other uses of public lands". The 2026–2031 National Outer Continental Shelf Oil and Gas Leasing Program was announced, a proposal to lease areas covering over a billion acres to oil drilling off the coast of Alaska, in the Gulf of Mexico, and along the Pacific. The contract for the sole individual responsible for orphaned wells in National Parks was not renewed.

In March 2026, Trump invoked the god squad provision of the Endangered Species Act to revoke protections for endangered species in the Gulf of Mexico in order to expand oil and gas operations in the gulf.

== Foreign policy ==
At the UN in 2025, Trump called climate change the "greatest con job ever perpetrated on the world". There was described as being "few issues on which the United States is more diplomatically isolated from the rest of the world than climate change".

=== Treaties ===
The administration has pushed other countries to loosen environmental rules including threatening to retaliate against countries that voted for the IMO Net-Zero Framework and urging countries to reject the global plastic pollution treaty. Nine diplomats from the United States, Europe, and developing nations anonymously told the New York Times that US threats effectively ended the deal.

==== Paris Climate Agreement ====
President Trump signed Executive Order 14162 to withdraw the United States from the Paris Climate Agreement, which he had also done previously in his first administration. The withdrawal took effect on January 27, 2026, due to the requirement of paragraph 2 of article 28 of the Paris Climate Agreement that requires withdrawals to take effect 1 year after the Depositary receives a notification of withdrawal.

=== United Nations ===
In April 2025, the State Department eliminated the U.S. Special Presidential Envoy for Climate. The United States did not send any representatives to COP 30. The United States notified the United Nations that they would withdraw from the United Nations Framework Convention on Climate Change effective February 2027 on February 2026.

== Lawsuits ==
In Friends of the Everglades, Inc. v. Noem, the US Court of Appeals for the Eleventh Circuit ruled that a detention center in the Florida Everglades didn't violate the National Environmental Policy Act because it wasn't federally controlled. Lighthiser v. Trump argued that Trump's energy executive orders violated their rights under the Due Process Clause, but the case was dismissed.
