= Presidential Climate Action Plan =

Environmental plan by U.S. President Barack Obama

The Climate Action Plan is an environmental plan by Barack Obama, the 44th President of the United States, that proposed a reduction in carbon dioxide emissions. It included preserving forests, encouraging alternate fuels, and increasing the study of climate change. The plan was first prepared in 2008 and was then updated every two years.

President Obama's last Climate Action Plan, issued in June 2013, included regulations for the industry with the ultimate goal of cutting domestic carbon emission, preparing the U.S. for impending effects of climate change, and working internationally to address climate change. Among the regulations outlined in the plan were initiatives to increase natural disaster preparedness, create and improve existing hospitals, and modernize infrastructure to withstand better extreme weather.

The plan would have supported the conservation of land and water resources and developed actionable climate science, and encouraged other countries to take action to address climate change, including reducing deforestation and lowering subsidies that increase the use of fossil fuels. The plan specifically mentioned methane, building efficiency, wind, solar and hydroelectricity.

White House staff members who were directly tasked with the implementation of the plan included Heather Zichal and Michelle Patron.

== Cancellation and reinstatement of the Climate Action Plan ==
On the first day of the presidency of Donald Trump, the White House website announced that Obama's Climate Action Plan would be eliminated, stating it is "harmful and unnecessary". In March 2017, Trump signed an executive order to officially nullify Obama's Clean Power Plan in an effort, it said, of reviving the coal industry. In January 2021, on the Inauguration Day of U.S. president Joe Biden, Trump's executive order was revoked by the executive order "Protecting Public Health and the Environment and Restoring Science to Tackle the Climate Crisis", thereby reinstating the Obama Climate Action Plan.

== See also ==
- Climate Action Plan
- Climate change in the United States
- National Climate Assessment
- National Research Council, report on climate change
- State of the Climate
