= Kirstin Dow =

Social environmental geographer

- Born: July 11, 1963 (age 63)
- Scientific career
- Fields: Climate change, integrated sciences
- Workplaces: University of South Carolina

Kirstin Dow is a Carolina Trustees Professor of Geography at the University of South Carolina and the Lead Investigator of the Carolinas Integrated Sciences and Assessments (CISA). She is also a co-author of The Atlas of Climate Change which has been published in ten languages and a science advisor on climate change alleviation and adaptation for local and national efforts such as the Intergovernmental Panel on Climate Change and the National Oceanic and Atmospheric Administration.

== Research and work with CISA ==
Dow is a social environmental geographer whose work focuses on the impact of climate change and climate adaptations. At CISA, she works to collaborate with local stakeholders to inform decision making about climate change in the Carolinas. Past projects include developing a Dynamic Drought Index Tool, a web-based tool to determine and map drought indices and conducting studies to support the Third National Climate Assessment. Through CISA she has also worked to host Carolinas Climate Resilience Conferences which bring together hundreds of community members to support climate resilience efforts.

== Awards and honors ==
- Breakthrough Leadership in Research Award, University of South Carolina, 2016
- Public Engagement Fellow, AAAS Leshner Leadership Institute, 2015
- Environmental Stewardship Award, School of the Environment, University of South Carolina, 2011
