= Great Lakes Integrated Sciences and Assessments =

Academic-scientific collaboration

The Great Lakes Integrated Sciences and Assessments Center (GLISA) is a collaboration of the University of Michigan and Michigan State University funded by the National Oceanic and Atmospheric Administration (NOAA). GLISA (pronounced Glee-suh) is part of a national network of NOAA Regional Integrated Sciences and Assessments (RISA) centers that focus on adaptation to climate change and variability. GLISA is the NOAA RISA for the Great Lakes region.

== Function and Goals ==
GLISA integrates information from several scientific fields, develops collaborations between entities with similar goals, and informs decision makers throughout the region with scientific information. GLISA's goals are to build climate literacy, encourage long-term sustainability, and facilitate smart decision making throughout the Great Lakes region.

== Role in the National Climate Assessment ==
At the request of the U.S. Global Change Research Program, GLISA formed a Midwest regional team to provide a technical input report to the National Climate Assessment. A series of peer-reviewed documents comprised the chapters of the report, each focusing on the potential impacts, vulnerabilities, and adaptation options to climate variability and change in a different sector. The chapters were subject to review by at least two external reviewers and revised to reflect reviewer comments.
