= Philip Cooney =

American lobbyist

Philip A. Cooney (born July 16, 1959) is a former member of the administration of United States President George W. Bush. Before being appointed to work in the Council on Environmental Quality, he was a lawyer and lobbyist for the American Petroleum Institute. He was accused of doctoring and changing scientific reports about global warming by other agencies. He then resigned his position and denied any wrongdoing.

== Career ==
=== American Petroleum Institute ===
Prior to working for the Bush administration, Cooney was a lawyer and lobbyist for the American Petroleum Institute (API), an industry group representing the American petroleum industry.

=== Bush administration ===
Cooney joined the George W. Bush administration when he was appointed chief of staff of the Council on Environmental Quality. On June 10, 2005, Cooney announced his resignation, two days after the story of his tampering with scientific reports broke. It was reported that he had altered government climate reports to downplay scientific consensus about climate change. A few days later, it was announced that Cooney would go to work for the petroleum (oil) company ExxonMobil starting in the fall; ExxonMobil declined to describe the nature of Cooney's new job.

=== Government climate reports ===
In early 2005, Rick S. Piltz resigned from his position as a senior associate in the U.S. Climate Change Science Program, saying that Cooney had been editing government climate reports to emphasize doubts about global warming. According to Piltz's resignation letter, Cooney edited documents to "create an enhanced sense of scientific uncertainty about climate change and its implications."

On June 3, 2002, Myron Ebell wrote a memo to Cooney that was obtained by Greenpeace through an FOI request in 2003, explaining how they were going to deal with the publication of the Climate Action Report 2002 by attacking United States Environmental Protection Agency chair Christine Todd Whitman, adding that he was helping to "drive a wedge between the President and those in the Administration who think they are serving the president's best interests by publishing this rubbish."

On August 11, 2003, Maine Attorney General G. Steven Rowe and Connecticut Attorney General Richard Blumenthal in a press release called on United States Attorney General John Ashcroft

to investigate whether officials at the White House Council on Environmental Quality (CEQ) solicited a conservative Washington think tank to sue the federal government in order to invalidate a government document warning of the impacts of global warming.

The two state attorneys general obtained an email document through a Freedom of Information Act request that revealed a great intimacy between CEQ and the Competitive Enterprise Institute (CEI) on strategizing about ways to undermine the United States' official reports and the authority of its officials.

[...] It appears that certain White House officials conspired with an anti-environmental special interest group to cause the lawsuit to be filed against the federal government.

On September 24, 2003, Senator Joseph Lieberman sent a formal letter to the White House asking for details of these ties, and the nature of the help Cooney had received. He also inquired about the lawsuit the Competitive Enterprise Institute (CEI) had filed on August 6, 2003, against the administration under the little-used Data Quality Act to invalidate the National Assessment of the Potential Consequences of Climate Variability and Change, which formed the basis for many of the conclusions in the Climate Action Report. Lieberman charged that the suit was apparently an attempt to have the National Assessment (and therefore the Climate Action Report) withdrawn.

On June 8, 2005, The New York Times said that it had obtained internal White House documents which proved that Cooney had unilaterally edited the national climate change reports during 2002 and 2003 to water down its conclusions. As the article states,

In a section on the need for research into how warming might change water availability and flooding, he crossed out a paragraph describing the projected reduction of mountain glaciers and snowpack. His note in the margins explained that this was "straying from research strategy into speculative findings/musings."

Cooney and his role in editing climate change reports were referenced in the documentaries: An Inconvenient Truth, The 11th Hour and Everything's Cool.

During a March 2007 congressional hearing, Cooney conceded his role in altering reports to downplay the adverse effects of man-made emissions on Earth's climate. "My sole loyalty was to the President and advancing the policies of his administration," he told the United States House Committee on Oversight and Government Reform.
