= Myron Ebell =

American climate change denier

- Born: 1952 or 1953 (age 72–73); Baker County, Oregon, U.S.
- Education: Colorado College (BA); London School of Economics (MSc)
- Known for: Climate change denial; environmental policy; public relations
- Political party: Republican

Myron Ebell is an American climate change denier who served as the Director of Global Warming and International Environmental Policy at the Competitive Enterprise Institute (CEI), an American libertarian advocacy group based in Washington, D.C. He was also chairman of the Cooler Heads Coalition, a politically conservative group formed in 1997 focused on "dispelling the myths of global warming by exposing flawed economic, scientific, and risk analysis". In September 2016, Ebell was appointed by then Republican presidential candidate Donald Trump to lead his transition team for the United States Environmental Protection Agency (EPA).

In these organizations, Ebell has been central in promoting climate change denial, distributing his views to the media and politicians. Ebell, who is not a scientist, has been described as a climate change skeptic, a climate contrarian and a climate change denier. Ebell claims that he advocates "for sensible energy policies that benefit everyone. Instead of policies that simply reacts [sic] to alarmism."

Ebell retired from CEI in 2024.

== Education and early career ==
Ebell grew up on a 2,000 acres (810 ha) cattle ranch at Baker City, Oregon, which was first homesteaded by the Ebells in the 1860s, and is still held by his relatives. In 1971 he went to Colorado College, where he majored in philosophy and then obtained a master's degree in political theory from the London School of Economics. Ebell undertook further postgraduate research at the University of California at San Diego and at Cambridge University before returning to the United States where he worked in a succession of public-policy jobs in Washington.

Around 1988 he bought a house in Prince George's County, Maryland. He worked as assistant to the chairman of the National Taxpayers Union, and by 1990 he was a lobbyist representing the National Inholders Association, campaigning against federal policies which restricted property owners in U.S. national parks and national forests. He worked for this organisation, which was renamed the American Land Rights Association (ALRA), on such policy topics as tobacco regulation and endangered species. In 1995 he sent a nine-page memo to staff at the United States House Committee on Natural Resources opposing Newt Gingrich's proposals to reform the Endangered Species Act (ESA). Ebell wrote that Gingrich's "soft feelings for cuddly little critters is still going to be a big problem", and "We are going to need to get some of the freshmen and women to work on him." Ebell became a senior legislative assistant to Republican Representative John Shadegg and advocated the elimination of federal conservation regulations, leaving protection of the environment in the hands of state and local officials.

In December 1995, he was hired as policy director of Senator Malcolm Wallop's recently founded Frontiers of Freedom Institute. Wallop described Ebell as having "a broad background in public policy with a concentration on land use, environmental and tax policy. He is widely considered the key staff member responsible for and author of the "Shandegg" bill reform of the ESA." Frontiers of Freedom promoted property rights and criticized environmental regulations such as the Endangered Species Act.

== Political views ==
=== Tobacco industry ===
In the 1990s, while serving as Policy Director at the Frontiers of Freedom Institute, Ebell worked as part of a team to make regulating the tobacco industry "politically unpalatable". In 2011, as part of its "Control Abuse of Power" (CAP) project, the CEI launched lawsuits challenging the constitutionality of the 1998 tobacco Master Settlement Agreement (MSA).

=== Global warming ===
At a meeting on April 3, 1998, Ebell was one of 12 public relations experts and think-tank representatives who produced what they called their "Global Climate Science Communications" plan, with the aim of persuading "a majority of the American public" that "significant uncertainties exist in climate science", intending to convince the public and policymakers that the science was faulty and could be ignored. ExxonMobil, the coal utility Southern Company and the American Petroleum Institute were represented at the meeting, and there were proposals for industry funding. Ebell has been referred to as a "public-policy wonk—not, he hastens to clarify, a lobbyist for the energy industry, as many of his fellow skeptics are, or a scientist whose research is underwritten by the energy industry, or a politician who takes contributions from the energy industry."

After this meeting, ExxonMobil, even though aware as early as 1981 that fossil fuels affected climate change, began funding Frontiers of Freedom, where Ebell was a staff member. In 1999 Ebell transferred to the Competitive Enterprise Institute (CEI), and from 1998 to 2005 ExxonMobil provided CEI with over $2 million of funding. On October 27, 2006, Democratic senator Jay Rockefeller and Republican senator Olympia Snowe sent a joint bipartisan letter to Rex Tillerson, the new CEO of ExxonMobil, about its funding of various groups, stating "We fervently hope that reports that ExxonMobil intends to end its funding of the climate change denial campaign of the Competitive Enterprise Institute are true." In 2007, Ebell said funding had no relevance as "We're not beholden to our donors, because we don't say, 'If you give us this money, we'll do this project'," and said "I can't even quite tell you who supports us on global warming". At that time, CEI had funding from the American Petroleum Institute, the Dow Chemical Company, Eli Lilly and Company, and William A. Dunn of Dunn Capital Management. During an August 2015 discussion on C-SPAN, Ebell did not dispute the statement by Jeremy Symons of the Environmental Defense Fund (EDF) that CEI received funds from the Murray Energy Corporation coal mining group. Ebell responded that his group's total budget of about $6 million was far smaller than that of EDF.

Ebell has falsely claimed that "the rate of warming according to the data is much slower than the models used by the IPCC." Climate scientists note that past climate models have accurately predicted subsequent rates of global warming.

==== The Clean Power Plan ====
Ebell has opposed the Clean Power Plan developed by the Environmental Protection Agency. The plan entailed far-reaching regulations that seek to reduce carbon emissions from electricity generation especially by coal-burning power plants. The plan has been tied up in legal proceedings since it was finalized in 2015; Ebell argues that the plan is harmful to the economy and illegal.

==== Paris Agreement ====
In September 2016, the Washington Times quoted Ebell as saying "Congress should prohibit any funding for the Paris Climate Agreement, the Green Climate Fund, and the underlying UN Framework Convention on Climate Change."

==== Environmental Protection Agency and George W. Bush ====
The first National Climate Assessment was prepared over several years. ExxonMobil did not participate in public consultations, but on August 10, 2000, ran an advertisement in the Washington Post raising various objections to a draft. The report was delivered to Congress in November 2000. The incoming George W. Bush administration appointed moderate Republican Christine Todd Whitman as chair of the Environmental Protection Agency (EPA), and American Petroleum Institute lobbyist Philip Cooney as chief of staff of the Council on Environmental Quality (CEQ). During the campaign, Bush had promised to cap carbon dioxide emissions. Shortly after the inauguration Ebell heard a rumor that Bush was going to repeat the pledge in a speech. Ebell contacted Robert Novak who was due to interview Whitman, and Novak questioned her on CNN's Crossfire. It became a hot topic, and CEI circulated it to anyone with influence. Bush dropped the pledge, and in March withdrew from the Kyoto Protocol.

In line with the "Global Climate Science Communications" plan to manufacture uncertainty, Cooney edited the EPA's 2002 US Climate Action Report before sending it to the UN in May, but on June 3, 2002, the New York Times headlined its story "U.S. Sees Problems In Climate Change", saying in a "stark shift" the administration "for the first time mostly blames human actions for recent global warming". That same day, Cooney contacted Ebell, who emailed back "I know you're in crisis mode", and advised "what we can do is limited until there is an official statement from the administration repudiating the report". On June 4 Bush dismissed the report as something "put out by the bureaucracy", and said policy was unchanged. Ebell had said in his email that "the folks at EPA are the obvious fall guys", to be tackled "high up as possible". He had already given several interviews "blaming EPA for freelancing", and "Perhaps tomorrow we will call for Whitman to be fired." She eventually resigned the EPA chair in May 2003.

The recently introduced Data Quality Act had already been used by industry to suppress scientific information, and on August 6, 2003, the CEI sued the Bush administration's Office of Science and Technology Policy under the Act, demanding that it should invalidate the National Assessment as allegedly inaccurate, biased and not based on "sound science", and should also invalidate the Climate Action Report which was based on the Assessment. The attorneys general of Maine and Connecticut obtained documents including Ebell's June 2002 email through a Freedom of Information Act request. On August 11, they asked the U.S. Justice Department under John Ashcroft to investigate – Connecticut Attorney General Richard Blumenthal said the email "indicates a secret initiative by the administration to invite and orchestrate a lawsuit against itself to discredit an official United States government report on global warming dangers", which could be improper and possibly illegal; G. Steven Rowe as attorney general of Maine said "The idea that the Bush administration may have invited a lawsuit from a special interest group in order to undermine the federal government's own work under an international treaty is very troubling." On 24 August, Senator Joe Lieberman wrote to the White House expressing hope that the lawsuit was "not the result of a collusive plan conceived by the CEI in concert with the Administration, itself. It would be wrong in any circumstances to reject the well founded findings of the [Climate Action Report], but for the Administration to use an outside group to pursue such an ill-conceived goal would be doubly wrong, and could also be abuse of the courts at the expense of the taxpayers." Ashcroft turned down the request for an investigation. On November 4, 2003, the CEI's lawsuit was dismissed by the court, with prejudice so that it could not be re-filed.

==== Media coverage ====
Ebell has been given extensive media coverage, frequently cited or interviewed by journalists in a way that presents a false balance by giving Ebell's lay views equal weight with those of expert climatologists, and thus misrepresents the consensus of scientific opinion on climate change. A study of false equivalence in the media used as an example the Scripps Howard media company "incredibly" giving equal space to Ebell's comments that reports of recent warming from the World Meteorological Organisation and the National Climatic Data Center were unsurprising because of the Little Ice Age, so "it isn’t much to worry about", and of a Science paper by Thomas R. Karl and Kevin Trenberth that "the Karl-Trenberth analysis is nothing new—it's just kind of a summary of what the establishment thinks is true".

In an interview on BBC Radio 4 in 2005, Ebell said that the UK's Chief Scientist David King was "an alarmist with ridiculous views who knows nothing about climate change". An early day motion deploring "in the strongest possible terms" Ebell's "unfounded and insulting criticism" was raised in the House of Commons of the United Kingdom, and was signed by 66 Members of Parliament.

In 2006, CEI arranged a public-service television commercial about carbon dioxide with the slogan "They call it pollution; we call it life." Also in 2006, Ebell wrote an article in Forbes titled "Love Global Warming". In the article, Ebell wrote, "More people die from blizzards and cold spells than from heat waves. Increased death rates usually persist for weeks after the unusually cold temperatures have passed, which suggests that the cold is killing people who would otherwise live into another season at least. Mortality rates during heat waves are just the reverse. The increase ends and often the rate drops below normal as soon as temperatures cool, which suggests that the higher temperatures are killing people who are likely to die soon anyway."

In a 2007 discussion with Michael Shnayerson, Ebell criticized James Hansen's writings on the effects of climate change on animals by saying "James Hansen was not trained as a climate scientist", instead "He was trained as an astronomer. He's a physicist" and "you know from him talking about species' going north, he knows nothing about biology." Ebell similarly argued that Robert Corell "is not a climate scientist" and "not an Arctic expert"; Corell told Shnayerson that his Arctic research visits began in 1968. Ebell has no scientific training, and told Shnayerson that, when asked about scientific topics in interviews, he would say "I'm not a climate scientist. I'm just giving you the informed layman's perspective". His view is that "If science is going to be discussed in the public arena, then shouldn't people other than scientists be allowed to participate? Isn't that what a representative democracy is?"

Through CEI, Ebell has stated his belief that global warming is a hoax, that most of the data predicting climate change is false, and that the scientific consensus was "phony".

In 2009 a Climatic Research Unit computer server at the University of East Anglia was hacked and thousands of emails and computer files were uploaded to a Russian server. Ebell said the hacked emails "make it clear that the U.N. Intergovernmental Panel on Climate Change is an organized conspiracy dedicated to tricking the world into believing that global warming is a crisis that requires a drastic response."

=== Environmentalists ===
Ebell has stated that environmentalists believe "humans are evil, the use of human power is always bad; everything we do to nature is bad." Ebell views forced energy conservation as an infringement on American rights; he has stated: "Energy is fundamental to mobility, to comfort. When you start limiting people's access to energy, you limit their ability to live the way they want, to make choices."

Ebell compared his efforts and those of his colleagues to a "David versus Goliath struggle" against "corrupt environmentalism and big government", and has said that the "environmental movement is not an objective, well-intentioned movement that cares about saving the planet", but one which emerged from the New Left, and which always proposes the same solutions regardless of the issue: lower material standards of living, more government control, and more power for the technocratic elite.

=== The Endangered Species Act ===
In opposing a 2005 update, Ebell said that the Endangered Species Act unfairly infringes on land owners' property rights, as well as undermining the protection of rare species by encouraging land owners to make their property inhospitable to such species in order to escape regulation. Ebell stated in an interview that the CEI is "adamantly opposed" to the Endangered Species Act, and that they are working on it in a limited way now because they could not attract funding.

== Trump Environmental Protection Agency transition team ==
In September 2016, Ebell was appointed by then Republican presidential candidate Donald Trump to lead his transition team for the United States Environmental Protection Agency (EPA). As of January 27, 2017, he was described as the former head of the transition team.

== Personal life ==
Ebell resides in a suburb of Washington, D.C., with his wife and four children.

In August 2023, Ebell announced that he would retire from CEI, effective in January 2024. He cited his age, declining energy and alleged side effects from COVID-19 vaccines.
