= Brenda Ekwurzel =

American climate scientist

- Born: 1963
- Education: Smith College
- Scientific career
- Thesis: Circulation and mean residence times in the Arctic Ocean derived from tritium, helium, and oxygen-18 tracers (1998)

Brenda Ekwurzel (born 1963) is an American climate scientist. She is director of climate science for the Union of Concerned Scientists. She is an American Association for the Advancement of Science fellow.

== Biography ==
Ekwurzel received a B.S. in geology from Smith College in 1985. In 1998 she received an M.S. from Rutgers University where she worked on the movement of sediment. She went on to earn a Ph.D. from Columbia University / Lamont–Doherty Earth Observatory(1988) where she tracked water masses in the Arctic. Following her Ph.D. she was a postdoctoral researcher at Lawrence Livermore National Laboratory. She then moved to the University of Arizona.

In 2019, she was a keynote speaker at the Weber State University Sustainability Summit.

She testified before the United States Congress about climate change in 2019. She has spoken about the National Climate Assessment with the media.

== Selected publications ==
- Ekwurzel, B.; Boneham, J.; Dalton, M. W.; Heede, R.; Mera, R. J.; Allen, M. R.; Frumhoff, P. C. (2017). "The rise in global atmospheric CO2, surface temperature, and sea level from emissions traced to major carbon producers". Climatic Change. 144 (4): 579–590. doi:10.1007/s10584-017-1978-0. ISSN 0165-0009. S2CID 108287513.
- Ekwurzel, Brenda; Schlosser, Peter; Mortlock, Richard A.; Fairbanks, Richard G.; Swift, James H. (2001-05-15). "River runoff, sea ice meltwater, and Pacific water distribution and mean residence times in the Arctic Ocean". Journal of Geophysical Research: Oceans. 106 (C5): 9075–9092. doi:10.1029/1999JC000024.
- Ekwurzel, Brenda; Schlosser, Peter; Smethie, William M.; Plummer, L. Niel; Busenberg, Eurybiades; Michel, Robert L.; Weppernig, Ralf; Stute, Martin (1994). "Dating of shallow groundwater: Comparison of the transient tracers 3 H/ 3 He, chlorofluorocarbons, and 85 Kr". Water Resources Research. 30 (6): 1693–1708. doi:10.1029/94WR00156.
- Moore, Keara B.; Ekwurzel, Brenda; Esser, Bradley K.; Hudson, G. Bryant; Moran, Jean E. (2006-06-01). "Sources of groundwater nitrate revealed using residence time and isotope methods". Applied Geochemistry. 21 (6): 1016–1029. doi:10.1016/j.apgeochem.2006.03.008. ISSN 0883-2927.

== Awards and honors ==
In 2016 she was elected a fellow of the American Association for the Advancement of Science.
