= Michelle Patron =

White house staff member

Michelle Naomi (Billig) Patron (born 1974) is an energy policy expert who currently serves as the director of sustainability policy at Microsoft. From 2013 to 2015, she served in the White House as Special Assistant to the President and Senior Director for energy and climate change on the U.S. National Security Staff.

Patron received her bachelor's degree from Columbia University in 1996 and her master's degree in international studies from Johns Hopkins University in 1999.

From 1999 to 2003, Patron was an international policy advisor at the U.S. Department of Energy, advising on relations with major energy producing and consuming countries and designing strategies to address climate change, energy security, and market reform. During 2001, she served as Energy Attache at the U.S. Embassy in Beijing.

Patron was an International Affairs Fellow at the Council on Foreign Relations in 2003-2004 and conducted energy research at Deutsche Bank in New York. She also worked at the International Energy Agency and the Center for International Environmental Law.

In 2004, Patron moved to PIRA Energy Group, an energy consulting firm in New York, where she was senior director, managing a research service that tracked global political and regulatory developments and assessing their impact on energy markets. She was at the same time an adjunct professor at New York University's Center for Global Affairs.

Patron is a member of the Council on Foreign Relations and has written for Foreign Affairs, Financial Times, and the Los Angeles Times.

== Personal life ==
Patron is the daughter of Judi Billig and Bob Billig of North Miami Beach, Florida. She was married on November 15, 2008, to David I. Patron, at the time an executive with American Express.
