= Climate Change Science Program =

US Climate Change organization

The Climate Change Science Program (CCSP) was the program responsible for coordinating and integrating research on global warming by U.S. government agencies from February 2002 to June 2009. Toward the end of that period, CCSP issued 21 separate climate assessment reports that addressed climate observations, changes in the atmosphere, expected climate change, impacts and adaptation, and risk management issues. Shortly after President Obama took office, the program's name was changed to U.S. Global Change Research Program (USGCRP) which was also the program's name before 2002. Nevertheless, the Obama Administration generally embraced the CCSP products as sound science providing a basis for climate policy. Because those reports were mostly issued after the Fourth Assessment Report of the Intergovernmental Panel on Climate Change (IPCC), and in some cases focused specifically on the United States, they were generally viewed within the United States as having an importance and scientific credibility comparable to the IPCC assessments for the first few years of the Obama Administration.

== The products ==
The primary outputs from the CCSP were its strategic plan and 21 Synthesis and Assessment Products (SAP), five of which were released on January 16, 2009, the last business day of the Bush Administration. The CCSP Strategic Plan of 2003 defined five goals:

1. Extend knowledge of the Earth's past and present climate and environment, including its natural variability, and improve understanding of the causes of observed changes (see Observations and causes of climate change),
2. Improve understanding of the forces bringing about changes in the Earth's climate and related systems (see Changes in the atmosphere)
3. Reduce uncertainty in projections of how the Earth's climate and environmental systems may change in the future (see Climate projections)
4. Understand the sensitivity and adaptability of different natural and managed systems to climate and associated global changes (see Impacts and adaptation)
5. Explore the uses and identify the limits of evolving knowledge to manage risks and opportunities related to climate variability and change (see Using information to manage risks)

The plan also proposed 21 SAP's, each of which were designed to support one of these five goals. The plan was updated in 2008. The following sections discuss the SAP's, grouped according to the five topic areas.

=== Observations and causes of climate change ===
Three SAP's evaluated observations of climate change and our ability to definitively attribute the causes of these changes.

==== Temperature trends in the lower atmosphere (SAP 1.1) ====
NOAA released the first of 21 CCSP Synthesis and Assessment reports in May 2006, entitled Temperature Trends in the Lower Atmosphere: Steps for Understanding and Reconciling Differences. The report identified and corrected errors in satellite temperature measurements and other temperature observations, which increased scientific confidence in the conclusion that lower atmosphere is warming on a global scale: "There is no longer a discrepancy in the rate of global average temperature increase for the surface compared with higher levels in the atmosphere," said the report, "the observed patterns of change over the past 50 years cannot be explained by natural processes alone". The report also said that "all current atmospheric data sets now show global-average warming that is similar to the surface warming. While these data are consistent with the results from climate models at the global scale, discrepancies in the tropics remain to be resolved."

==== The Arctic and other high latitude areas (SAP 1.2) ====
On January 16, 2009 (the last business day of the Bush Administration), USGS released Past Climate Variability and Change in the Arctic and at High Latitudes. According to the USGS press release, the report shows that:

- The Arctic has recently been warming about as rapidly as it has ever warned throughout the entire record of past Arctic climate.
- The loss of sea ice during summers over the last few decades is highly unusual compared to the last few thousand years. Changes in Earth's orbit alone would have increased summer sea ice.
- Sustained warming of at least 2 to 7 °C would be likely to eventually melt the entire Greenland ice sheet, which would raise sea level by several meters.
- The past tells us that when thresholds in the climate system are crossed, climate change can be very large and very fast. No one knows whether human activities will trigger such events in the coming decades and centuries.

==== Attribution of the causes of observed climate change (SAP 1.3) ====
NOAA released Re-Analyses of Historical Climate Data for Key Atmospheric Features: Implications for attribution of causes of observed change in December 2008. According to the report, from 1951 to 2006 the yearly average temperature for North America increased by 1.6°Fahrenheit, with virtually all of the warmingsince 1970. During this period, the average temperature has warmed approximately 3.6 °F over Alaska, the Yukon Territories, Alberta, and Saskatchewan, but no significant warming occurred in the southern United States or eastern Canada. More than half of the warming of North America is likely (more than 66 percent chance) to have resulted from human activity.

There is less evidence that precipitation is changing. The report found no significant trend in North American precipitation since 1951, although there have been substantial changes from year to year and even decade to decade. Moreover, it is unlikely that a fundamental change has occurred in either how often or where severe droughts have occurred over the continental United States during the past half-century. Nevertheless, drought impacts have likely become more severe in recent decades. It is likely that the impacts have been more severe because the recent droughts have lasted a few years, and because warmer temperatures have created stresses in plants, which make them more vulnerable.

=== Changes in the atmosphere ===
==== Scenarios of greenhouse gas emissions and atmospheric concentrations (SAP 2.1) ====
The US Department of Energy released the second SAP in July 2007, entitled Scenarios of Greenhouse Gas Emissions and Atmospheric Concentrations and Review of Integrated Scenario Development and Application. This two-volume report explored emission scenarios that could stabilize the net effect of greenhouse gases at four different levels. It also outlined key principles and approaches for developing global change scenarios. The two reports were each written by a subset of the members of the Climate Change Science Program Product Development Advisory Committee, a panel organized under the Federal Advisory Committee Act.

The report's executive summary stated that the emission reductions necessary to stabilize radiative climate forcing would "require a transformation of the global energy system, including reductions in the demand for energy... and changes in the mix of energy technologies and fuels." But the authors found great uncertainty in the price that would be necessary to stabilize climate forcing—as well as the resulting economic cost: " These differences are illustrative of some of the unavoidable uncertainties in long-term scenarios."

==== Other synthesis and assessment products ====
In addition to SAP 2.1, CCSP produced three other reports to further the goal of improving quantification of climate forcing:

- NOAA released "North American Carbon Budget and Implications for the Global Carbon Cycle" (SAP 2.2) in November 2007.
- NASA released "Atmospheric Aerosol Properties and Climate Impacts" (SAP 2.3) on January 16, 2009.
- NOAA released "Trends in Emissions of Ozone-Depleting Substances, Ozone Layer Recovery, and Implications for Ultraviolet Radiation Exposure" (SAP 2.4) in November 2008.

=== Climate projections ===
As provided in the CCSP strategic plan, four SAP's examined issues under CCSP's Goal 3:

- DOE released "Climate Models: An Assessment of Strengths and Limitations." (SAP 3.1) in July 2008.
- NOAA released "Climate Projections Based on Emissions Scenarios for Long-Lived and Short-Lived Radiatively Active Gases and Aerosols." (SAP 3.2) in September 2008.
- NOAA released "Weather and Climate Extremes in a Changing Climate Regions of Focus: North America, Hawaii, Caribbean, and U.S. Pacific Islands." (SAP 3.3) in June 2008.
- USGS released "Abrupt Climate Change." (SAP 3.4) in December 2008.

=== Impacts and adaptation ===
Seven SAP's examined the effects of climate change, impacts on people and natural systems, and opportunities and capacity to adapt. Those assessments provided the backbone to the Congressionally mandated Global Climate Change Impacts in the United States which was released in June 2009.

==== Coastal sensitivity to sea level rise (SAP 4.1) ====
The U.S. Environmental Protection Agency released Coastal Sensitivity to Sea-Level Rise: A Focus on the Mid-Atlantic Region (SAP 4.1) on January 16, 2009. According to the report's abstract, rising sea level can inundate low areas and increase flooding, coastal erosion, wetland loss, and saltwater intrusion into estuaries and freshwater aquifers. Much of the United States consists of coastal environments and landforms such as barrier islands and wetlands that will respond to sea-level rise by changing shape, size, or position. The combined effects of sea-level rise and other climate change factors such as storms may cause rapid and irreversible coastal change. Coastal communities and property owners have responded to coastal hazards by erecting shore protection structures, elevating land and buildings, or relocating inland. Accelerated sea-level rise would increase the costs and environmental impacts of these responses.

Preparing for sea-level rise can be justified in many cases, because the cost of preparing now is small compared to the cost of reacting later. Examples include wetland protection, flood insurance, long-lived infrastructure, and coastal land-use planning. Nevertheless, preparing for sea-level rise has been the exception rather than the rule. Most coastal institutions were based on the implicit assumption that sea level and shorelines are stable. Efforts to plan for sea-level rise can be thwarted by several institutional biases, including government policies that encourage coastal development, flood insurance maps that do not consider sea-level rise, federal policies that prefer shoreline armoring over soft shore protection, and lack of plans delineating which areas would be protected or not as sea level rises.

A committee set up under the Federal Advisory Committee Act monitored the progress of SAP 4.1, and questioned several aspects of the final report. The original plan included maps and estimates of wetland loss from a then-ongoing EPA mapping study conducted by James G. Titus, who was also a lead author of SAP 4.1. Early drafts included the maps and results, but the final draft did not. Experts and environmental organizations objected to the deletions. The federal advisory committee also took issue with the maps' removal from SAP 4.1 and recommended that EPA publish the mapping study. EPA later confirmed that EPA management had altered the report and suppressed the mapping study, although it declined to explain why.

==== Thresholds in ecosystems (SAP 4.2) ====
USGS released Thresholds of Climate Change in Ecosystems (SAP 4.2) on January 16, 2009.

A key premise of the report was that an ecological threshold is the point at which there is an abrupt change in an ecosystem that produces large, persistent and potentially irreversible changes. The report concluded that slight changes in climate may trigger major abrupt ecosystem responses that are not easily reversible. Some of these responses, including insect outbreaks, wildfire, and forest dieback, may adversely affect people as well as ecosystems and their plants and animals. One of the greatest concerns is that once an ecological threshold is crossed, the ecosystem in question will most likely not return to its previous state. The report also emphasized that human actions may increase an ecosystem's potential for crossing ecological thresholds. For example, additional human use of water in a watershed experiencing drought could trigger basic changes in aquatic life that may not be reversible. Ecosystems that already face stressors other than climate change, will almost certainly reach their threshold for abrupt change sooner.

==== Effects on agriculture, land resources, water resources, and biodiversity (SAP 4.3) ====
The United States Department of Agriculture released The Effects of Climate Change on Agriculture, Land Resources, Water Resources, and Biodiversity (SAP 4.3) in May 2008. The executive summary includes the following findings.

Agriculture

- Life cycle of grain and oilseed crops will likely progress more rapidly; but with rising temperatures and variable rainfall, crops will begin to experience failure, especially if precipitation lessens or becomes more variable.
- Climate change is leading to a northward migration of cropland weeds, and range and pasture plant species, which affects crops, grazing land, and livestock operations.
- Higher temperatures will very likely reduce livestock production during the summer season.

Land resources

- Climate change has likely increased the size and number of forest fires, insect outbreaks and tree mortality in the Interior West (Colorado, the Great Basin), Southwest and Alaska
- In arid lands, changes in temperature and precipitation will very likely decrease the vegetation cover that protects the ground surface from wind and erosion.
- Rising CO_{2} will very likely increase photosynthesis for forests, but this increase will likely only enhance wood production in young forests on fertile soils.

Water resources

- Runoff may increase in eastern regions, gradually transitioning to little change in the Missouri and lower Mississippi, to substantial decreases in the interior of the west (Colorado and Great Basin).
- Stream temperatures are likely to increase, which will harm aquatic ecosystems.
- Mountain snowpack is declining and melting earlier in the spring across much of the western United States.

Biodiversity

- The rapid rate of warming in the Arctic is dramatically reducing snow and ice cover that provide denning and forage habitat for polar bears.
- Corals in many tropical regions are experiencing substantial mortality from increasing water temperatures, increasing storm intensity, and a reduction in pH.

==== Adaptation options for climate-sensitive ecosystems and resources (SAP 4.4) ====
EPA released Preliminary Review of Adaptation Options for Climate-Sensitive Ecosystems and Resources (SAP 4.3) in May 2008. The study focuses on national parks, national forests, national wildlife refuges, wild and scenic rivers, national estuaries, and marine protected areas, all of which are protected by the federal government. The report analyzed how to meet existing management goals set for each protected area to understand what strategies will increase the resilience of each ecosystem.

EPA concluded that climate change can increase the impact of traditional stressors (such as pollution or habitat destruction) on ecosystems, and that many existing best management practices to reduce these stressors can also be applied to reduce the impacts of climate change. For example, current efforts to reverse habitat destruction by restoring vegetation along streams also increase ecosystem resilience to climate change impacts, such as greater amounts of pollutants and sediments from more intense rainfall. EPA also concluded that the nation's ability to adapt to climate change will depend on a variety of factors including recognizing the barriers to implementing new strategies, expanding collaboration among ecosystem managers, creatively re-examining program goals and authorities, and being flexible in setting priorities and managing for change.

==== Effects of Climate Change on Energy Production and Use (SAP 4.5) ====
DOE released Effects of Climate Change on Energy Production and Use in the United States (SAP 4.5) in October 2007. The report concludes that the possible impacts of climate change on energy production are important enough to start considering how to adapt. The report's executive summary summarized the report with three questions and answers:

- How might climate change affect energy consumption in the United States? The research evidence is relatively clear that climate warming will mean reductions in total U.S. heating requirements and increases in total cooling requirements for buildings. These changes will vary by region and by season, but they will affect household and business energy costs and their demands on energy supply institutions. In general, the changes imply increased demands for electricity, which supplies virtually all cooling energy services but only some heating services. Other effects on energy consumption are less clear.
- How might climate change affect energy production and supply in the United States? The research evidence about effects is not as strong as for energy consumption, but climate change could affect energy production and supply (a) if extreme weather events become more intense, (b) where regions dependent on water supplies for hydropower and/or thermal power plant cooling face reductions in water supplies, (c) where temperature increases decrease overall thermoelectric power generation efficiencies, and (d) where changed conditions affect facility siting decisions. Most effects are likely to be modest except for possible regional effects of extreme weather events and water shortages.
- How might climate change have other effects that indirectly shape energy production and consumption in the United States? The research evidence about indirect effects ranges from abundant information about possible effects of climate change policies on energy technology choices to extremely limited information about such issues as effects on energy security. Based on this mixed evidence, it appears that climate change is likely to affect risk management in the investment behavior of some energy institutions, and it is very likely to have some effects on energy technology R&D investments and energy resource and technology choices. In addition, climate change can be expected to affect other countries in ways that in turn affect U.S. energy conditions through their participation in global and hemispheric energy markets, and climate change concerns could interact with some driving forces behind policies focused on U.S. energy security.

==== Effects on Human Health and Welfare and Human Systems (SAP 4.6) ====
EPA released Analyses of the Effects of Global Change on Human Health and Welfare and Human Systems. (SAP 4.6) in July 2008. The report was directed by Janet L. Gamble of EPA and written by 28 authors. According to EPA, some of the key conclusions of this report are:

- It is very likely that heat-related illnesses and deaths will increase over coming decades.
- An increase in ozone could cause or exacerbate heart and lung diseases.
- Several food and water-borne diseases are likely to be transmitted among susceptible populations, although climate will seldom be the only factor.
- The very young and old, the poor, those with health problems and disabilities, and certain occupational groups are at greater risk.
- The U.S. is better prepared than most developing countries to respond to public health impacts from climate change.
- The most vulnerable areas in the United States are likely to be in Alaska, coastal and river basins susceptible to flooding, and arid areas where water scarcity is a pressing issue, and areas where economic bases are climate-sensitive.
- Populations are moving toward those areas that are more likely to be vulnerable to the effects of climate change.
- The U.S. has a well-developed public health infrastructure and environmental regulatory program to protect our air and water. If these are maintained, the U.S. can respond to many of the effects of climate change, moderating their impact.

The report was formally reviewed by an independent panel set up in compliance with the Federal Advisory Committee Act. This FACA panel's report gave a generally favorable review while providing many specific areas where improvements were needed. The advisory committee's greatest concern was that the report tried so hard to be evenhanded and not overstate what we know, that it came close to leaving the impression that we know little in cases where a lot is known. EPA revised the report to satisfy those concerns and published a response to each of the comments. While not taking issue with the report's findings, the Government Accountability Project complained that EPA delayed releasing the report three months so that its results could be excluded from a regulatory finding about whether greenhouse gases threaten public health.

==== Impacts on transport and infrastructure (SAP 4.7) ====
The United States Department of Transportation released Impacts of Climate Variability and Change on Transportation Systems and Infrastructure—Gulf Coast Study (SAP 4.7) in March 2008. The report was prepared by Michael Savonis of the Federal Highway Administration, Joanne Potter (a consultant to DOT), and Virginia Burkett of USGS.

The premise of SAP 4.7 was that climate is changing. Sea levels in the Gulf of Mexico are likely to rise by two to four feet over the next 50 to 100 years from the combination of climate-induced warming and land subsidence. Tropical storms are anticipated to increase in intensity and the number of heavy precipitation events is expected to increase, raising prospects of flooding and structural damage. And the number of very hot days (i.e., >90 °F) could rise by 50%.

The report concluded that the expected impacts of these climate effects on transportation are striking. A significant portion of the region's road, rail, and port network is at risk of permanent flooding if sea levels rise by four feet. This includes more than 2,400 miles (27%) of the major roads, 9% of the rail lines, and 72% of the ports. More than half (64% of interstates; 57% of arterials) of the area's major highways, almost half of the rail miles, 29 airports, and virtually all of the ports are subject to temporary flooding and damage due to increased storm intensity. The increase in daily high temperatures could increase wear on asphalt and the potential for rail buckling. Construction costs are likely to increase because of restrictions on workers on days above 90 degrees Fahrenheit.

Transportation planners can employ climate data to draw meaningful conclusions about the future. In fact, the Gulf Coast Study recommends that transportation decision makers in the Gulf Coast should begin immediately to assess climate impacts in the development of transportation investment strategies. The study also found, however, that transportation planners need new methodological tools to address the longer time frames, complexities and uncertainties that are inherent in projections of climate phenomena. Such methods are likely to be based on probability and statistics (i.e., risk assessment techniques) as much as on engineering and material science.

=== Using information to manage risks ===
Three SAP's were prepared to further CCSP's Goal 5

- NASA released "Uses and Limitations of Observations, Data, Forecasts, and Other Projections in Decision Support for Selected Sectors and Regions." (SAP 5.1) in September 2008.
- NOAA released "Best Practice Approaches for Characterizing, Communicating, and Incorporating Scientific Uncertainty in Decisionmaking." (SAP 5.2) on January 16, 2009.
- NOAA released "Decision Support Experiments and Evaluations using Seasonal to Interannual Forecasts and Observational Data." (SAP 5.3) in November 2008.

=== Global Climate Change Impacts in the United States ===
To fulfill a statutory requirement for a national assessment, the CCSP released Scientific Assessment of the Impacts of Global Change in the United States in May 2008. Shortly thereafter, a team of authors synthesized key findings from the SAP's. In June 2009, CCSP changed its name to United States Global Change Research Program and released the unified synthesis report, entitled Global Climate Change Impacts in the United States . The report had ten key findings which became the bedrock of the Obama Administration's view of the impacts of climate change.

1. Global warming is unequivocal and primarily human-induced. Global temperature has increased over the past 50 years. This observed increase is due primarily to human-induced emissions of heat-trapping gases.
2. Climate changes are underway in the United States and are projected to grow. Climate-related changes are already observed in the United States and its coastal waters. These include increases in heavy downpours, rising temperature and sea level, rapidly retreating glaciers, thawing permafrost, lengthening growing seasons, lengthening ice-free seasons in the ocean and on lakes and rivers, earlier snowmelt, and alterations in river flows. These changes are projected to grow.
3. Widespread climate-related impacts are occurring now and are expected to increase. Climate changes are already affecting water, energy, transportation, agriculture, ecosystems, and health. These impacts are different from region to region and will grow under projected climate change.
4. Climate change will stress water resources. Water is an issue in every region, but the nature of the potential impacts varies. Drought, related to reduced precipitation, increased evaporation, and increased water loss from plants, is an important issue in many regions, especially in the West. Floods and water quality problems are likely to be amplified by climate change in most regions. Declines in mountain snowpack are important in the West and Alaska where snowpack provides vital natural water storage.
5. Crop and livestock production will be increasingly challenged. Many crops show positive responses to elevated responses to carbon dioxide. However, increased heat, pests, water stress, diseases, and weather extremes will pose adaptation challenges for crop and livestock production.
6. Coastal areas are at increasing risk from sea-level rise and storm surge. Sea-level rise and storm surge place many U.S. coastal areas at increasing risk of erosion and flooding, especially along the Atlantic and Gulf Coasts, Pacific Islands, and parts of Alaska. Energy and transportation infrastructure and other property in coastal areas are very likely to be adversely affected.
7. Risks to human health will increase. Health impacts of climate change are related to heat stress, waterborne diseases, poor air quality, extreme weather events, and diseases transmitted by insects and rodents. Robust public health infrastructure can reduce the potential for negative impacts.
8. Climate change will interact with many social and environmental stresses. Climate change will combine with pollution, population growth, overuse of resources, urbanization, and other social, economic, and environmental stresses to create larger impacts than from any of these factors alone.
9. Thresholds will be crossed, leading to large changes in climate and ecosystems. There are a variety of thresholds in the climate system and ecosystems. These thresholds determine, for example, the presence of sea ice and permafrost, and the survival of species, from fish to insect pests, with implications for society. With further climate change, the crossing of additional thresholds is expected.
10. Future climate change and its impacts depend on choices made today. The amount and rate of future climate change depend primarily on current and future human-caused emissions of heat-trapping gases and airborne particles. Responses involve reducing emissions to limit future warming, and adapting to the changes that are unavoidable.

== The organization ==
The CCSP was known as US Global Change Research Program until 2002, as authorized by the Global Change Research Act of 1990. The Bush Administration changed its name to Climate Change Science Program as part of its U.S. Climate Change Research Initiative. The Administration envisioned "a nation and the global community empowered with the science-based knowledge to manage the risks and opportunities of change in the climate and related environmental systems". President Bush reestablished priorities for climate change research to focus on scientific information that can be developed within 2 to 5 years to assist evaluation of strategies to address global change risks. One the CCSP's cornerstones was the creation of 21 Synthesis and Assessment Products (SAPs) to provide information to help policymakers and the public make better decisions.

=== Participants ===
The following is a list of participating agencies.

- Agency for International Development
- United States Department of Agriculture
- Department of Commerce: National Oceanic and Atmospheric Administration and National Institute of Standards and Technology
- United States Department of Defense
- United States Department of Energy
- Department of Health and Human Services, National Institutes of Health
- United States Department of State
- Dept. of Transportation
- United States Department of the Interior, U.S. Geological Survey
- U.S. Environmental Protection Agency
- National Aeronautics & Space Administration
- National Science Foundation
- Smithsonian Institution

The CCSP was guided by a committee of senior representatives from each of these departments and agencies, known as the CCSP Principals. The CCSP was also overseen by the Interagency Working Group on Climate Change Science and Technology. (The committee of CCSP Principals was essentially synonymous with the Subcommittee on Global Change Research of the Committee on Environment and Natural Resources under the National Science and Technology Council in the White House Office of Science and Technology Policy.) Specific program activities were coordinated through Interagency Working Groups. A coordination office facilitated the activities of the Principals and IWGs. That office as well as the IWG's continued to operate when the CCSP became the USGCRP.

=== Directors ===
- James R. Mahoney served as the first director of the CCSP and Assistant Secretary of Commerce for Oceans and Atmosphere from April 2002 to March 2006.
- William J. Brennan became Acting Director of CCSP in June 2006. Brennan remained as the acting director until June 2008 when he was confirmed as Assistant Secretary of Commerce for Oceans and Atmosphere and thereby became the director. (Jane C. Luxton of Virginia had been nominated by President Bush in September 2006 for the position, but her nomination was later withdrawn.)
- Jack A. Kaye became Acting Director of CCSP upon Brennan's retirement from NOAA in January 2009.

=== Reviews and criticism ===
The Climate Change Science Program operated during an administration that believed that continued scientific investigation was necessary before policies should be implemented. The CCSP faced the challenge of navigating the narrow path between administration officials who were sceptical of the general scientific consensus about greenhouse gases, and scientific critics who were skeptical about almost everything that the administration did related to climate change. As a result, the CCSP was under more scrutiny than most federal scientific coordination programs.

The National Research Council (NRC) reviewed CCSP several times. The NRC's 2004 review concluded that "the Strategic Plan for the U.S. Climate Change Science Program articulates a guiding vision, is appropriately ambitious, and is broad in scope" and "the CCSP should implement the activities described in the strategic plan with urgency." The NRC also recommended that CCSP should expand its traditional focus on atmospheric sciences to better understand the impacts, adaptation, and the human dimension of climate change. More focus on helping decision makers was necessary, it concluded.

A 2007 NRC review was more critical. "Discovery science and understanding of the climate system are proceeding well, but use of that knowledge to support decision making and to manage risks and opportunities of climate change is proceeding slowly." The NRC was particularly critical of the program's failure to engage stakeholders or advance scientific understanding of the impacts of climate change on human well-being. Looking to the future of the program, a 2008 NRC report put forward a set of research recommendations very similar to that embodied in the CCSP Strategic Plan revision of 2008.

The Climate Change Scientific Program was occasionally criticized for the alleged suppression of scientific information. In March 2005, Rick S. Piltz resigned from CCSP charging political interference with scientific reports: "I believe ...that the administration ... has acted to impede forthright communication of the state of climate science and its implications for society." Piltz charged that the Bush Administration had suppressed the previous National Assessment on Climate Change, by systematically deleting references to the report from government scientific documents. Piltz later complained about political tinkering with the timing of SAP 4.6, and suppression of sea level rise mapping studies associated with SAP 4.1.

== See also ==
- Effects of global warming
- National Assessment on Climate Change
- Land change science
