= Executive Order 14156 =

2025 executive order on energy

- Long title: Declaring a National Energy Emergency

Legislative history
- Signed into law by President Donald Trump on January 20, 2025

Executive Order 14156, titled Declaring a National Energy Emergency is an executive order signed by President Donald Trump on January 20, 2025.

== Provisions ==
The order states that U.S. energy production and infrastructure are insufficient to meet national needs and constitute an "unusual and extraordinary threat" to the country's economy, national security, and foreign policy.

It directs the U.S. Army Corps of Engineers to expedite project reviews using emergency permitting provisions.

In May 2025, a coalition of U.S. states filed a lawsuit challenging the order, alleging that it allowed federal agencies to bypass or shorten environmental review processes required under laws such as the Clean Water Act and the Endangered Species Act.
