= Richard H. Moss =

American climate scientist

- Occupations: Adjunct professor, University of Maryland’s Department of Geographical Sciences
- Board member of: Chairman, Advisory Committee for the Sustained National Climate Assessment

Academic background
- Education: Carleton College; Princeton University, MPA, PhD

Academic work
- Discipline: Climate Scientist
- Main interests: Systems dynamics of integrated human-environment systems

Richard H. Moss is a climate scientist and former chairman of the Advisory Committee for the Sustained National Climate Assessment. In that role, he was responsible to support the publication of the Climate Science Special Report and the Fourth National Climate Assessment.

Moss was previously Vice President and Managing Director for Climate Change at the World Wildlife Fund and Senior Director for Energy and Climate at the United Nations Foundation. Moss has been a member of the IPCC since 1993.

== Selected publications ==
- Calvin KV, B Bond-Lamberty, LE Clarke, JA Edmonds, J Eom, CA Hartin, SH Kim, GP Kyle, RP Link, RH Moss, HC McJeon, PL Patel, SJ Smith, ST Waldhoff, and MA Wise. 2017. "The SSP4: A World of Deepening Inequality." Global Environmental Change 42:284-296. doi:10.1016/j.gloenvcha.2016.06.010
- Moss RH. 2016. "Assessing Decision Support Systems and Levels of Confidence to Narrow the Climate Information "Usability Gap"." Climatic Change 135(1):143-155. doi:10.1007/s10584-015-1549-1
- Buizer JL, K Dow, ME Black, K Jacobs, A Waple, RH Moss, S Moser, A Luers, DI Gustafson, TC Richmond, SL Hays, and CB Field. 2016. "Building a sustained climate assessment process." Climatic Change 135(1):23-37. doi:10.1007/s10584-015-1501-4
- Williamson P and RH Moss. 1993. "Degrees of National Wealth." Nature 362: Art. No.782. DOI:10.1038/362782a0.
