= Global Change Information System =

Information systems and climate change

The U.S. Global Change Research Program (USGCRP) develops and curates the Global Change Information System (GCIS) to establish "data interfaces and interoperable repositories of climate and global change data which can be easily and efficiently accessed, integrated with other data sets, maintained and expanded over time." The initial focus of GCIS is to support the United States Third National Climate Assessment (NCA3), which is to publish reports that enhance the transparency and ability of decision-makers to understand the conclusions and use of the underlying data for their own purposes.

== Scope of work ==
The project scope includes analyzing alterations in climate, land use and land cover, natural resources including water, agriculture and biodiversity, atmospheric composition, chemical composition and ecological systems that may alter the Earth's capacity to sustain life.

Global change research includes activities aimed at describing and understanding the interactive physical, chemical and biological processes that regulate the Earth system; the unique environment that the Earth provides for life; changes that are occurring in the Earth system; and the manner in which such systems, environments and changes are influenced by human actions.

== Provenance and semantics ==
GCIS has developed information models and ontology to represent the content structure of the NCA3 and its associated provenance information and has been extending its models to incorporate more global change information. Records of objects and relationships within the GCIS are represented in a database for the Semantic Web, which can be queried using the SPARQL language. GCIS assigns globally unique persistent identifiers to all of the entities, activities, and agents relevant to provenance. Each identifier is mapped to a uniform resource identifier (URI) in the GCIS namespace, allowing use of those identifiers for the Semantic Web and other linked data systems. By categorizing, annotating, and linking provenance information, the GCIS becomes capable of answering provenance-tracking questions about global change research.

== GCIS ontology ==
The GCIS Ontology promotes representation and documentation by incorporating the World Wide Web Consortium (W3C)’s recommendation on provenance modeling (PROV) into the design. The ontology uses the namespace prefix GCIS. A conceptual map of the GCIS Ontology version 1.2 is accessible on the Web.
