= State of the Climate =

Annual report led by the NOAA/NCDC

National Oceanic and Atmospheric Administration

The State of the Climate is an annual report that is primarily led by the National Oceanic and Atmospheric Administration National Climatic Data Center (NOAA/NCDC), located in Asheville, North Carolina, but whose leadership and authorship spans roughly 100 institutions in about 50 countries.

== Release ==
The report appears as a supplement to a summer issue of the Bulletin of the American Meteorological Society (BAMS), a publication of the American Meteorological Society. The State of the Climate report, known until 2001 as the Climate Assessment, is an international effort.

== State of the Climate in 2010 ==
The 2010 edition (released June 28, 2011) contained submissions from 368 authors from 45 nations and covered 41 climate indicators. The 2010 edition contained a highlights document that summarized the major findings of the report. The State of the Climate summarizes the global and regional climate of the preceding calendar year and places it into a historical context. In addition, notable climatic anomalies and events are discussed.

Major findings in the 2010 report were:

- 2010 was one of the two warmest years of the instrumental temperature record
- The El Niño-Southern Oscillation transitioned from El Niño to La Niña
- Changes in the Arctic and Greenland continued to outpace those across the rest of the planet, on average

The 2010 issue included a sidebar detailing the multiple lines of evidence (major variables besides global temperature) consistent with the conclusion of a warming planet. An image associated with this sidebar has been recreated many times since, as the 11 (or ten) indicators of a warming planet.

== State of the Climate in 2011 ==
The 2011 edition contained submissions from 376 authors from 46 nations/territories. The La Nina event of that year was a major focus of the report. The cover featured East African women walking to retrieve water in a dust storm. East African drought is not atypical of La Nina episodes.

== State of the Climate in 2012 ==
The 2012 edition contained submissions from 394 authors from 54 nations/territories. Its cover featured an Arctic scene, reflecting major events in that region during the year.

Major findings in the 2012 report were:

- Average global sea level reached a record high (at the time) in 2012.
- Arctic sea ice reached a record-small minimum annual value during September 2012.

== State of the Climate in 2013 ==
The 2013 edition has been released on July 17, 2014. The American Meteorological Society published a supplemental paper online. The report was compiled by 425 scientists from 57 countries.

Major findings in the 2013 report include:

- The climate is changing faster than at any other point in recorded history.

== State of the Climate in 2014 ==
A report was released for the year of 2014.

== State of the Climate in 2015 ==
A report was released in August 2016 for 2015.

2015 was the hottest year to date. Greenhouse gases were highest on record. Global upper ocean heat content was highest on record. Global sea level was highest on record.

== State of the Climate in 2016 ==
Current as of report, 2016 surpassed 2015 as the warmest year in 137 years of recordkeeping.

Concentrations of carbon dioxide (CO_{2}) in the Earth's atmosphere surged by a record amount in 2016, according to the World Meteorological Organization.

== State of the Climate in 2017 ==
2017 was recorded as the third warmest year on record. 2017 was the warmest non-El Niño year in the instrumental record.

== State of the Climate in 2018 ==
All but one of the monthly global ocean and land temperature averages of 2018 ranked among the five warmest for their respective months, marking the year the fourth warmest year in NOAA's 139-year record.

== See also ==
- Global warming
- Climate state
- IPCC Fifth Assessment Report
- National Climate Assessment
