= U.S. Global Change Research Program =

American federal government agency

Coordinates: 38.89931°N 77.040305°W

The United States Global Change Research Program (USGCRP) coordinates and integrates federal research on changes in the global environment and their implications for society. The program began as a presidential initiative in 1989 and was codified by Congress through the Global Change Research Act of 1990 (P.L. 101-606), which called for "a comprehensive and integrated United States research program which will assist the Nation and the world to understand, assess, predict, and respond to human-induced and natural processes of global change."

Fifteen departments and agencies participate in the USGCRP, which was known as the U.S. Climate Change Science Program from 2002 through 2008. The program is steered by the Subcommittee on Global Change Research under the Committee on Environment, Natural Resources and Sustainability, overseen by the Executive Office of the President, and facilitated by a National Coordination Office. In 2024, the program added a Subcommittee on Climate Services to steer efforts in integrating climate research into useful and usable services for the Nation.

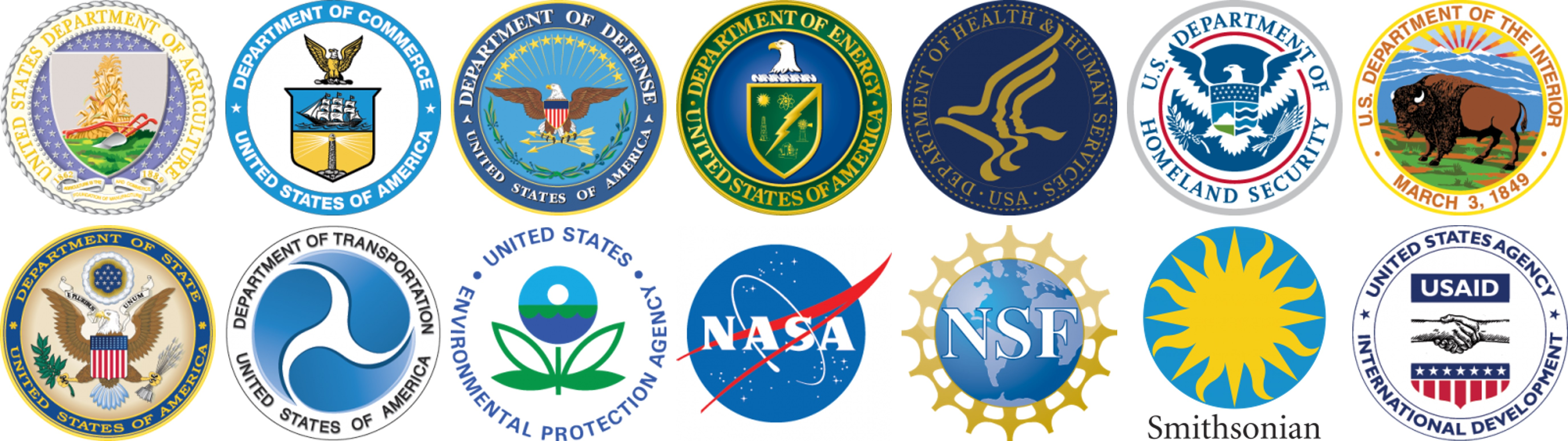
Fourteen federal entities participate in the United States Global Change Research Program (USGCRP).

Since its inception, the USGCRP has supported research and observational activities in collaboration with several other national and international science programs.

These activities led to major advances in several key areas including:

- Observing and understanding short- and long-term changes in climate, the ozone layer, and land cover;
- Identifying the impacts of these changes on ecosystems and society;
- Estimating future changes in the physical environment, and vulnerabilities and risks associated with those changes; and
- Providing scientific information to enable effective decision making to address the threats and opportunities posed by climate and global change.

These advances have been documented in numerous assessments commissioned by the program and have played prominent roles in international assessments such as those of the Intergovernmental Panel on Climate Change. Program results and plans are documented in the program's annual report, Our Changing Planet.

On July 1, 2025, the Trump administration closed down the globalchange.gov website, the federal website hosting five legislatively mandated reports on the state of the climate.

== Definition of global change ==
The Global Change Research Act of 1990 defines global change as: "Changes in the global environment (including alterations in climate, land productivity, oceans or other water resources, atmospheric chemistry, and ecological systems) that may alter the capacity of the Earth to sustain life."

== Participating agencies ==
Fifteen U.S. federal agencies—the USDA, DOC, DOD, DOE, HHS, DHS, HUD, DOI, DOS, DOT, EPA, NASA, NSF, Smithsonian Institution, and the USAID—participate in the USGCRP.

=== Department of Housing and Urban Development Becomes 15th Member of USGCRP ===
On December 4, 2023, Dr. Arati Prabhakar, Director of the Office of Science and Technology Policy and Assistant to the President for Science and Technology, named the Department of Housing and Urban Development (HUD) as the 15th member of the U.S. Global Change Research Program (USGCRP).

== National Climate Assessment (NCA) ==
The USGCRP has produced five National Climate Assessments: NCA1 entitled "Climate Change Impacts on the United States: the Potential Consequences of Climate Variability and Change" in 2000, NCA2 entitled "Global Climate Change Impacts in the United States" in 2009, NCA3 entitled "Global Climate Change Impacts in the United States" in 2014, NCA4 (in two volumes)—Volume 1 entitled "Climate Science Special Report" (CSSR) released October 2017 and Volume 2 entitled "Impacts, Risks, and Adaptation in the United States" released on November 23, 2018, and NCA5 entitled "The Fifth National Climate Assessment" released on November 14, 2023.

== National Nature Assessment (NNA) ==
The USGCRP's National Nature Assessment was created in 2021 to take stock of U.S. lands, waters, wildlife and the benefits they provide to the economy, health, climate, environmental justice, and national security. The Assessment was intended to also look ahead at how nature might change in the future, and what those changes may mean for our economy and our lives.

The First National Nature Assessment was expected to be released in 2026. As with other USGCRP assessments, the National Nature Assessment was drawing on expertise from the Federal Government, Indigenous communities, academia, non-profit organizations, and the private sector. The Assessment team held an array of public engagement opportunities to ensure the report answered questions that are important to every American’s life, and was informed by the best available evidence.

At the end of January 2025, the Trump administration shut down the program and removed information about it from the website. The non-federal authors built on the momentum and extensive public engagement for the NNA and created an independent, non-governmental knowledge assessment of nature, called the United By Nature Initiative.

== Strategic planning ==
The USGCRP Strategic Plan for 2022-2031 lays the foundation for meeting a new set of challenges and demands for useful, accessible, and inclusive data and information alongside advancements in understanding of a rapidly changing environment. It was developed by the Subcommittee on Global Change Research and draws on feedback from Federal agencies, the public, and the National Academies of Sciences, Engineering, and Medicine. This plan meets the requirements set forth in the U.S. Global Change Research Act of 1990 (Section 104) to provide a 10-year plan establishing goals and priorities for Federal global change research.

The USGCRP has been guided over time by the following strategic plans:

- 2022: The U.S. Global Change Research Program 2022–2031 Strategic Plan
- 2012: National Global Change Research Plan 2012-2021
- 2008: Revised Research Plan: An Update to the 2003 Strategic Plan
- 2003: Strategic Plan for the U.S. Climate Change Science Program
- 1989: Our Changing Planet: The FY 1990 Research Plan
- 1989: Our Changing Planet: A U.S. Strategy for Global Change Research

In 2003, the program undertook a series of "listening sessions" with a variety of stakeholder groups around the country to gain a better understanding of the emerging needs for climate information and ways in which federal research might be shaped to meet those needs. Stakeholder engagement that is a central element of the program's national assessment

== Program elements ==
The USGCRP's fifteen participating agencies coordinate their work through Interagency Working Groups (IWGs) that span a wide range of interconnected issues of climate and global change. The IWGs address major components of the Earth’s environmental and human systems, as well as cross-disciplinary approaches for addressing issues under the purview of the USGCRP. The IWGs are composed of representatives from federal departments and agencies responsible for activities in each area. The IWGs are overseen by the Subcommittee on Global Change Research.

Interagency Working Groups:

- Carbon Cycle Interagency Working Group (CCIWG)
- Climate Engagement and Capacity-Building Interagency Group (CEC)
- Climate Services Technical Working Group (CS-TWG)
- Coasts Interagency Group (CoastsIG)
- Federal Adaptation and Resilience Group (FARG)
- Greenhouse Gas Measurement and Monitoring Interagency Working Group (GHG IWG)
- Indicators Interagency Working Group (IndIWG)
- Integrated Observations Interagency Working Group (ObsIWG)
- Integrated Water Cycle Group (IWCG)
- Interagency Crosscutting Group on Climate Change and Human Health (CCHHG)
- Interagency Group on Integrative Modeling (IGIM)
- Interagency Task Force on Sea Level Change (TF-SLC)
- International Activities Interagency Working Group (IAIWG)
- Social Sciences Coordinating Committee (SSCC)
- Sustained Assessment Working Group (SAWG)
- Urban Interagency Group (UrbanIG)
- Working Group on National Security (WGNS)

Decision support activities---including the development of assessments and other tools and information to support adaptation and mitigation decision making---are coordinated in a distributed fashion across the program and are part of the mandate of all IWGs and the Subcommittee on Global Change Research.

National Climate Assessments have been integral components of USGCRP since its inception. Along with its strategic role as coordinator of Federal global change research, USGCRP is required by the Global Change Research Act of 1990 to conduct a National Climate Assessment (NCA). The NCA is an important resource for understanding and communicating climate change science and impacts in the United States.

The United States Global Change Research Information Office or GCRIO provides access to data and information on climate change research and global change-related educational resources on behalf of the various US Federal Agencies that are involved in the USGCRP. The GCRIO handles requests for documents related to USCRP. They also have outreach services to both domestic (Federal, state, and local) and international target audiences (including governments, institutions, researchers, educators, students, and the general public) in an effort to showcase relevant activities and results of the US Global Change Research Program and to help increase the awareness of the availability of data and information resources of the participating Federal Agencies.

== See also ==
- Global Change Information System
