= Global Change Research Act of 1990 =

1990 United States climate change law

- Other short titles: National Global Change Research Act of 1989; National Global Change Research Act of 1990
- Long title: An Act to require the establishment of a United States Global Change Research Program aimed at understanding and responding to global change, including the cumulative effects of human activities and natural processes on the environment, to promote discussions toward international protocols in global change research, and for other purposes.
- Acronyms (colloquial): GCRA, ICGCRA
- Nicknames: International Cooperation in Global Change Research Act of 1990
- Enacted by: the 101st United States Congress
- Effective: November 16, 1990

Citations
- Public law: 101-606
- Statutes at Large: 104 Stat. 3096

Codification
- Titles amended: 15 U.S.C.: Commerce and Trade
- U.S.C. sections created: 15 U.S.C. ch. 56A § 2921 et seq.

Legislative history
- Introduced in the Senate as S. 169 by Ernest Hollings (D–SC) on January 25, 1989; Committee consideration by Senate Commerce, Science, and Transportation, House Science, Space and Technology; Passed the Senate on February 6, 1990 (100-0 Roll call vote 5, via Senate.gov); Passed the House on October 26, 1990 (agreed voice vote) with amendment; Senate agreed to House amendment on October 28, 1990 (agreed voice vote); Signed into law by President George H. W. Bush on November 16, 1990

The Global Change Research Act 1990 is a United States law requiring research into global warming and related issues. It requires a report to Congress every four years on the environmental, economic, health and safety consequences of climate change.

According to a summary by the Congressional Research Service, the Act:

Directs the President, through the Federal Coordinating Council on Science, Engineering, and Technology (Council), to establish the Committee on Earth and Environmental Sciences to carry out Council functions under specified provisions of the National Science and Technology Policy, Organization, and Priorities Act of 1976 relating to global change research, to increase the effectiveness and productivity of Federal global change research efforts.

Directs the President to establish an interagency United States Global Change Research Program to improve understanding of global change. Requires the Chairman of the Council, through the Committee, to develop a National Global Change Research Plan for implementation of the Program. Sets forth required Plan contents and research elements, including that the Plan provide recommendations for collaboration within the Federal Government and among nations.

Requires the Chairman to enter into an agreement with the National Research Council to: (1) evaluate the scientific content of the Plan; and (2) provide information and advice and recommended priorities for future global change research. Requires the Committee to provide general guidance each year to each Federal agency or department participating in the Program with respect to preparation of requests for appropriations related to the Program.

Requires the Council, at least every four years, through the Committee, to submit to the President and the Congress an assessment regarding the findings of the Program and associated uncertainties, the effects of global change, and current and major long-term trends in global change.

Requires that the research findings of the Committee and of Federal agencies and departments be made available to the Environmental Protection Agency and all Federal agencies and departments.

Title II: International Cooperation in Global Change Research - International Cooperation in Global Change Research Act of 1990 - Declares that the President should direct the Secretary of State to initiate discussions with other nations on: (1) international agreements to coordinate global change research; and (2) an international research protocol for cooperation on the development of energy technologies which have minimally adverse effects on the environment. Directs the President to establish an Office of Global Change Research Information to disseminate to foreign governments and their citizens, businesses, and institutions scientific research useful in preventing, mitigating, or adapting to the effects of global change.

Title III: Growth Decision Aid - Directs the Secretary of Commerce to: (1) conduct a study on the implications of growth and development on urban, suburban, and rural communities; and (2) based on the study, produce a decision aid to assist State and local authorities in planning and managing growth and development while preserving community character.

Following the publication of the first National Climate Assessment Report there were accusations that information was being suppressed, leading to complacency around public works, such as New Orleans flood defences. Greenpeace, the Center for Biological Diversity and Friends of the Earth challenged the delay in federal district court on August 21, 2007. A judge ruled that an updated national assessment must be produced by May 31, 2008.

== See also ==
- Committee on Climate Change Science and Technology Integration
- National Climate Assessment
