= National Climate Assessment =

Research initiative by the US government

The National Climate Assessment (NCA) is an initiative within the U.S. federal government focused on climate change science, formed under the auspices of the Global Change Research Act of 1990. The U.S. Global Change Research Program (USGCRP) which coordinates a team of experts and receives input from a Federal Advisory Committee. The first National Climate Assessment was published in 2000. Since four additional reports have been published, with the Fifth report published in 2023.

Work halted in 2025 on the 6th when funding was eliminated during the second Trump Administration. The scientists and experts who had been compiling the report were then dismissed as the scope of the report was being re-evaluated". On June 30, 2025, the government website hosting access to all past National Climate Assessment Reports was taken down. In late 2025, climate.us established a website hosting the 5th National Climate Assessment.

== Background ==
The NCA is a major product of the U.S. Global Change Research Program (USGCRP) which coordinates a team of experts and receives input from a Federal Advisory Committee. NCA research is integrated and summarized in the mandatory ongoing National Climate Assessment Reports. The reports are "extensively reviewed by the public and experts, including federal agencies and a panel of the National Academy of Sciences. For the Third National Climate Assessment, released in 2014, USGCRP coordinated hundreds of experts and received advice from a sixty-member Federal Advisory Committee. The Fourth NCA (NCA4) was released in two volumes, in October 2017 and in November 2018.

== History ==
The First National Climate Assessment was published in 2000. (Note: The First National Climate Assessment Report was "prepared by the National Assessment Synthesis Team (NAST), an advisory committee chartered under the Federal Advisory Committee Act to help the US Global Change Research Program fulfill its mandate under the Global Change Research Act of 1990. The National Science and Technology Council forwarded the report to the President and Congress for their consideration as required by the Global Change Research Act. Administrative support for the US Global Change Research Program is provided by the University Corporation for Atmospheric Research, which is sponsored by the National Science Foundation (NCA 2000).") Between 2002 and 2009, USGCRP previously known as the U.S. Climate Change Science Program (CCSP), produced 21 Synthesis and Assessment Products (SAPs). The second NCA was published in 2009 and the third was released in 2014.

NCA's overarching goal according to their May 20, 2011 engagement strategy summary, "is to enhance the ability of the U.S. to anticipate, mitigate, and adapt to changes in the global environment (NCA 2011:2)."

The vision is to advance an inclusive, broad based, and sustained process for assessing and communicating scientific knowledge of the impacts, risks, and vulnerabilities associated with a changing global climate in support of decision-making across the U.S.

— NCA May 20, 2011 page2

According to the USGCRP official website the NCA,

Informs the nation about already observed changes, the current status of the climate, and anticipated trends for the future; integrates scientific information from multiple sources and sectors to highlight key findings and significant gaps in our knowledge; establishes consistent methods for evaluating climate impacts in the U.S. in the context of broader global change, and provides input to Federal science priorities and is used by U.S. citizens, communities, and businesses as they create more sustainable and environmentally sound plans for the nation's future.

In 2013, the President's Climate Action Plan released by the Executive Office of the President specifically noted the importance of the National Climate Assessments in achieving the goal of "Using Sound Science to Manage Climate Impacts".

On August 18, 2017, a 15-member advisory committee that was tasked with writing "concrete guidance" based on the assessment was disbanded during the first Trump administration. NOAA said that the disbandment of the committee would not "impact the completion of the Fourth National Climate Assessment." Under the every five year schedule, the next report was scheduled for 2027. Work halted in 2025 when funding was eliminated during the second Trump Administration. The scientists and experts who had been compiling the report were then dismissed as the scope of the report was being re-evaluated". On June 30, 2025, the government website hosting access to all past National Climate Assessment Reports was taken down.

== Global Change Research Act ==
The National Climate Assessment (NCA) is conducted under the auspices of the Global Change Research Act of 1990. The GCRA requires a report to the President and the Congress every four years that integrates, evaluates, and interprets the findings of the U.S. Global Change Research Program (USGCRP); analyzes the effects of global change on the natural environment, agriculture, energy production and use, land and water resources, transportation, human health and welfare, human social systems, and biological diversity; and analyzes current trends in global change, both human-induced and natural, and projects major trends for the subsequent 25 to 100 years.

The Federal government is responsible for producing these reports through the U.S. Global Change Research Program (USGCRP), a collaboration of 13 Federal agencies and departments.

== Advisory Committees ==
The National Climate Assessment and Development Advisory Committee (NCADAC) was a 60-person U.S. Federal Advisory Committee which oversaw the development of the draft Third NCA report and made recommendations about the ongoing assessment process. The committee was sun-set in fall 2014. The Department of Commerce established the NCADAC in December 2010 as per the Federal Advisory Committee Act (1972). 1972. The NCADAC was supported through the National Oceanic and Atmospheric Administration (NOAA).

The successor Advisory Committee for the Sustained National Climate Assessment, established in 2015, was sunsetted by the Trump administration on August 20, 2017. The fifteen-member committee was chaired by Richard H. Moss.

== National Assessment Synthesis Team (NAST) ==
In 1998, the first National Assessment Synthesis Team (NAST) was formed under the auspices of the Subcommittee on Global Change Research (SGCR), through the Committee on Environmental and Natural Resources (CENR) and the National Science and Technology Council (NSTC) with members from "government, academia, and private enterprise." Its mandate was to broadly "design and conduct" "national efforts to assess the consequences of climate variability and climate change for the United States." NAST is an advisory committee chartered under the Federal Advisory Committee Act to help the US Global Change Research Program fulfill its legal mandate under the Global Change Research Act of 1990. The NSTC forwarded the report to the President and Congress for their consideration as required by the Global Change Research Act. Administrative support for the US Global Change Research Program was provided by the University Corporation for Atmospheric Research, which was sponsored by the National Science Foundation." In their 2001 assessment, the NAST concluded in the United States, "natural ecosystems appear to be the most vulnerable to the harmful effects of climate change." In their 2001 report they also described long-term major trends in climate change in the twenty-first century. The first NAST co-chairs were Dr. Jerry M. Melillo of the Marine Biological Laboratory in Woods Hole, Massachusetts, Tony Janetos, and Thomas Karl.

== Reports ==
=== First National Climate Assessment (NCA1) 2000 ===
The First National Climate Assessment prepared by National Assessment Synthesis Team (NAST), entitled "Climate Change Impacts on the United States: the Potential Consequences of Climate Variability and Change", was released in 2000. The report was a multidisciplinary effort to study and portray in regional detail the potential effects of human-induced global warming on the United States. The project was articulated into some 20 regional studies - each involving dozens of scientific and academic experts as well as representatives of industry and environmental groups.

=== Second National Climate Assessment (NCA2) 2009 ===
The Second National Climate Assessment, entitled "Global Climate Change Impacts in the United States", was published in 2009. In addition to synthesizing, evaluating, and reporting on what was known about the potential consequences of climate change, the report also sought to identify potential measures to adapt to climate change and to identify the highest research priorities for the future.

=== Third National Climate Assessment (NCA3) 2014 ===
The Third National Climate Assessment report entitled "Global Climate Change Impacts in the United States" was delivered to the Federal Government for review in 2013 and became available to the public in May 2014.

The Third NCA report was written by more than 300 authors drawn from academia; local, state, tribal, and Federal governments; and the private and nonprofit sectors. The NCADAC selected these authors based on criteria that included expertise, experience, and ensuring a variety of perspectives.

After review by the NCADAC, the draft Third NCA report was released for public review and comment on January 14, 2013. By the time the public comment period closed on April 12, 2013, more than 4000 comments had been received from 644 government, non-profit, and commercial sector employees, educators, students, and the general public.

Concurrently, the National Research Council, part of the National Academy of Sciences, reviewed the draft and submitted feedback. The NCADAC produced a final draft of their report and provided it to the federal government for review in late fall of 2013; a final public version of the report was released on May 6, 2014. A number of derivative products, including a printed "Highlights" document, have been produced in addition to the full interactive electronic NCA document that is available on the web.

In preparation for the 2014 NCA, the USGCRP began in 2011 to call for wider participation and reinforced the long-term goal of improving climate literacy. Recruitment began in 2011 for NCAnet, a network of organizations working with the NCA, to further engage producers and users of assessment information across the United States. NCAnet was officially established and registered at the Federal Register on April 13, 2012.

=== Fourth National Climate Assessment (NCA4) 2017/2018 ===
In Fourth National Climate Assessment (NCA4) Volume 1, released in October 2017, entitled "Climate Science Special Report" (CSSR), researchers reported that "it is extremely likely that human activities, especially emissions of greenhouse gases, are the dominant cause of the observed warming since the mid-20th century. For the warming over the last century, there is no convincing alternative explanation supported by the extent of the observational evidence." A 2018 CRS cited the October 2017 CSSR: "Detection and attribution studies, climate models, observations, paleoclimate data, and physical understanding lead to high confidence (extremely likely) that more than half of the observed global mean warming since 1951 was caused by humans, and high confidence that internal climate variability played only a minor role (and possibly even a negative contribution) in the observed warming since 1951. The key message and supporting text summarizes extensive evidence documented in the peer-reviewed detection and attribution literature, including in the IPCC Fifth Assessment Report." Volume 2 entitled "Impacts, Risks, and Adaptation in the United States" was released on November 23, 2018. According to Volume II, "Without substantial and sustained global mitigation and regional adaptation efforts, climate change is expected to cause growing losses to American infrastructure and property and impede the rate of economic growth over this century." The National Oceanic and Atmospheric Administration (NOAA) was "administrative lead agency" in the preparation of the Fourth National Climate Assessment. According to NOAA, "human health and safety" and American "quality of life" is "increasingly vulnerable to the impacts of climate change". The USGCRP team that produced the report included thirteen federal agencies— NOAA, the DOA, DOC, DOD, DOE, HHS, DOI, DOS, DOT, EPA, NASA, NSF, Smithsonian Institution, and the USAID—with the assistance of "1,000 people, including 300 leading scientists, roughly half from outside the government." According to The New York Times, in an attempt to bury the report, the first Trump administration released the report the day after Thanksgiving.

=== Fifth National Climate Assessment (NCA5) 2023 ===
NCA5 was published on November 14, 2023.

=== Sixth National Climate Assessment (NCA6) 2028 ===
All authors, scientists, and contributors working on the NCA6 scheduled for release in 2028 were fired by the second Trump administration on April 28, 2025. The administration earlier canceled a contract with ICF International that provided technical consulting for the work. On July 29, 2025, the Energy Department released a report promoting climate change denial and disinformation written by prominent climate deniers who were given government jobs. Scientists widely criticized the report for an abundance of errors and denial of the scientific consensus on climate change.

== Global Change Information System ==
The U.S. Global Change Research Program (USGCRP) has established the Global Change Information System (GCIS) to better coordinate and integrate the use of federal information products on changes in the global environment and the implications of those changes for society. The GCIS is an open-source, web-based resource for traceable, sound global change data, information, and products. Designed for use by scientists, decision makers, and the public, the GCIS provides coordinated links to a select group of information products produced, maintained, and disseminated by government agencies and organizations. As well as guiding users to global change research products selected by the 13 member agencies, the GCIS serves as a key access point to assessments, reports, and tools produced by the USGCRP. The GCIS is managed, integrated, and curated by USGCRP.

== See also ==
- National Research Council, report on climate change
- Presidential Climate Action Plan
- State of the Climate
- Climate security
