= American Clean Energy and Security Act =

Proposed United States climate and energy legislation (Waxman-Markey); never passed

American Clean Energy and Security Act of 2009
- Long title: A bill to create clean energy jobs, achieve energy independence, reduce global warming pollution and transition to a clean energy economy.
- Acronyms (colloquial): ACES, Waxman-Markey Bill

Legislative history
- Introduced in the House of Representatives as H.R. 2454 by Henry Waxman (D-CA) on May 15, 2009; Committee consideration by Energy and Commerce, Foreign Affairs, Financial Services, Education and Labor, Science and Technology, Transportation and Infrastructure, Natural Resources, Agriculture, and Ways and Means; Passed the House on June 26, 2009 (219-212)

The American Clean Energy and Security Act of 2009 (ACES) was an energy bill in the 111th United States Congress (H.R. 2454) that would have established a variant of an emissions trading plan similar to the European Union Emission Trading Scheme. The bill was approved by the House of Representatives on June 26, 2009, by a vote of 219–212. With no prospect of overcoming a threatened Republican filibuster, the bill was never brought to the floor of the Senate for discussion or a vote. The House passage of the bill marked the first time the legislature had approved a bill intended to reduce greenhouse gas emissions.

The bill was also known as the Waxman-Markey Bill, after its authors, Representatives Henry A. Waxman of California and Edward J. Markey of Massachusetts, both Democrats. Waxman was at the time the chairman of the Energy and Commerce Committee, and Markey was the chairman of that committee's Energy and Power Subcommittee.

== Summary of provisions ==
The bill proposed a cap and trade system, under which the government would set a limit (cap) on the total amount of greenhouse gases that can be emitted nationally. Companies then buy or sell (trade) permits to emit these gases, primarily carbon dioxide CO_{2}. The cap is reduced incrementally over time to reduce total carbon emissions. The cap-and-trade program proposed by the legislation would reduce overall greenhouse gas emissions while generating revenue. A June 2009 analysis by the Congressional Budget Office (CBO) projected that the program would be deficit-neutral and would cost households an average of $175 per year.The legislation would set a cap on total emissions over the 2012–2050 period and would require regulated entities to hold rights, or allowances, to emit greenhouse gases. After allowances were initially distributed, entities would be free to buy and sell them (the trade part of the program). Those entities that emit more gases face a higher cost, which provides an economic incentive to reduce emissions. Key elements of the bill include:

- Requires electric utilities to meet 20% of their electricity demand through renewable energy (such as wind, solar, and geothermal) and energy efficiency by 2020. 5% can be met through energy efficiency savings, with an additional 3% allowable with state-level certification.
- Subsidizes new clean energy technologies and energy efficiency, including renewable energy ($90 billion by 2025 for renewable energy subsidies), carbon capture and sequestration (CCS) technologies ($60 billion), electric and other advanced technology vehicles ($20 billion), and basic scientific research and development ($20 billion).
- Protects consumers from energy price increases. According to estimates from the Environmental Protection Agency (EPA), the reductions in carbon pollution required by the legislation will cost American families less than a postage stamp per day (less than $0.50 per day), about $13.20 a month, and $160.60 a year.
- It set the same target for reductions in emissions of carbon dioxide, methane, and other greenhouse gases as that proposed by President Barack Obama. The bill required a 17-percent emissions reduction from 2005 levels by 2020. There is a provision whereby 5% of this standard can be met through energy efficiency savings, as well as an additional 3% with certification of the Governor of the state in which the provider operates. Alternative compliance payments were $25/MWh in violation of the standard, adjusted for inflation beginning in 2010.
- It included a renewable electricity standard (almost identical to a renewable portfolio standard, but narrowly tailored to electrical energy) requiring each electricity provider who supplies over 4 million MWh to produce 20 percent of its electricity from renewable sources (such as wind, solar, and geothermal) by 2020. There is a provision whereby 5% of this standard can be met through energy efficiency savings, as well as an additional 3% with certification of the Governor of the state in which the provider operates.

Alternative compliance payments were $25/MWh in violation of the standard, adjusted for inflation beginning in 2010.

- It provides for modernization of the electrical grid.
- It provides for expanded production of electric vehicles and other advanced automobile technology.
- It mandates significant increases in energy efficiency in buildings, home appliances, and electricity generation.

The bill's cap-and-trade program allocates 85% of allowances to industry for free, auctioning the remainder. The revenue from these allowances will be used to finance conservation of tropical forests abroad and to support low-income households. 30% of the allowances will be allocated directly to local distribution companies (LDCs) who are mandated to use them exclusively for the benefit of customers. 5% will go to merchant coal generators and others with long-term power purchase agreements.

== Congressional Budget Office analysis ==
A study in June 2009 by the non-partisan Congressional Budget Office (CBO) indicated that the bill would be roughly deficit-neutral for the government over the next decade:

enacting the legislation would increase revenues by $873 billion over the 2010–2019 period and would increase direct spending by $864 billion over that 10-year period. In total, CBO and JCT estimate that enacting the legislation would reduce future budget deficits by about $4 billion over the 2010–2014 period and by about $9 billion over the 2010–2019 period

The study also indicated that the tax burden on individual households would be limited:

the net annual economy-wide cost of the cap-and-trade program in 2020 would be $22 billion—or about $175 per household ... households in the lowest income quintile would see an average net benefit of about $40 in 2020, while households in the highest income quintile would see a net cost of $245. Added costs for households in the second lowest quintile would be about $40 that year; in the middle quintile, about $235; and in the fourth quintile, about $340. Overall net costs would average 0.2 percent of households' after-tax income.

The analysis did not attempt to quantify the environmental benefits of reduced greenhouse gas emissions. The report also stated that the "net financial impact of the program on households in different income brackets would depend in large part on how many allowances were sold (versus given away), how the free allowances were allocated, and how any proceeds from selling allowances were used. That net impact would reflect both the added costs that households experienced because of higher prices and the share of the allowance value that they received in the form of benefit payments, rebates, tax decreases or credits, wages, and returns on their investments." In other words, while a cap and trade system imposes costs on high emitters, it can generate revenues for low emitters that sell permits to them. While the government sets the bar on emission levels, the market determines who gains and who loses.

== Public debate ==
=== Supporters of and arguments for the bill ===
The bill was supported by a number of environmental organizations including, the Defenders of Wildlife, the Alliance for Climate Protection, the Environmental Defense Fund, the National Wildlife Federation, The Nature Conservancy, the Audubon Society, the Natural Resources Defense Council and the Sierra Club. The League of Conservation Voters threatened to withhold endorsements from any representative who votes against the bill.

The Energy and Commerce Committee received letters of support from a broad range of organizations, including the United Auto Workers, Exelon, General Electric, Dow Chemical Company, Pacific Gas and Electric Company, and DuPont. The New York Times noted that "industry officials were split, with the United States Chamber of Commerce and the National Association of Manufacturers opposing the bill and some of the nation's biggest corporations, including Dow Chemical and Ford, backing it."

The Republicans for Environmental Protection (REP), a national grassroots organization, issued a press release after the vote stating "House passage today of the American Clean Energy and Security Act is a step in the right direction in the fight against dangerous climate change and for developing cleaner, more secure energy resources." David Jenkins, REP vice president for government and political affairs, noted that "Doing nothing is not an option. The costs and risks of failing to limit greenhouse gas emissions are too high. We owe it to our country and to our country's future citizens to take action. Today, the House looked to the future and did the right thing for our economy, security, and environment."

The Environmental Protection Agency (EPA) estimated the discussion draft version of the bill to cost average households $98–$140 per year. According to an analysis by the Environmental Protection Agency (EPA), the overall economic impact of the cap-and-trade program on household consumption was projected to be modest. The EPA estimated that the program would reduce household consumption by 0.1% to 0.2% in 2020, which would translate to an average annual cost of approximately $80 to $111 per household.

Economist Paul Krugman argued for the bill in September 2009, while attacking the bill's opponents: "It's important, then, to understand that claims of immense economic damage from climate legislation are as bogus, in their own way, as climate change denial. Saving the planet won't come free (although the early stages of conservation actually might). But it won't cost all that much either." Economist Paul Krugman argued in favor of the cap-and-trade system, explaining that it creates a financial incentive for companies to reduce emissions by allowing them to sell excess permits. He noted, "Even when polluters get free permits, they still have an incentive to reduce their emissions, so that they can sell their excess permits to someone else." Krugman emphasized that cap-and-trade has been successful in other contexts, such as reducing sulfur dioxide emissions to combat acid rain.

  - Tia Nelson, Executive Secretary of the Wisconsin Board of Commissioners of Public Lands, testified before the House Energy and Commerce Subcommittee on Energy and Environment on April 24, 2009, in support of the American Clean Energy and Security Act. She emphasized the importance of federal action on climate change, stating, "Federal legislation is essential to addressing the growing risks of climate change." Nelson highlighted Wisconsin's state-led initiatives in renewable energy and emissions reductions as a model for national policy, demonstrating that meaningful progress could be achieved through innovative policies and collaborative action.

=== Arguments against the bill ===
Criticism focused on ultimate costs and benefits of the plan. A report written for The Heritage Foundation, a conservative think tank, on the discussion draft of the bill claimed that the economy would react to this cap-and-trade system like it would lead to an energy crisis. This same report also claimed that the impact on global temperature by the end of the 21st century would amount to a reduction of no more than 0.2 °C. A Congressional Budget Office (CBO) analysis estimated that the cap-and-trade provisions of the American Clean Energy and Security Act would result in a net economy-wide cost of approximately $22 billion in 2020. This translates to an average annual cost of about $175 per household when considering both direct and indirect expenses. Additionally, the Environmental Protection Agency (EPA) projected that the implementation of the Act would lead to a 0.3% decrease in the Gross Domestic Product (GDP) by 2030. This reflects the economic adjustments required to meet the emission reduction targets specified in the legislation.

==== Equity issues ====
Economist Arnold Kling said the bill "maximizes rent-seeking (favoritism toward particular businesses) and minimizes carbon reduction". Other economists argued that the bill would create significant financial costs. Additionally, contributors to Yale Environment 360 expressed concerns that the compromises made in the legislation, while politically necessary, could undermine its effectiveness in addressing environmental justice issues. These compromises were seen as favoring large corporations and potentially leaving low-income households and small businesses at a disadvantage in adapting to the cap-and-trade system. The Wall Street Journal accused the Congressional Budget Office (CBO) of significantly underestimating the bill's ultimate costs, pointing out supposed flaws in its calculations. The Wall Street Journal also suggested that the bill's costs would disproportionately affect lower-income households, for which the CBO estimates did not account. The New York Times reported that the bill's provisions to levy tariffs on Chinese imports due to carbon emissions could provoke a trade war. The Competitive Enterprise Institute argued that the bill was essentially the "largest tax hike in world history". The American Petroleum Institute, representing the petroleum and natural gas industry, said the bill would place "disproportionate burden on all consumers of gasoline, diesel fuel, heating oil, jet fuel, propane and other petroleum products", and by 2035, it would cause gasoline prices in excess of $4.00 per gallon by today's standards.

==== Nuclear power ====
The Nuclear Energy Institute (NEI) expressed concerns that the American Clean Energy and Security Act did not provide sufficient incentives for nuclear energy development, which they argued is essential for achieving significant reductions in greenhouse gas emissions. Nuclear power plants generate minimal greenhouse gases, yet one critic wrote that the bill did not sufficiently advocate this clean power source. In response to this criticism, House of Representatives staff members wrote that the electricity generated by nuclear power required the purchase of far fewer allowances than other forms of electricity generation; that the bill provided various types of financial support to build clean energy generating sources, including nuclear; and that an EPA study indicated that twice as many nuclear plants would be built if the law was passed versus the status quo.

==== Other high emitting nations ====
There was criticism that unless China and India adopted similar emissions standards, the impact on global climate would be insubstantial. This was largely an argument based on the leading role these two countries had obtained in carbon dioxide emissions which could reach 34% of the global total by 2030. The International Energy Agency (IEA) noted that unilateral action by the United States without corresponding commitments from major emitters like China and India could lead to "carbon leakage", where industries relocate to countries with less stringent emission controls, potentially undermining global emission reduction efforts.

==== Doubts about a carbon market ====
Critics also noted that the bill would create the largest market in carbon in the world. It would also "open up the so-called 'sub-prime carbon' market in carbon offsets, whereby industries can claim emissions reductions by investing in various projects around the world that theoretically reduce greenhouse gas emissions. The Government Accountability Office (GAO) claimed it was virtually impossible to verify whether carbon offsets represented real emissions reductions. Critics noted that the bill would create the largest carbon market in the world, raising concerns about transparency and reliability. The Government Accountability Office (GAO) reported that voluntary carbon markets often lack verification systems, making it difficult to confirm whether offsets genuinely reduce emissions. Additionally, the Energy Policy Institute at the University of Chicago criticized lobbying efforts for shaping the market to favor industry interests, citing the over-allocation of emissions permits and insufficient safeguards against fraud.

==== Non federal jurisdictions ====
On June 26, 2009, Reuters reported that "states that have set the U.S. agenda on addressing greenhouse gas emissions are lining up behind a federal climate bill, fearing signs of dissent would weaken a plan that still faces hurdles." The article noted that representatives from members of the Eastern U.S. 10-state Regional Greenhouse Gas Initiative, the Midwestern Greenhouse Gas Reduction Accord, which joined six U.S. states with Canada's Manitoba, and the 11-state-and-four Canadian province Western Climate Initiative were supporting the legislation, even though the Eastern market member states, which had already been operating under a cap-and-trade system, "would lose a direct revenue stream of hundreds of millions of dollars if the federal plan were passed." The three existing regional carbon cap and trade programs, which were in varying states of development, would likely be merged into the national plan, since "the federal 'cap-and-trade' plan pre-empts any similar state scheme from 2012 to 2017." However, ACES left states the option of resuming trade of pollution credits after 2017 and "would allow holders of RGGI allowances to convert them into federal allowances, which means the states will likely hold auctions until the federal plan begins. The National Association of Clean Air Agencies (NACAA) expressed apprehension that the federal cap-and-trade program could preempt more stringent state-level initiatives, potentially hindering aggressive local efforts to combat climate change.

Citizens Against Government Waste named both Reps. Waxman and Markey the May 2009 Porkers of the month for "adding and altering provisions to placate special interests and buy the votes of appropriately skeptical members of Congress".

=== Debate among environmental organizations and scientists ===
While the Environmental Defense Fund and many other environmental organizations strongly supported the bill, other environmentalists sharply criticized the legislation as too weak and called urgently for it to be amended so as to include additional and more vigorous measures to protect climate and natural resources.

Some environmentalists criticized the fuel efficiency standards in the "cash for clunkers" provision of the bill, because new cars would only need to get 22 MPG to be considered fuel efficient. New SUVs and pickup trucks would only need to get 18 MPG to be considered fuel efficient. Vehicles older than 25 years were not eligible for the program. CNN reported that "One of the biggest criticisms is that it's not very environmentally friendly."

The New York Times noted that "while some environmentalists enthusiastically supported the legislation, others, including Greenpeace and Friends of the Earth, opposed it." Friends of the Earth, an international environmental organization, announced its opposition to ACES as they believed the bill was too weak. They cited support from Shell Oil Company and Duke Energy as evidence of the bill's shortcomings. They also objected to the removal of the EPA's existing authority to use the Clean Air Act to counter emissions of greenhouse gases. Environmental organizations critical of the bill said the bill fell short by allowing for 85 percent or more of pollution permits to be given away free of cost to the electricity sector. A coalition of environmental groups released a statement saying that "to craft a bill that allows for 2 billion tons of offsets per year—roughly equivalent to 27 percent of 2007 U.S. greenhouse gas emissions—is to allow for continued and dangerous delay in real action by our country at a time when the world is looking to the U.S. for leadership on climate change." Critics of the bill were concerned about it not going far enough, and claimed that there were too many concessions made to special interests in rewriting the bill. Thus, making the bill weak and potentially harmful to the economy and environment.

Dr. James E. Hansen, one of the first to warn about the risks of climate change and an advocate of taking related action, also argued strongly against the bill: 1) It restricted the EPA's ability to regulate CO_{2} emissions from power plants; 2) it set "meager" targets for emission reductions, with only a 13% reduction by 2020; 3) it lacked certain controls important to the trading of allowances to emit carbon; and 4) it failed to set predictable prices for carbon, making it harder for businesses and households to make investment decisions. Dr. Hansen advocated a carbon tax rather than a cap and trade system. Alternatively, Senators Maria Cantwell and Susan Collins introduced the Carbon Limits and Energy for America's Renewal (CLEAR) Act. This bill proposed a cap and dividend approach in which 75% of the revenue is returned to taxpayers in the form of a dividend, and the rest is used to fund to development of renewable energy.

=== Media response ===
News agencies Reuters and Agence France-Presse and United Kingdom newspaper The Guardian reported the narrow passage of the "historic" legislation in the House, regarding the vote to be a "major" and "hard-fought" victory for President Obama, while an Associated Press article, carried by the Canadian Broadcasting Corporation, reported the vote to be "a triumph for [the] U.S. President."

The New York Times commented that "the House legislation reflects a series of concessions necessary to attract the support of Democrats from different regions and with different ideologies. In the months of horse-trading before the vote Friday, the bill's targets for emissions of heat-trapping gases were weakened, its mandate for renewable electricity was scaled back, and incentives for industries were sweetened." Business Week emphasized its perceived significance of the legislation and its passage in the House, declaring "June 26, 2009, will go down as an historic moment in world's efforts to tackle climate change. For the first time, a Congressional body passed legislation that would place mandatory limits on the emissions of the greenhouse gases that cause global warming."

== Impact on Copenhagen Climate Change Conference ==
It was reported that the passage of ACES in Congress would increase the likelihood that a successor to the Kyoto Protocol would be adopted at the United Nations Climate Change Conference 2009 in Copenhagen. The Guardian US environment correspondent noted that ACES passing the US House of Representatives "delivers an important boost to the prospects of reaching an agreement for international action on climate change at Copenhagen this year." The New York Times noted that "the German chancellor, Angela Merkel, who was in Washington on Friday to meet with Mr. Obama, strongly endorsed the bill even though it fell short of European goals for reducing the emissions of heat-trapping gases."This endorsement underscored the urgency of U.S. leadership in global climate efforts, potentially galvanizing commitments from major emitting nations, such as China and India, to adopt stronger emissions reduction targets.

== Legislative history ==
The bill was offered as a "discussion draft" in the House Committee on Energy and Commerce on March 31, 2009. A final version of the legislation was introduced on May 15, 2009, by the same title, assigned bill number H.R. 2454.

On May 21, 2009, the bill passed out of the Energy and Commerce Committee by a vote of 33–25, largely falling along political party lines.

=== Energy and Commerce Committee markup ===
Republicans proposed over 400 amendments to the bill, the majority of which many think were proposed to delay passage. Some of the more prominent from both parties are listed below:

==== Accepted ====
- John Dingell (D-MI) offered an amendment that establishes a bank to assist with loans for clean energy development.
- Betty Sutton (D-OH) offered an amendment establishing a "Cash for Clunkers" program, giving $3,500 or $4,500 toward the purchase or lease of more fuel efficient vehicles if anyone trades in qualifying, less-efficient vehicles.
- Kathy Castor (D-FL) offered an amendment giving states the ability to adopt feed-in tariffs for renewable energy as defined in the bill.
- Henry Waxman (D-CA) offered an amendment creating a classification of "central procurement state" that allows existing renewable energy legislation passed by states before January 1, 2009, to supersede some provisions of the bill.
- Betty McCollum (D-MN) successfully proposed an amendment ensuring that low-income households would have access to rebates or financial incentives aimed at improving energy efficiency in their homes.

==== Defeated ====
- Mike Rogers (R-MI) offered an amendment that would have cancelled the Act unless China and India adopt similar standards.
- Roy Blunt (R-MO) offered an amendment that would have cancelled the Act if the average price of electricity in a residential sector increases by 10% or more. After defeat, he offered a second amendment that would have cancelled only Title III (the cap-and-trade plan) of the Act if residential electricity prices rise by 20%. After defeat of this measure, George Radanovich (R-CA) offered a similar amendment that would have cancelled only Title III if electricity prices in the residential sector rise by 100%. This measure was also defeated. In the hearing, Bart Stupak (D-MI) called into question the seriousness of these "message amendments". He stated they are only offered to be used by the Republicans to spur sensational headlines about lack of sympathy by Democrats. Ranking Member Joe Barton (R-TX) responded that they were indeed "message amendments" to the American people in an attempt to convey that supporters of the bill care nothing about cost to the ratepayer.
- Lee Terry (R-NE) offered an amendment that would have cancelled the Act if average gas prices reach $5 per gallon.
- Fred Upton (R-MI) offered an amendment that would have suspended the Act if the nation's unemployment rate for the prior year reaches 15% as a result of the Act.
- Marsha Blackburn (R-TN) offered an amendment that would have required the U.S. Environmental Protection Agency (EPA) to label energy bills, food, manufactured products and fuels with the price impact this law has on the item.
- Cliff Stearns (R-FL) offered an amendment that would have removed existing nuclear power from the baseline of the Renewable Electricity Standard. (This amendment would have potentially reduced the overall implementation of renewable energy under this act by around 20%, the amount of nuclear electricity generation in the United States).
- Bob Goodlatte (R-VA) sought to provide exemptions for small businesses, arguing that the proposed energy mandates could impose significant financial hardships on small-scale operations.

By the end of May 20, 2009, 2 Republican and 24 Democratic amendments had been adopted. 15 Republican amendments had been defeated. No amendment sponsored by a Democrat had yet been defeated.

=== Rules Committee resolution ===
At 3:47 am on June 26, 2009, H.Res. 587 was reported to the house, which amended H.R. 2454, adding to the bill. This resolution was passed in the house just hours later at 11:21 am. Republicans complained that neither the public nor the representatives were given adequate time to study the 310-page amendment. Markey refuted Rush Limbaugh's assertion that the bill was not available at all, saying the bill was available to read on the Internet and at the reading clerk's desk since the 3:47 am reporting. The resolution included provisions that outlined key adjustments to emissions caps and funding mechanisms for clean energy projects. This was seen as an attempt to address lingering concerns about the economic impacts of the bill while ensuring sufficient support for its passage in the House.

=== Final debate and floor vote ===
Speaker Nancy Pelosi scheduled the vote for June 26, 2009. The week leading up to the vote was marked by courting moderate Republicans and on-the-fence Democrats from rural and coal districts to support the legislation in what was expected to be a close vote. On the day of the vote, Democrats were still working to ensure they had the votes needed to pass the bill. Republicans tried to pull back their proposed amendments, realizing they were giving the Democrats more time to corral votes, however, they were unable to pull their proposed amendments off the floor. Shortly before the vote, John Boehner read aloud to the House from most of the 300 page Manager's amendment that was filed at 3:09 am on the day of the vote. He voiced opposition to the practice of changing bills in the middle of the night before the vote, and concern that the manager's amendment made substantial changes to the bill. He did not want the House to vote on the bill before the members could learn what was in the amendment, so he read much of it aloud. Manager's amendments are supposed to be for clerical changes only, not substantive ones. Patrick J. Kennedy (D-RI) returned from rehab to cast a 'Yes' vote, and Ellen Tauscher (D-CA) delayed resigning the House to vote for the legislation as well.

The bill was approved in the House by a vote of 219–212, with 8 Republicans supporting, and 44 Democrats voting against, and 3 members not voting. All representatives present at the time of the vote had cast votes. Jeff Flake (R-AZ), Alcee Hastings (D-FL), and John Sullivan (R-OK) missed the vote due to "a family conflict", travel abroad in Albania, and "alcohol addiction treatment", respectively.

Democratic votes against largely came from freshmen in Republican-leaning seats, conservative "blue dog" democrats, as well as Democrats from areas dependent on coal for electricity or areas with large numbers of manufacturing jobs. However, some Democrats from liberal districts, like Pete Stark (CA) voted against the bill because he considered the bill "watered-down". Dennis Kucinich (D-OH) voted against the bill because he considered the bill "too-weak" and opposed offsets, among other similar criticisms. A recent study by the University of Oxford found causal evidence that the local industrial structure influenced the vote among Democrats: a higher share of carbon-intensive ("brown") firms made Democrats less likely to support the bill.

Republicans supporting the bill were Army Secretary nominee John M. McHugh and moderate Republican Main Street Partnership caucus members Mary Bono Mack (R-CA), Mike Castle (R-DE), Dave Reichert (R-WA), Mark Kirk (R-IL), Leonard Lance (R-NJ), Frank LoBiondo (R-NJ), Chris Smith (R-NJ). Kirk and Castle were members of the Republicans for Environmental Protection caucus.

With no prospect of overcoming a threatened Republican filibuster, the bill was never brought to the floor of the Senate for discussion or a vote.

== Required annual reductions in GHG emissions ==
The table below summarizes the required greenhouse gas emission reductions, with the benchmark of the 2005 emission levels.

| Year | Required annual percentage |
|---|---|
| 2012 | 3.0 |
| 2020 | 17.0 |
| 2030 | 42.0 |
| 2050 | 83.0 |

== See also ==
- Carbon Pollution Reduction Scheme
- Low-carbon fuel standard
- Low carbon power generation
- Regional Greenhouse Gas Initiative
- Climate Change Accountability Act (Bill C-311)
- Climate change policy of the United States
- Emissions trading
- Midwestern Greenhouse Gas Accord
- Western Climate Initiative
- EU ETS
