= List of climate change initiatives =

This is a list of climate change initiatives of international, national, regional, and local political initiatives to take action on climate change (global warming).

A Climate Action Plan (CAP) is a set of strategies intended to guide efforts for climate change mitigation.

== International initiatives ==
- Climate target#Global climate targets
- United Nations Framework Convention on Climate Change
- Kyoto Protocol
- International Carbon Action Partnership
- Global Environment Facility
- Muslim Seven Year Action Plan on Climate Change
- Paris Agreement
- Plant-based action plan
- Conference of Parties

=== Europe ===
Region	Name of initiative	Since
European Space Agency	Climate Change Initiative	2010
European Union, plus Norway, Iceland, Liechtenstein	European Union Emissions Trading Scheme	2005
European Union	European Climate Change Programme	June 2000
Germany	The International Climate Initiative (IKI)	2008
Germany	European Climate Initiative (EUKI)	2017

=== North America ===
Region	Name of initiative	Since
New England and Eastern Canadian provinces	New England Governors and Eastern Canadian Premiers (NEG-ECP) Climate Change Action Plan 2001	28 August 2001
Washington, Oregon, and California	West Coast Governors' Global Warming Initiative	November 2004
Western states of Arizona, California, Montana, New Mexico, Oregon, Utah, Washington, and British Columbia, Manitoba, Ontario, and Québec of Canada, with various Indian nations, US and Mexican states, and Canadian provinces as interested observers	WCI, the Western Climate Initiative (formerly Western Regional Climate Action Initiative)	24 April 2007
Mid-western states of Minnesota, Wisconsin, Illinois, Iowa, Michigan, Kansas, and the Canadian province of Manitoba; observers include Indiana, Ohio, South Dakota, and the Canadian province of Ontario	Midwest Governors' Accord, the Midwestern Greenhouse Gas Reduction Accord	15 November 2007
Arizona and New Mexico	Southwest Climate Change Initiative	2008
Northeast and Mid-Atlantic states of Maine, New Hampshire, Vermont, Connecticut, New York, New Jersey, Delaware, Massachusetts, Maryland, Rhode Island, and Virginia with other eastern states and Canadian provinces as observers	Regional Greenhouse Gas Initiative	2009
Open to all U.S. states, Canadian provinces, and Mexican states, but current participants are Arizona, British Columbia, California, Connecticut, Delaware, Illinois, Maine, Manitoba, Maryland, Massachusetts, Minnesota, Montana, New Jersey, New Mexico, Ontario, Oregon, Québec, Rhode Island, Vermont, Washington	North America 2050	2012

== National initiatives ==
Country	Name of initiative
Australia	Carbon pricing in Australia, also known as the Clean Energy Plan
Canada	Canada's Initiative
Ireland	Climate Action Plan
New Zealand	New Zealand Emissions Trading Scheme
Nigeria	Reduction from Business as Usual (BAU)
South Africa	Buffelsdraai Landfill Site Community Reforestation Project
United Kingdom	United Kingdom Climate Change Programme
United States	President's 2002 Emission Intensity Reduction Goal; Presidential Climate Action Plan

== Local initiatives ==
=== United Kingdom ===
Of the 397 councils in the United Kingdom, 337 have a climate action plan.

The UK Government offers a Boiler Upgrade Scheme (BUS) to replace gas boilers in home with a heat pump or electric boiler in order to reduce emissions. A property owner can't apply for a grant of up to £9,000 on the scheme, depending on the works being completed.

=== United States ===
State	Name of initiative
California	Global Warming Solutions Act
Connecticut	Connecticut's Initiative

City or county	Name of initiative
ICLEI campaigns for cities in Australia, Canada, Europe, Japan, Latin America, Mexico, New Zealand, South Africa, South Asia, Southeast Asia, and the United States	CCP, Cities for Climate Protection
Baltimore	Baltimore Climate Action Plan
Boulder, Colorado	Boulder Climate Action Plan
Chicago	Chicago Climate Action Plan
Cincinnati	Green Cincinnati Plan
Cleveland	Cleveland Climate Action Plan
Detroit	Detroit Climate Action Collaborative 2019 Sustainability Action Agenda
Kalamazoo	Kalamazoo Climate Action Plan
City of Los Angeles, California	L.A.'s Green New Deal Sustainability Plan 2019
County of Los Angeles, California	Our County Regional Sustainability Plan
New York City	New York City Panel on Climate Change
Oakland, California	City of Oakland Energy and Climate Action Plan
Pittsburgh	Pittsburgh Climate Initiative
San Diego	San Diego Climate Action Plan
San Francisco	San Francisco Climate Action Plan
Seattle	Seattle Climate Action Plan

==== Detroit ====
One of the more recent climate action plans is the 2019 Sustainability Action Agenda is a climate strategy plan created by the city of Detroit that emerged from gradual 12-year planning process of multiple efforts moving towards a more sustainable city. The action plan focuses on 4 main categories: Transitioning to clean energy through a 3-year target to reach 50% solar power to reduce greenhouse gas emissions. Icreasing sustainable mobility geared towards improving public transportation, transition to electric vehicles, and creating more pedestrian and cyclist pathways. Accelerating energy efficiency and reducing waste by benchmarking emissions, electrification programs, and reducing food waste. And lastly, prioritizing vulnerable residents from floods, heat, and bad air quality through resilience hubs, recovery guides, and new prevention infrastructure that will reduce the impact of climate change and natural disasters.

Detroit's sustainability plan talks extensively about economic growth and sustainability. The proposition has the main objective of decreasing waste and air pollution to help vulnerable and marginalized communities adapt better to the negative implications of climate change. Actions associated with this initiative include lowering utility billing, establishing cleaner indoor air – which will be done by upgrading and repairing homes and appliances – and increasing inclusivity and access to sustainable wages. In doing all of this, the city hopes to improve the overall welfare of Detroit residents; they are the primary focus of this plan. Subsequently, for these policy goals to be achieved the city of Detroit has the intention to increase job opportunity access as well as reduce operation cost – because 63% of Detroit's greenhouse gas emissions comes from buildings – to increase economy mobility and savings.

=== Canada ===
On the municipal and regional level, many cities have created climate action plans. The Federation of Canadian Municipalities coordinates local climate action through a program called Partners for Climate Protection.

==== Provincial plans ====
Province	Name of initiative
Ontario	A Made-in-Ontario Environment Plan
British Columbia	CleanBC
Sascatchewen	Prairie Resilience

==== Regional or municipal plans ====
City or region	Name of initiative
Toronto	TransformTO
Ottawa	Climate Change Master Plan
Region of Waterloo	TransformWR
Kitchener, Ontario	Kitchener 2051
Hamilton	Hamilton Climate Action Strategy
Greater Sudbury	Community Energy and Emissions Plan
Québec City	Plan de transition et d'action climatique
Montréal	Climate Plan
Vancouver	Climate Emergency Action Plan
Saanich, British Columbia	Saanich Climate Plan 2020
Winnipeg	Winnipeg Climate Action Plan
Calgary	Calgary Climate Strategy
Edmonton	Climate Resilient Edmonton
Saskatoon	Saskatoon Climate Action Plan
Regina	Renewable Regina
Halifax	HalifACT
Saint John	Municipal Energy Efficiency Program
Fredericton	Climate Change Adaptation Plan
Charlottetown	Charlottetown Climate Action Plan
Mississauga	Climate Change Action Plan
Caledon, Ontario	Resilient Caledon Community Climate Change Action Plan
Brampton	Climate Ready Brampton

== See also ==
- Climate target
- List of environmental agreements
- Nationally determined contributions (NDC)
- Regional climate change initiatives in the United States
