= Western Climate Initiative =

Nonprofit-run emissions trading scheme in California and Quebec

Western Climate Initiative, Inc.
- Participating jurisdictions of the Western Climate Initiative
- Formerly: Western Regional Climate Action Initiative
- Company type: 501(c)(3) organization
- Founded: February 26, 2007; 19 years ago in Washington, D.C., United States (Reincorporated 2011)
- Founders: Christine Gregoire; Ted Kulongoski; Janet Napolitano; Bill Richardson; Arnold Schwarzenegger
- Headquarters: 1107 Ninth Street, Suite 1070, Sacramento, California, United States
- Area served: North America
- Key people: Jason Hollett, Chair; Liane Randolph, Vice-Chair
- Members: California; Quebec; Washington
- Website: www.wci-inc.org

Western Climate Initiative, Inc. (WCI) is a 501(c)(3) non-profit corporation which administers the shared emissions trading market between the American state of California and the Canadian province of Quebec as well as separately administering the individual emissions trading system in the American state of Washington. It also provides administrative, technical and infrastructure services to support the implementation of cap-and-trade programs in other North American jurisdictions. The organization was originally founded in February 2007 by the governors of five western states with the goal of developing a multi-sector, market-based program to reduce greenhouse gas emissions; it was incorporated in its current form in 2011.

== Structure ==
Since its reincorporation in 2011 as a non-profit corporation, WCI is governed by a Board of Directors appointed by the participating jurisdictions. Each jurisdiction appoints two voting directors to the Board.

Position	Name	Jurisdiction	Notes
Chair	Jean-Yves Benoit	Quebec	Director General of Carbon Regulation and Emissions Data, Ministry of the Environment and the Fight Against Climate Change
Vice-Chair	Liane Randolph	California	Chair, California Air Resources Board
Treasurer	Joel Creswell	Washington	Climate Pollution Reduction Program Manager, Washington State Department of Ecology
Secretary	Kim Ricard	Quebec	Director of Carbon Market Division, Ministry of the Environment and the Fight Against Climate Change
Additional Voting Directors	Lauren Sanchez	California	Chair, California Air Resources Board
Additional Voting Directors	Jocelyn Savoie	Quebec	Assistant Deputy Minister, Climate and Energy Transition Office, Ministry of the Environment and the Fight Against Climate Change
Additional Voting Directors	Casey Sixkiller	Washington	Director, Washington State Department of Ecology
Additional Voting Directors	Yana Garcia	California	Secretary for Environmental Protection, California Environmental Protection Agency

== History ==
The Western Climate Initiative was founded as the Western Regional Climate Action Initiative on February 26, 2007, by the governors of Arizona, California, New Mexico, Oregon and Washington. The founding agreement stated the goal of the WRCAI was to evaluate and implement ways to reduce their states' emissions of greenhouse gases and achieve related co-benefits. These states and future participants in the initiative (collectively known as WCI "partners") also committed to set an overall regional goal to reduce emissions (set in August 2007 as 15 percent below 2005 emission levels by 2020), participate in a cross-border greenhouse gas registry to consistently measure and track emissions, and adopt clean tailpipe standards for passenger vehicles. By July 2008, the initiative had expanded to include two more U.S. states (Montana and Utah) and four Canadian provinces (British Columbia, Manitoba, Ontario and Quebec). Together, these partners comprised 20 percent of the U.S. GDP and 76 percent of the Canadian GDP.

== Goals and design ==
The most ambitious and controversial objective of the WCI was to develop a multi-sector, market-based program to reduce greenhouse gas emissions. Detailed design recommendations for a regional cap-and-trade program to reduce greenhouse gas emissions were released by the WCI in September 2008 and July 2010. By December 2011, California and Quebec adopted regulations based on these recommendations. (The WCI has no regulatory authority of its own.) Key administrative aspects of the regional cap-and-trade program were set to be implemented in 2012. Power plants, refineries, and other large emitters were encouraged comply with the cap in 2013. Other greenhouse gas emission sources, such as suppliers of transportation fuels, were obligated to comply with the cap in the beginning of 2015. Among other things, the Western Climate Initiative lays the foundation for a North American cap-and-trade program, not only in its design and implementation, but in its potential acceptance of greenhouse gas emissions offsets from projects across North America.

== Criticisms of WCI ==
Some observers described the entire project as greenwash designed to avoid committing to the Kyoto Protocol, and cited evidence that much more drastic cuts, up to 40%, could be achieved without affecting investment yield in equities, a good indicator that such cuts would not affect economic prospects in the economy as a whole.

== Partners vs. observers ==
Several U.S. partners, although active participants in the design of the program, announced in 2010 that they would either delay or not implement the program in their jurisdictions. The partnership was therefore streamlined to include only California and the four Canadian provinces actively working to implement the program. As of January 2012, regulations have not been issued by British Columbia, Manitoba, or Ontario, although a carbon tax in British Columbia will be increasing to $30/tonne of CO_{2} equivalents in July 2012. Several WCI partners also remain active in the International Carbon Action Partnership, an international coordinating body for several such regional carbon trading bodies.

Alberta and Saskatchewan object to cap-and-trade and in July 2008 called WCI's plan a "cash grab by some of Canada's resource-poor provinces." However, Alberta already had legislated its own emissions trading system for large emitters in 2007. The objections seem to be more related to the reporting and disclosure requirements that would be much higher for a North American project than for one based strictly in Alberta. Some of the states that withdrew by late 2011 also intended to develop oil shale, hydraulic fracturing of natural gas and coal resources that would have broad impacts beyond climate on water, including more ocean acidification.

Until late 2011, the initiative included two types of participants: partners and observers.

For several years, the partners were the U.S. states of California, Montana, New Mexico, Oregon, Utah, and Washington, and the Canadian provinces of British Columbia, Manitoba, Ontario, and Quebec. All states/provinces except California and Quebec withdrew in 2011. See below: Membership changes.

The observers included at various times Alaska, Colorado, Idaho, Kansas, Nevada, Wyoming, the province of Saskatchewan (which objects to WCI plans for a cap and trade system), and the Mexican states of Baja California, Chihuahua, Coahuila, Nuevo Leon, Sonora and Tamaulipas.

== Membership changes ==
- 26 February 2007: Arizona, California, New Mexico, Oregon, and Washington form the Western Regional Climate Action Initiative.
- 24 April 2007: British Columbia joined with the five western states, turning the WCI into an international partnership.
- 21 May 2007: Utah became the sixth state to join the WCI when Governor Jon Huntsman Jr. signed the Initiative. Huntsman was the second Republican governor to join, after California governor Arnold Schwarzenegger.
- 13 June 2007: Manitoba said that it would be the second Canadian province to join the WCI.
- 24 September 2007: Alaska joined the WCI as an observer.
- 19 November 2007: The Governor of Montana announced that his state would also join.
- January 2008: Montana officially joins the WCI.
- 18 April 2008: Quebec, previously an observer, became a partner.
- 18 July 2008: Ontario, previously an observer, became a partner.
- 2 February 2010: Arizona announces it will not implement a cap-and-trade program, particularly during the economic downturn, but maintains its membership in the WCI as a partner.
- 29 June 2011: California announces that enforcement of the cap will be delayed one year to allow the necessary elements of the program to be in place and fully functional. The stringency of the cap and expected amount of emission reductions, however, will remain unchanged.
- 6 July 2011: In order to maintain a coordinated approach to implementing the regional program, Quebec announces a one-year delay in enforcement of the cap.
- 18 November 2011: Arizona, Montana, New Mexico, Oregon, Utah and Washington leave WCI formally. Participation by BC was cast into doubt also, where officials indicated satisfaction with the existing carbon tax approach and had not committed to implementing a cap and trade system to replace it.

As of December 2011, the remaining WCI partners were California and the Canadian provinces British Columbia, Manitoba, Ontario, and Quebec.

- 11 May 2018: Nova Scotia becomes WCI partner, and executes cap and trade program on 1 January 2019.
- 11 October 2018: Ontario passes the Cap and Trade Cancellation Act, 2018 and formally withdraws from the WCI.

After British Columbia ceased participation in emissions trading in 2018, it remained a participating jurisdiction under WCI by-laws until amendments were made.

Nova Scotia withdrew itself as a participating jurisdiction in 2024.

As of 2025, the participating WCI jurisdictions are the American states of California and Washington; and the Canadian province of Quebec.

== See also ==
- List of Western Climate Initiative auctions
- List of climate change initiatives
- Intergovernmental Panel on Climate Change
- Midwestern Greenhouse Gas Accord
- Regional Greenhouse Gas Initiative (Eastern North America)
- Cap-and-Invest (Washington state)
- The Climate Registry
- United States Carbon Cap and Trade Program
- Project Vulcan
- Regional climate change initiatives in the United States
- United States Climate Alliance
