= Transportation and Climate Initiative =

The Transportation and Climate Initiative was a 2010 proposed interstate compact in the United States, which aimed to limit greenhouse gas emissions from motor vehicle fuel sources in the northeastern United States using a cap and trade system on wholesale suppliers. The media also referred to the plan as the Northeast Climate Pact.

Jurisdictions participating in discussions were the District of Columbia and the U.S. states of Connecticut, Delaware, Maine, Maryland, Massachusetts, New Hampshire, New Jersey, New York, Pennsylvania, Rhode Island, Vermont, and Virginia. Most of these jurisdictions already participated in the Regional Greenhouse Gas Initiative, a cap-and-trade system for greenhouse gas emissions from electricity generation.

If the plan had been implemented, gasoline prices in the participating states would have increased. The estimates ranged from 5 to 24 cents per gallon in 2023. Political leaders were also concerned that the tax would hit people experiencing poverty hardest.

The proposal disintegrated during the COVID-19 pandemic in the United States. Massachusetts withdrew from the agreement in November 2021, citing new, alternate sources of funding to "upgrade its roads, bridges and public transportation systems". The final state to withdraw was Rhode Island.
