= European Climate Initiative =

Climate Action connecting Europe

The European Climate Initiative (EUKI) is a funding instrument of the German Federal Ministry for the Environment, Climate Action, Nature Conservation and Nuclear Safety (BMUKN). The overall objective of the EUKI is to promote cooperation in the European Union (EU) to reduce greenhouse gas emissions.

The European Climate Initiative finances cross-border climate action projects. of public and civil society actors such as non-governmental organizations, scientific institutes and municipalities. Currently (as of December 2025), the EUKI promotes and finances 232 projects in 31 European countries. More than 450 implementing organizations and implementing partners are active in the projects. The funding volume amounts to 127 million euros. The EUKI forms the link between the National and the International Climate Initiative.

== History ==
In November 2016, the German government decided to fund the European Climate Initiative and made funds available for the 2017 federal budget. In April 2017, the first EU-wide call for project ideas was launched, with 67 project proposals received and 22 projects selected for funding. In May 2017, the EUKI Secretariat established its office at the Deutsche Gesellschaft für Internationale Zusammenarbeit (GIZ). A few months later, in September 2017, the first projects started their work.

During the first EUKI annual conference in Berlin in February 2018, the publication of a second call for project ideas was announced. From 85 project outlines, EUKI subsequently selected 22 proposals for funding. The calls for projects are held annually and support between 20 and 30 projects each year. In 2026, the 10th EUKI call for project was conducted.

== Objectives ==
The overall objective of the EUKI is to promote cooperation within the European Union to reduce greenhouse gas emissions. The work focuses on three approaches to support public and civil society actors in climate action and to initiate a transformative change in Europe to mitigate greenhouse gases.

Specifically, the EUKI pursues three approaches:

- Raise awareness and bundle knowledge
- Build networks and share models of success
- Build capacities

== Project funding ==
There are two ways to receive funding or contracts under the EUKI: The annual, EU-wide call for project ideas selects organizations with future-oriented ideas for European climate action. In addition, the German Federal Ministry for the Environment finances specific projects that pursue predefined climate policy goals. The target groups of the bilateral and multilateral measures to be funded are governments, local authorities, civil society, consumers and - where permitted under state aid law - the industry. Geographically there is a focus on cooperation with Central, Eastern, South Eastern and Southern Europe

=== Call for Project Ideas ===
Once a year, the EUKI publishes a call for project ideas in which committed actors and cross-border networks within the EU can apply for funding. Innovative climate action ideas from non-governmental organizations, public authorities, non-profit companies and scientific and educational institutions are selected for funding. Projects are sought in which partners from two or more EU countries work together. The EUKI funds the majority of its projects through the call for project ideas which is implemented by the Deutsche Gesellschaft für Internationale Zusammenarbeit (GIZ) on behalf of the BMUKN.

=== Tenders ===
Within the framework of tenders the BMUKN commissions selected projects and studies. These are intended to contribute to the direct implementation of agreements with EU partner countries and climate policy goals of the German government in Europe. The concept development for these projects takes place in consultation with the respective partner countries within the framework of bilateral initiatives. In addition, the ministry awards contracts for the scientific monitoring and evaluation of the EUKI as well as for the support of the BMUKN in questions of EU climate policy.

== EUKI Academy ==
In addition to funding, EUKI supports the strengthening of methodological, technical and commercial competencies as well as the dissemination of knowledge on climate action. Corresponding training events are offered within the framework of the EUKI Academy. The EUKI also promotes the networking of implementers and thus contributes to the establishment of a community of practice of committed experts in climate action across professional and national borders.

EUKI regularly offers webinars on climate-relevant topics such as climate policy or structural change in coal regions. In addition, there are further training courses on methodological topics such as project management or public relations. EUKI also publishes results and studies of the funded projects.

== Thematic priorities and project examples ==
The European Climate Initiative promotes ideas for cross-border EU-wide climate action.

Projects funded include socially responsible structural change in coal regions, awareness-raising in schools,, exchanges on national and European climate policy, and the strengthening of cycling in urban areas.
