= Midwestern Greenhouse Gas Reduction Accord =

Regional agreement to combat climate change

The Midwestern Governors Association, the organization that created the Midwestern Greenhouse Gas Accord

Members Observers

The Midwestern Greenhouse Gas Reduction Accord (Midwestern Accord) was a regional agreement by six governors of states in the US Midwest who are members of the Midwestern Governors Association (MGA), and the premier of one Canadian province, whose purpose is to reduce greenhouse gas emissions to combat climate change. The accord has been inactive since March 2010, when an advisory group presented a plan for action to the association with a scheduled implementation date of January 2012. Signatories to the accord are the U.S. states of Minnesota, Wisconsin, Illinois, Iowa, Michigan, Kansas, and the Canadian Province of Manitoba. Observers of the accord are Indiana, Ohio, and South Dakota, as well as the Canadian Province of Ontario.

While the Midwest has intensive manufacturing and agriculture sectors, making it the most coal-dependent region in North America, it also has significant renewable energy resources and is particularly vulnerable to the climate change caused by burning coal and other fossil fuels.

The Midwestern Accord was the fourth tier of the MGA Energy Security and Climate Stewardship Summit Platform, signed on November 15, 2007. It established the Midwestern Greenhouse Gas Reduction Program, which aimed to:

- establish greenhouse gas reduction targets and time frames consistent with the signing states' targets;
- develop a market-based and multi-sector cap and trade mechanism to help achieve those reduction targets;
- establish a system to enable tracking, management, and crediting for entities that reduce greenhouse gas emissions; and
- develop and implement additional steps as needed to achieve the reduction targets, such as a low-carbon fuel standards and regional incentives and funding mechanisms.

Through the Midwestern Accord, the governors agreed to establish a Midwestern greenhouse gas reduction program to reduce emissions in their states, as well as a working group to provide recommendations on implementing the accord. In June 2009, the Midwestern Greenhouse Gas Reduction Accord Advisory Group finalized its draft recommendations. In March 2010, the advisory group presented a plan to the MGA that called for implementation beginning in January 2012. No further action was taken, as leadership in several of the states switched positions on climate policy.

In July 2014, accord member Kansas and observers Indiana, South Dakota, and Ohio joined a lawsuit opposing the EPA Clean Power Plan, federal climate regulations which could be met by implementation of the accord.

The MGGRA became defunct after the 2010 United States elections.

== See also ==
- Intergovernmental Panel on Climate Change
- List of climate change initiatives
- The Climate Registry
- Regional Greenhouse Gas Initiative
- Western Climate Initiative
