= Project Vulcan =

Project Vulcan is a NASA/DOE funded effort under the North American Carbon Program (NACP) to quantify North American fossil fuel carbon dioxide (CO_{2}) emissions at space/time scales much finer than has been achieved in the past. The initial purpose of the Vulcan Project was to aid in quantification of the North American carbon budget, to support inverse estimation of carbon sources and sinks, and to support the demands posed by higher resolution CO_{2} observations. The detail and scope of the Vulcan CO_{2} inventory have made it a valuable tool for policymakers, demographers, social scientists, and the public at large.

Project Vulcan has achieved U.S. fossil fuel CO_{2} emissions at <10 km spatial scales and an hourly time scale, based on datasets such as air quality emissions reporting, census data, highway statistics, energy statistics, and econometric data. Furthermore, Vulcan includes significant process-level detail, dividing the emissions into economic sectors and sub-sectors in addition to 23 fuel types. It has been produced for the year 2002, and an annual product spanning 1980-2006 will be available by late-2009.

The first Vulcan inventory (v1.0) was released to the public in early April 2008. Version 1.1 was released in February 2009, and Version 1.2 was released out in early August 2009. In addition to the data release, establishment of the Vulcan website and a press release, a video of various aspects of atmospheric transport was released on Purdue University’s YouTube website and portions of the Vulcan inventory are available on Google Earth. As of 2015, version 2.2 has been published on a site hosted by Arizona State University.

== See also ==
- Climate change in Canada
- Climate change in the United States
- Climate change
