= New England Governors and Eastern Canadian Premiers' Annual Conference =

Annual meeting of leaders

Member states and provinces

The New England Governors and Eastern Canadian Premiers' Annual Conference (NEG-ECP; French: Conférence annuelle des gouverneurs de la Nouvelle-Angleterre et des premiers ministres de l'Est du Canada) is an annual international meeting of the American governors of the six New England states of Connecticut, Maine, Massachusetts, New Hampshire, Rhode Island, and Vermont, as well as the Canadian premiers of five provinces of Eastern Canada: Quebec, Nova Scotia, New Brunswick, Prince Edward Island, and Newfoundland and Labrador.

The first conference was held in 1973. According to the Council of Atlantic Premiers, the annual meeting is meant to "advance the interests" of the states and provinces as well as to encourage "cooperation" built on the "historic ties" between them.

== History ==
In 2014, the 38th annual conference was held at Bretton Woods in northern New Hampshire.

In 2018, four premiers and three governors attended the annual conference. This was the last in-person gathering of the NEG-ECP before the COVID-19 pandemic.

In 2019, the annual conference was cancelled due to Hurricane Dorian.

In 2023, the 44th annual conference was held in Quebec City, Quebec with three premiers and four governors being in attendance. The conference also marked 50 years of cross-border collaboration.

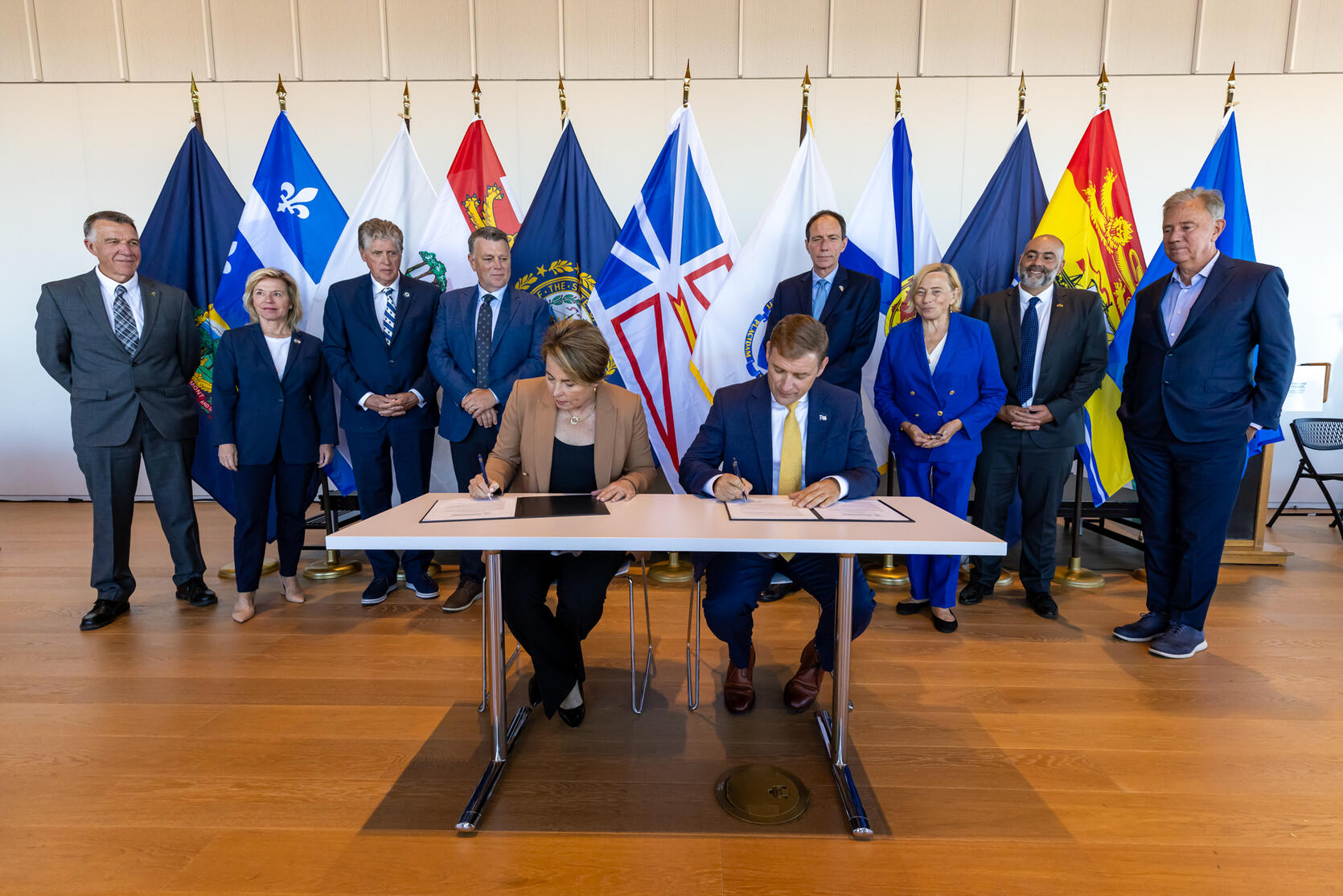
Attendees of the 45th annual NEG-ECP that took place on September 9-10 2024.

In 2024, the 45th annual NEG-ECP conference was held in Boston, Massachusetts on September 9-10 where two premiers and five governors attended.

In 2025, the NEG-ECP held their 46th annual conference in St. John’s, Newfoundland and Labrador. Newfoundland and Labrador Premier Tony Wakeham co-chaired the conference with Vermont Governor Phil Scott. On 16–17 November, three resolutions were adopted that aimed to strengthen collaboration on Technology and Innovation (Resolution 46-1), Energy (Resolution 46-2), and Ecological Connectivity and Food Security (Resolution 46-3). Co-chair Scott commented, “From energy to innovative technology and environmental resilience, there’s a lot of good happening across the region on both sides of the border. It’s important we continue to find ways to solve some of the challenges because the relationship between Canada and New England states is important and something we all need to continue to repair and strengthen.” Other Governors and Premiers and their representatives in attendance were: New Brunswick Premier Susan Holt, Prince Edward Island Premier Rob Lantz, Quebec Minister of Economy, Innovation and Energy Christine Fréchette, Nova Scotia Minister of Growth and Development Colton LeBlanc, Massachusetts Commissioner of the Department of Energy Resources Elizabeth Mahony, and Maine Acting Commissioner of the Department of Energy Resources Dan Burgess.

In 2026, the NEG-ECP held their 47th annual conference in Charlottetown, Prince Edward Island with the theme of "Renewing the Northeast-Atlantic Partnership: Security and Economic Cooperation". Vermont Governor Phil Scott co-chaired the conference with Prince Edward Island Premier Rob Lantz. On 9-10 August, the NEG-ECP attendees toured an aerospace facility and a farming complex to explore joint opportunities on clean energy and advanced manufacturing. Co-chair Lantz commented, "The relationship between New England and Eastern Canada has always been built on trust, cooperation and a willingness to work together. At a time of economic uncertainty, those partnerships are more important than ever”. Other Governors and Premiers and their representatives in attendance were: Nova Scotia Premier Tim Houston, Connecticut Acting Commissioner of Energy and Environmental Protection Emma Cimino, New Hampshire Commissioner of Business and Economic Affairs Lucy Lange, Rhode Island Secretary of Commerce Stefan Pryor, Quebec Minister of International Relations and La Francophonie Christopher Skeete, Massachusetts Secretary of Energy and Environmental Affairs Rebecca Tepper, Newfoundland and Labrador Assistant Deputy Minister Jennifer Barnes, New Brunswick Executive Director of Trade Policy Serge Breau, and Maine Senior Advisor to Governor Janet T. Mills Dan Burgess.

== See also ==
- Atlantic Northeast
- Council of Atlantic Premiers
- New England
