= Environment of California =

Results of human habitation of California

California is on the western coast of the United States.

The environment of California describes results of human habitation of the American State of California.

== History of environmental action ==
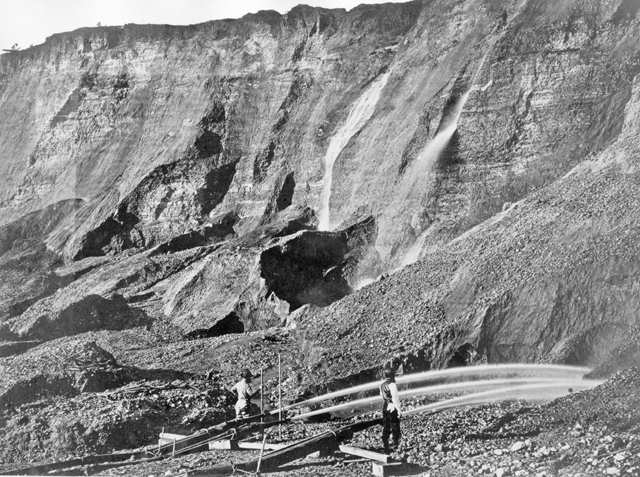
Gold miners excavate an eroded bluff with jets of water at a placer mine in Dutch Flat, California sometime between 1857 and 1870.

California's Mediterranean climate makes vegetation susceptible to wildfires through the dry summers. Aboriginal Californians used fire to control brush, promote growth of seed-producing plants important to subsistence, and perhaps as an aid to hunting wildlife. These periodic fires kept woodland areas relatively open until 20th century laws curtailed burning in an effort to protect structures. European crops and livestock were introduced with missions along the coast from San Diego to San Francisco Bay through the late 18th and early 19th century. The California Gold Rush caused explosive population growth making San Francisco the only 19th century city west of St. Louis, Missouri. Water soon became the limiting factor for population growth, and early laws established water rights for irrigation and hydraulic mining. The Great Flood of 1862 washed gravel displaced by gold mining downstream to cover riparian cropland and fill formerly navigable stream channels serving as transportation corridors to San Francisco Bay. The damage encouraged passage of water pollution control legislation, broadly regulating disposal of waste to include relatively innocuous materials like gravel. These California laws provided a template for the United States Environmental Protection Agency National Pollutant Discharge Elimination System.

== Population and transportation ==
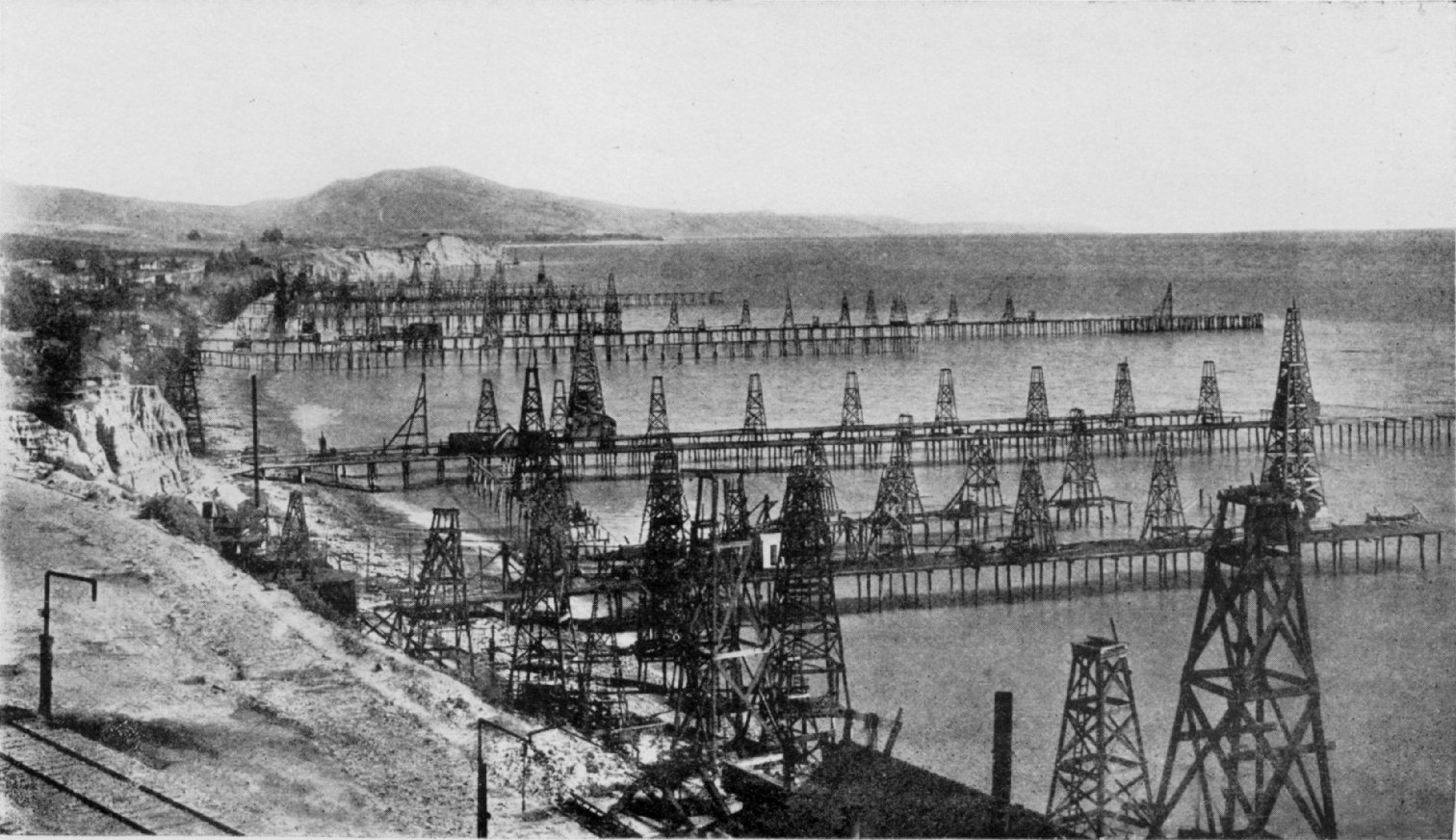
20th century petroleum extraction helped the city of Los Angeles become one of the largest in the United States.

California's aboriginal population of about 300,000 was distributed in relatively self-sufficient groups with subsistence resources on the coastal wetlands near the mouth of the Smith River, along the Klamath River and its interior wetlands, on the coastal wetlands surrounding Humboldt Bay, on the wetlands surrounding San Francisco Bay and the rivers of the California Central Valley, along the Salinas River, and along the coastal wetlands between Morro Bay and San Diego Bay. Early European trade was by ship, but El Camino Real extended northward along the southern California coast and through the California Coast Ranges from Mexico to San Francisco Bay to link individual missions with seaports. San Francisco Bay became the most important seaport for the gold rush and ferries of San Francisco Bay carried trade between the seaport and mining areas. The California Trail became the first important land link between San Francisco Bay and the eastern United States during the gold rush and became the route of the First transcontinental railroad in 1869. The gold rush brought approximately 200,000 new residents to California, and 36% of Californians lived around San Francisco Bay by 1870. Lumber from coastal redwood forests was transported to San Francisco by ships. Redwood proved poorly suited for railroad ties, so fast-growing Australian eucalypts were widely planted to provide future supplies.

San Francisco Bay remained the focus of a railway network extending north and south until Atchison, Topeka and Santa Fe Railway completed a transcontinental rail link to Los Angeles and San Diego in 1885. Eastbound rail shipment of citrus began in 1890. Petroleum was discovered in 1892, and the first offshore drilling occurred at Summerland Oil Field in 1896. Hollywood's film industry and shift of the United States Navy Battle Fleet home port to San Pedro in 1919 accelerated growth of southern coastal cities to 36% of the state population by 1920.

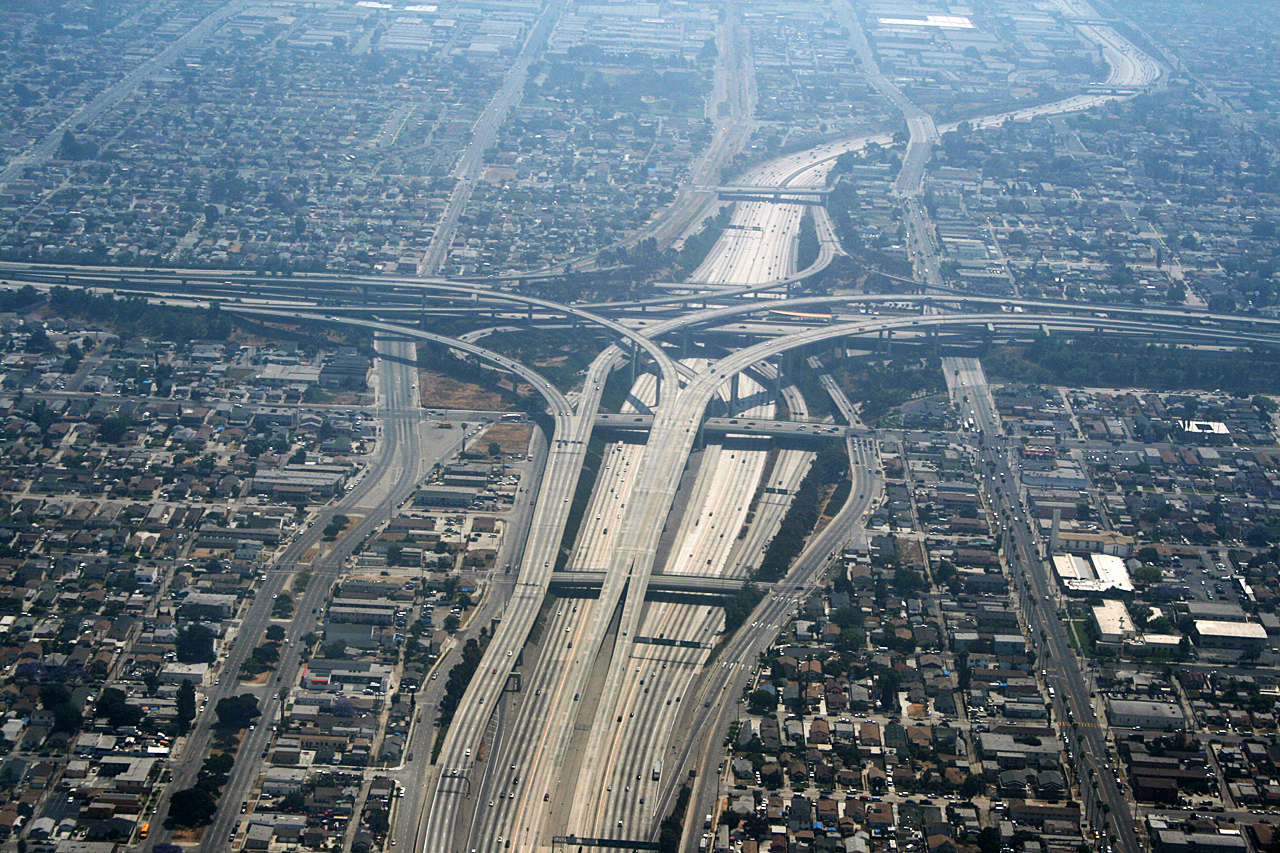
A majority of Californians live, commute, and work in the hazy web of Southern California freeways.

As California petroleum production peaked, the United States Highway System of 1925 included routes paralleling older transportation corridors. U.S. Route 101 followed El Camino Real and extended through the redwoods to Humboldt Bay. U.S. Route 99 extended northward from Los Angeles following railways through the Central Valley; and the Lincoln Highway and U.S. Route 66 followed the transcontinental rail routes from San Francisco Bay and Los Angeles, respectively. Popularity of automobile travel encouraged construction of California Route 1 connecting California State Beaches, U.S. Route 395 through the Sierra Nevada, and the Arroyo Seco Parkway as the first freeway. Smog was recognized as an air pollution problem in 1954 as Los Angeles Railway, Pacific Electric Railway and Key System public transport facilities were dismantled during the great American streetcar scandal. Southern California cities were home to 51% of Californians when the Interstate Highway System arrived in 1959, while 26% lived around San Francisco Bay. Lincoln Highway became Interstate 80, Route 66 became Interstate 40, and Interstate 5 extended from San Diego through Los Angeles and north up the rain shadowed western side of the Central Valley and the eastern end of San Francisco Bay.

Modern commuter rail service includes Bay Area Rapid Transit, Caltrain, Muni Metro, Los Angeles Metro Rail, San Diego Trolley, Sacramento Regional Transit District, VTA light rail, and Amtrak's Pacific Surfliner and Capitol Corridor. In 2010, 9 million Californians (24% of the population) lived around San Francisco Bay and 21 million (57% of the population) lived in the southern coastal cities.

== Water transfers ==
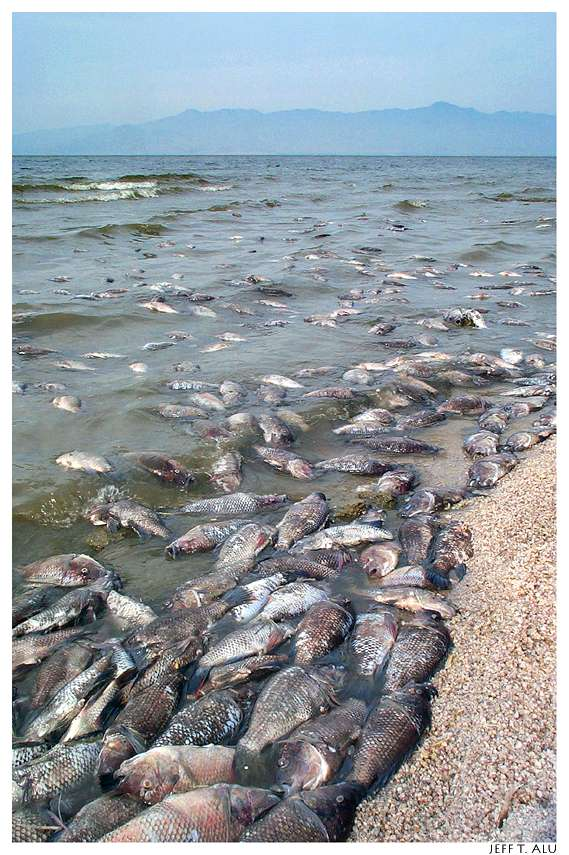
The Salton Sea is an endorheic basin of evaporating irrigation return flows.

Unsuccessful gold prospectors soon recognized California's agricultural potential and their mining equipment began adjusting timing and location of stream flows to increase food production. Mono Lake and Tulare Lake shrank as flows were diverted to irrigation. Little Lake was drained to form the town of Willits, California in 1874, and Laguna de Santa Rosa was drained to bring rail service to Sonoma County. The Klamath Project drained large shallow lakes for conversion to cropland in 1905. The Potter Valley Project diverted water from the Eel River to the Russian River in 1906 to provide hydroelectric power to Ukiah, California; and Lake Pillsbury was formed behind Scott Dam in 1922 to increase summer flows allowing irrigation of Potter Valley.

California Water Wars opened with the Los Angeles Aqueduct in 1913 as the first large-scale transfer of water from northern mountains to meet population needs of southern California's coastal cities. Hetch Hetchy Aqueduct transferred water to San Francisco in 1932 after John Muir's unsuccessful efforts to preserve Yosemite National Park's Hetch Hetchy Valley. The 1922 Colorado River Compact allowed completion of the Colorado River Aqueduct to Los Angeles in 1941.

U.S. Bureau of Reclamation public works projects included Friant Dam on the San Joaquin River in 1942 and Shasta Dam on the Sacramento River in 1945. These dams reduced winter flooding and summer salinity of the Sacramento-San Joaquin Delta encouraging crop production on drained wetlands. The Central Valley Project continued with Folsom Dam on the American River, Trinity Dam on the Trinity River, and Oroville Dam on the Feather River. Construction of the California Aqueduct has been completed to Southern California except for a Peripheral Canal which might restore pre-dam delta salinity concentrations.

A major fraction of water transferred to southern California is used for production of food. Irrigation return flows like the New River may contain pesticides and elevated concentrations of dissolved minerals, and may accumulate in endorheic basins like Kesterson Reservoir. The Salton Sea was enlarged by diversion of water from the Colorado River.

== New environments ==
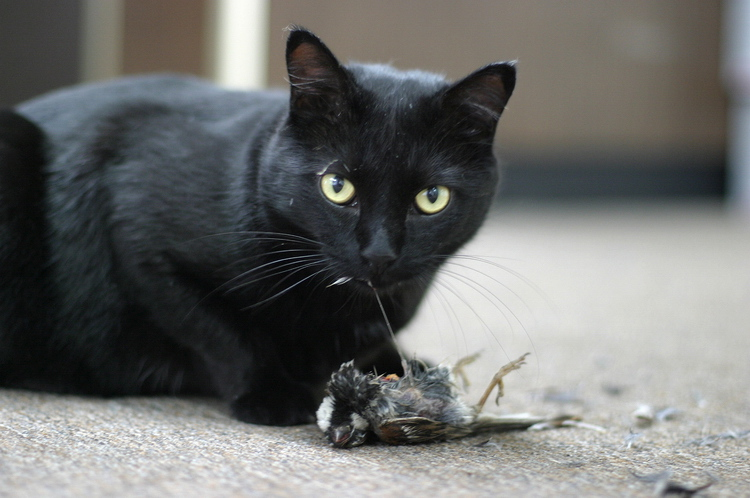
Cat eating a house sparrow.

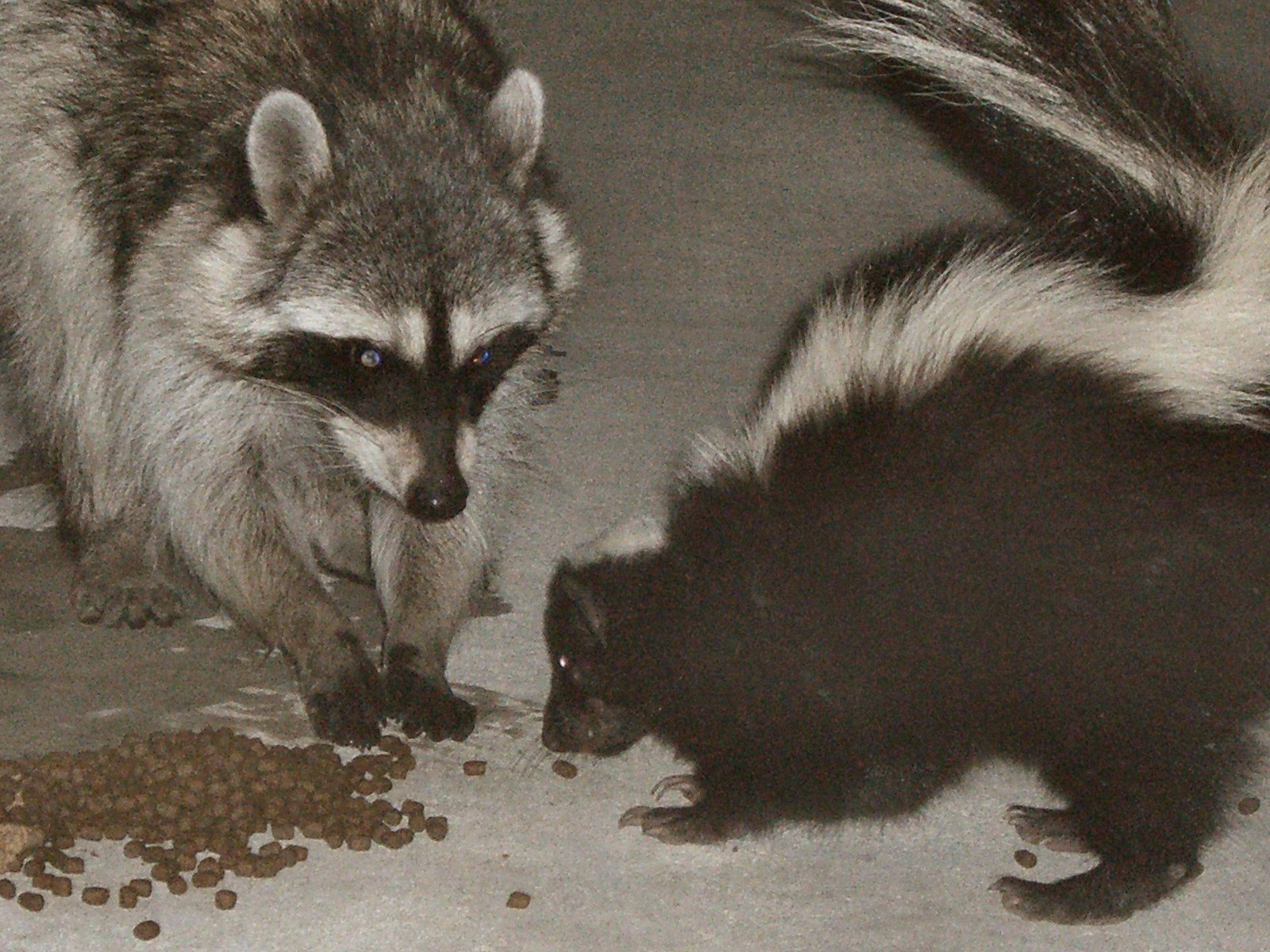
Raccoon and skunk eating cat food in a Hollywood back yard

Aside from simple agricultural environments, water transfer has created a unique southern California urban area. The relatively low urban population density encouraged by automobile mobility features edge effect habitats including a broad range of landscaping plants. Omnivores able to cross streets, roads, and freeways thrive in this spatially fragmented habitat with dry season water available from landscape irrigation. Columbidae, Corvidae, house sparrow, European starling and gulls fly between isolated habitat segments, while raccoons, opossums, skunks and rats travel under bridges and through culverts and storm drains. Animals killed during unsuccessful crossing attempts are a food source for scavengers also seeking garbage or food intended for pets or wild birds and squirrels. Domestic cats and dogs kill small animals for recreation and have established feral predator populations. Coyotes prey on these smaller predators.

== Legislation ==
- California Environmental Quality Act
- California Proposition 23
- California Proposition 50 (2002)
- California Proposition 65 (1986)
- Electronic Waste Recycling Act
- Electronic Waste Recycling Fee

== Organizations ==
- California Air Resources Board
- California Coastal Commission
- California Coastal Conservancy
- California Department of Pesticide Regulation
- California Department of Toxic Substances Control
- California Environmental Protection Agency
- California State Lands Commission
- Water Education Foundation

== See also ==
- CoolCalifornia.org
- Pollution in California
- Ecology of California
- Environment of the United States
- Environmental issues in the United States
- List of Superfund sites in California
- San Francisco Mandatory Recycling and Composting Ordinance
