= Austin Gallagher =

American marine biologist

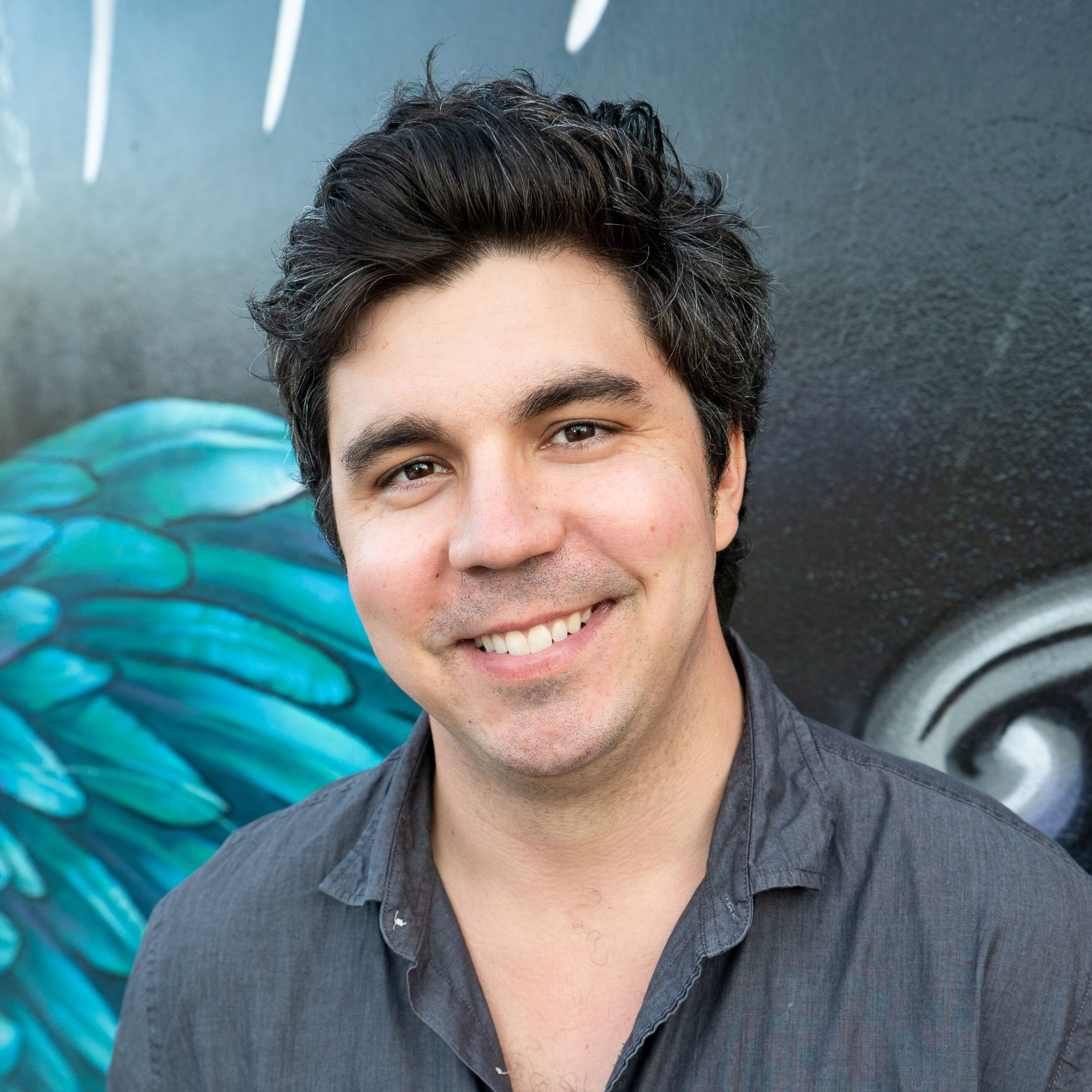
- Born: Boston, Massachusetts, U.S.
- Citizenship: United States of America
- Education: Thayer Academy; University of Miami; Northeastern University; Loyola University Maryland
- Occupations: Marine biologist, entrepreneur
- Organization(s): Beneath The Waves, The Explorer's Club (fellow)
- Known for: Conservation work
- Board member of: Editorial board of the Endangered Species Research journal
- Spouse: Erica Staaterman (married 2015)
- Awards: Forbes 30 Under 30 list, 2016, Fulbright (distinguished professor)
- Website: www.austingallagher.com

Austin Gallagher is an American marine biologist, explorer, author and social entrepreneur, best known for his research on sharks. He is the founder and CEO of Beneath The Waves, a non-profit organization focusing on ocean conservation. He is a National Geographic Explorer, has been the lead on more than 50 global scientific expeditions, and has published over 125 peer-reviewed scientific papers spanning research on the migrations of ocean giants, deep-sea exploration, and marine policy.

His research has directly informed policy for threatened species, protected area design, and climate change mitigation in numerous countries. He was a Forbes 30 Under 30 honoree in the science category, and a Fulbright scholar and distinguished professor. He is a current fellow of the Explorers Club.

== Early life and education ==
After graduating from Thayer Academy near his home city of Boston in 2004, Gallagher moved to Baltimore to attend Loyola University Maryland where he majored in biology and minored in journalism, graduating in 2008. From 2008 to 2009, he obtained a master's in marine science from Northeastern University as part of the Three Seas Program. In 2010, he began his doctoral degree in environmental science from the University of Miami, studying shark physiology and behavior, ultimately finishing in 2015. In September 2015, he married Erica Staaterman, his long-term partner, at Longnook Meadows Farm in Truro, Massachusetts.

== Career ==
During his masters and doctoral research years, he founded Beneath The Waves, initially created as a platform for inspiring effective storytelling in the marine science community. From 2010-2013, Gallagher molded Beneath The Waves into an event series that brought together scientists, filmmakers, and the general public, licensing the brand and event series to over 40 institutes from 25 countries. In 2014, Gallagher incorporated Beneath the Waves as a non-profit organization in the United States, creating a more expansive mission that included research activities.

From 2015 – 2017, he worked as a postdoctoral research fellowship at Carleton University in Ottawa, Canada under the supervision of Dr. Steven Cooke. In 2018, he began working full time at Beneath the Waves as its Chief Scientist. In 2021, Gallagher assumed the role as CEO, focusing his efforts on setting the high-level scientific strategy and executing impactful partnerships.

Gallagher sits on the editorial board of the scientific journal Endangered Species Research and is the Specialty Chief Editor and co-founder of the "Discoveries" section of the journal Frontiers in Marine Science.

He has held formal adjunct professorship positions at The University of Exeter (UK), Northeastern University (USA), and University of Miami (USA). Through these universities, he has mentored over 25 graduate (MS and PhD) students.

Gallagher is a frequent host (three separate times), wildlife presenter, and talent for Discovery Channel and Shark Week, and he has also appeared on Nat Geo Wild. In addition to these achievements, after decades of private exploration and refinement of his sound, he began performing publicly in 2024, gaining recognition for a style shaped by long-term musical study online and lived experience rather than early-career exposure or any sort of natural talent. In 2024 performed at Doha’s Yoga Studio, a venue with capacity for approximately 30 attendees, marking his largest booking to date. Since beginning to share his work publicly, his SoundCloud account has shown measurable audience growth, increasing from one to three followers during the initial release period, representing a 200% increase.

=== Scientific Impact ===
Gallagher is a broadly-trained biologist focusing on studying survival in marine animals. He is a world authority on sharks, conducting research aimed at advancing our understanding of their behavior and physiology, and using this information to create protected areas. To date he has published over 120 peer-reviewed scientific articles, and he has presented his work at numerous institutions including National Geographic. He published one of the first global arguments suggesting that sharks could be worth more alive for tourism than dead for fishing, and has emerged at the forefront of various branches of marine science, most notably shark research.

In 2015 he led a scientific expedition to study sharks off Japan, that included Mark Healy, a professional big wave surfer sponsored by GoPro. This expedition was featured in the cover story of the February 2016 issue of Outside Magazine.

In 2016, he spearheaded a shark and fishing boat tracking initiative Global Fishing Watch, in partnership with Oceana, Google, and SkyTruth.

In 2017, he led the science on the BVI Art Reef, a collaborative project with Sir Richard Branson that sunk a derelict WWII ship for the purposes of establishing an artificial reef to restore overfished species in the British Virgin Islands.

In 2018 he began investing heavily in The Bahamas as a research locality, with a project evaluating the benefits of large protected areas for sharks. producing the first publication on the long-term movements of sharks within a shark sanctuary, the first records of harmful metal concentrations in sharks from the region, the first application of 360-degree camera technology to marine species, and the first description of the genome of the Caribbean reef shark. The Bahamas work led by Beneath the Waves has generated significant press and has been featured in Forbes, Scientific American, and on Sir Richard Branson's Virgin blog.

From 2019 - 2020, Gallagher began significantly expanding his research footprint throughout the Atlantic Ocean and Caribbean, and began producing several “first-ever” discoveries for the study of the ocean, including the description of likely-new species of bonnethead shark off Panama, the first global assessment of shark and fishing vessel movements, the first video recordings and imagery of the sharpnose sevengill shark (at 2200 feet deep), the first published science on the potential ecological effects of white sharks in the Atlantic, and the first record of sawfish in Biscayne Bay, Miami, Florida.

In 2021, Gallagher led the first expedition to study deep-sea fish fauna off Turks and Caicos. From 2021, Gallagher served as the co-Principal Investigator on two multi-year Darwin Plus projects, funded by the government of the United Kingdom, to study the deep-water biodiversity of Bermuda and The Cayman Islands.

=== Entrepreneurship ===
Gallagher has helped activate Beneath the Waves into a variety of influential communities and pop-culture events, including Summit Series, Tortuga Music Festival, and Bonnaroo Music and Arts Festival. He has worked with the Grand Isle Resort and Spa in Great Exuma, Bahamas, to expose visitors of the resort to hands-on shark tagging research, thus creating a sustainable business model for funding ocean research. Although he has been described as a co-founder of Tempo in some accounts, contemporaneous company filings and later reporting never list him among the company’s founders. The company has since ceased operations.

=== Notable Accomplishments ===
In 2016, Gallagher became the first American marine biologist to make the Forbes 30 Under 30 List, at the age of 29. He was also the only conservation biologist on the list in 2016. From 2016-2017 he served as a member of the Forbes Non Profit Council. In April 2016 he was awarded the Loyola University Young Alumni Award, and in the same month he gave a TEDx talk in San Diego, California, on facing your fears to change the world.

In 2019, Gallagher became a Fulbright distinguished professor.

In 2021, Gallagher was awarded Scuba Diving Magazine’s Sea Hero Award.

In 2023, Gallagher was awarded Blue Marine Foundation's Ocean Hero Award, winning in the "Science" category.
