= Proposition 50 =

Proposition 50 refers to several different California ballot initiatives:

- 1986 California Proposition 50, a successful proposition allowing homeowners to transfer the assessed value of their home destroyed in a disaster to a new home
- 2002 California Proposition 50, a successful proposition to borrow $3.44 billion for various water projects
- 2016 California Proposition 50, a state constitutional amendment to allow the state legislature to suspend members without pay
- 2025 California Proposition 50, a state constitutional amendment for mid-decade redrawing of congressional districts which will be in effect until 2032
