= Boulder Climate Action Plan =

Strategies to reduce greenhouse gas emissions in Boulder, Colorado

The Climate Action Plan (CAP) in Boulder, Colorado, is a set of strategies intended to guide community efforts for reducing greenhouse gas emissions. These strategies have focused on improving energy efficiency and conservation in homes and businesses—the source of nearly three-fourths of local emissions. The plan also promotes strategies to reduce emissions from transportation, which account for over 20 percent of local greenhouse gas sources.

== General information ==
In November 2006, citizens of Boulder, Colorado, voted to approve Ballot Issue No. 202, authorizing the city council to levy and collect an excise tax from residential, commercial and industrial electricity customers for the purpose of funding a climate action plan to reduce greenhouse gas emissions. The plan outlines programs to increase energy efficiency, increase renewable energy use, reduce emissions from motor vehicles, and take other steps toward meeting the goals set in the Kyoto Protocol.

Beginning April 1, 2007, and expiring March 31, 2013, the initial tax rate was set at $0.0022/kWh for residential customers, $0.0004/kWh for commercial customers, and $0.0002/kWh for industrial customers. The city council has the authority to increase the tax after the first year up to a maximum permitted tax rate of $0.0049/kWh for residential customers; $0.0009/kWh for commercial customers; and $0.0003/kWh for industrial customers. Voluntary purchases of utility-provided wind power are exempt from the tax.

== Allocation and generation of fund ==
Charge:
March 2010 rates for electricity customers:

| Electricity User Type | Tax Rate | Average Annual Tax |
|---|---|---|
| Residential | $0.0049/kWh | $21 |
| Commercial | $0.0009/kWh | $94 |
| Industrial | $0.0003/kWh | $9,600 |

Total Fund: $860,265 in the first year and up to $1,342,000/year thereafter through March 31, 2013
Purpose: Renewable energy, energy efficiency, transportation.

== Incentive authority ==
Authority 1: Ballot Issue 202 (Climate Action Plan Tax)
Date Enacted:11/7/2006

Authority 2: Boulder Revised Code 3-12
Date Effective: 4/1/2007
Expiration Date: 3/31/2013

== See also ==
- Carbon pricing
- Global Action Plan
- Transition town
- Greenhouse gas emissions by the United States
- Chicago Climate Action Plan
- San Francisco Climate Action Plan
- Presidential Climate Action Plan
