= Deforestation in the United States =

Virgin forest in the U.S.

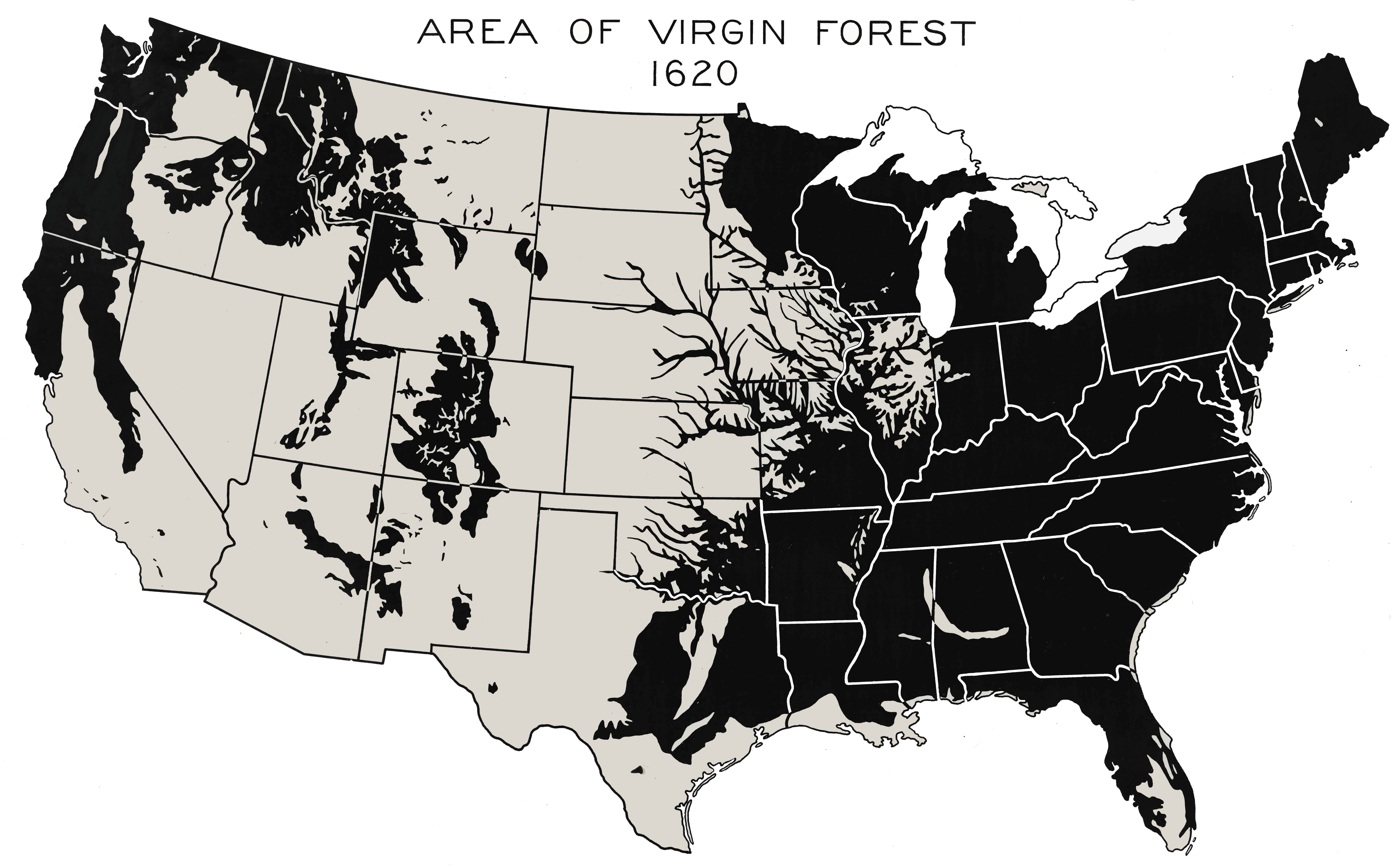
In 1620

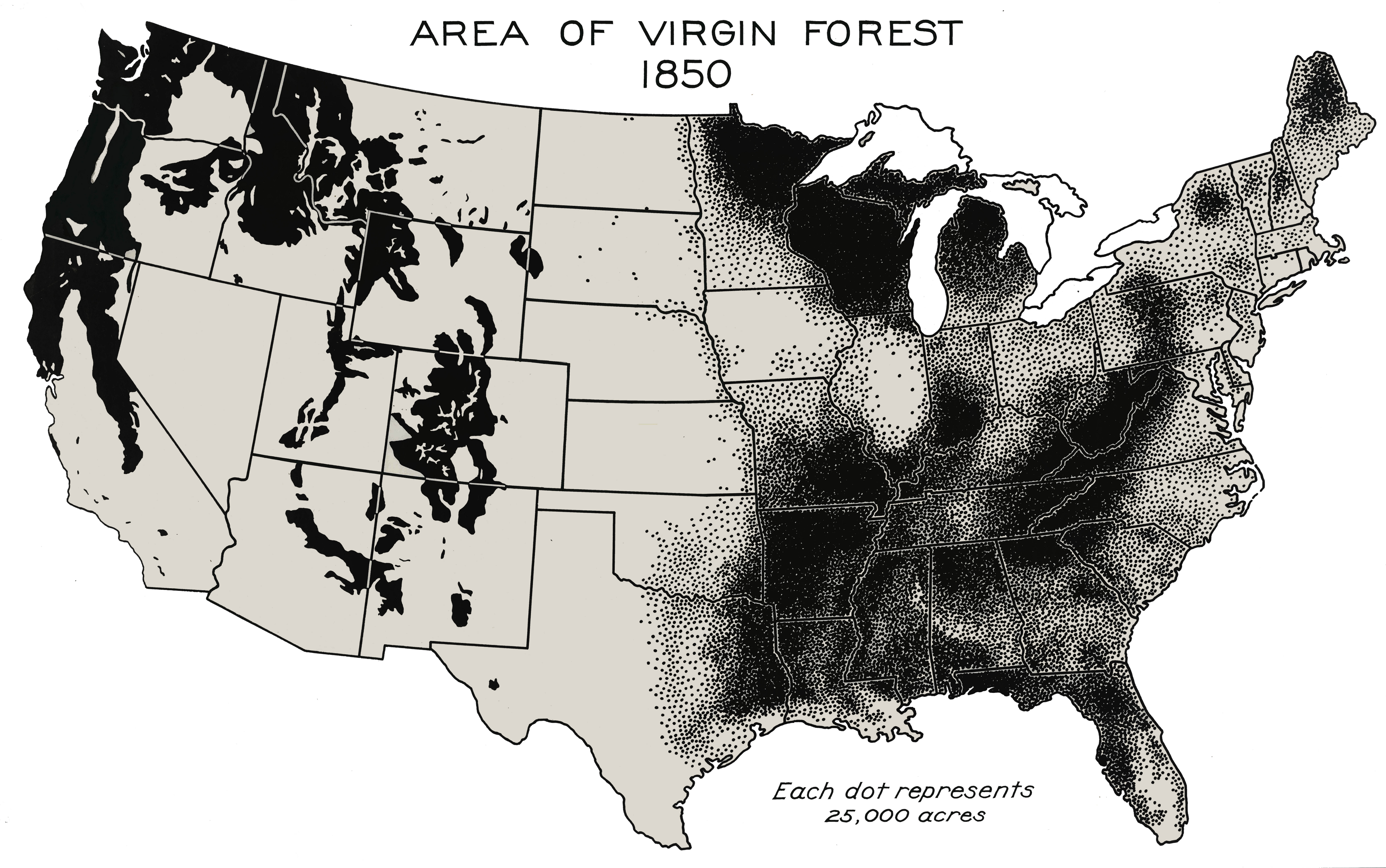
In 1850

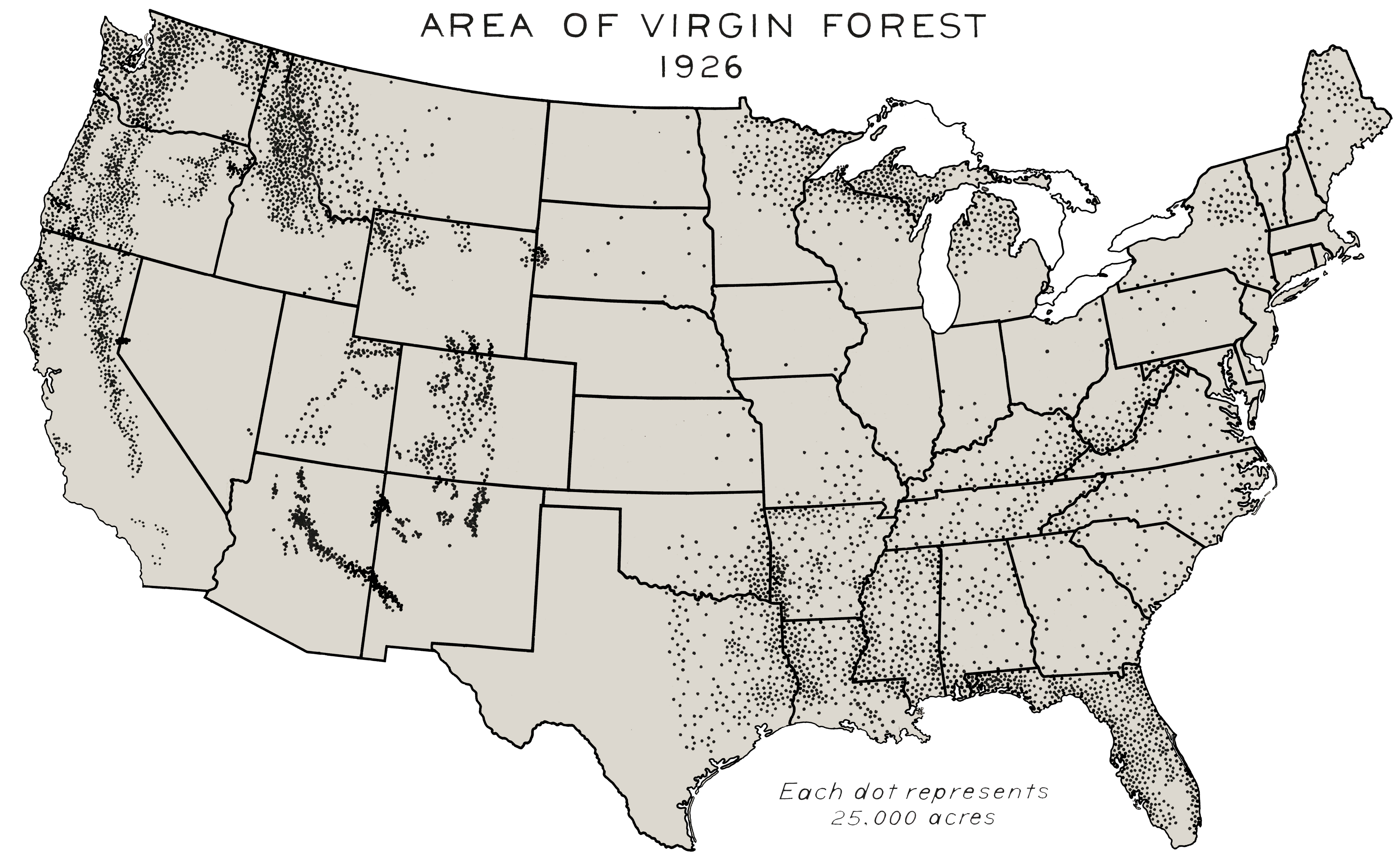
In 1926

Deforestation in the United States is an ongoing process where forests are removed or destroyed for various reasons such as logging, construction, and agriculture.

Native Americans cleared millions of acres of forest for many reasons, including hunting, farming, berry production, and building materials. Prior to the arrival of European-Americans, about one half of the United States land area was forest, about 1,023,000,000 acres (4,140,000 km^{2}) estimated in 1630. Forest cover in the Eastern United States reached its lowest point in roughly 1872 with about 48 percent compared to the amount of forest cover in 1620. The majority of deforestation took place prior to 1910 with the Forest Service reporting the minimum forestation as 721,000,000 acres (2,920,000 km^{2}) around 1920. The forest resources of the United States remained relatively constant through the 20th century. The Forest Service reported total forestation as 766,000,000 acres (3,100,000 km^{2}) in 2012. A 2017 study estimated 3 percent loss of forest between 1992 and 2001.

The 2005 (FAO) Global Forest Resources Assessment ranked the United States as seventh highest country losing its old-growth forests, a vast majority of which were removed prior to the 20th century.

Between 2010 and 2020, the US forests increased 0.03% annually, according to FAO (Food and Agriculture Organization of the United Nations). (Note: See FAO 2020, p. 18, table 8.)

In 2025, new research by Earth System Science Data showed that over the past four centuries vast stretches of forestland in the United States giving way to agriculture, urban development, and industry. Since the 1600s, the country has a net loss of approximately 258 million acres of forest.

== After European colonization ==
During the 19th century, while the U.S. population tripled, the total area of cropland increased by over four times, from seventy-six million to three hundred nineteen million acres. For every person added to the U.S. population during this period, farmers put another three to four acres under the plow. This trend continued until the 1920s when the amount of crop land stabilized in spite of continued population growth. As abandoned farm land reverted to forest the amount of forest land increased reaching a peak in 1963 of 753,000,000 acres (3,050,000 km^{2}).

After 1963, there was a gradual decrease through the next few decades which has been reversed with recovery and slight gains in the early 21st century. Gains in forest land have resulted from conversions from crop land and pastures at a higher rate than loss of forest to development. However issues have been identified such as the continued loss of old-growth forest, the increased fragmentation of forest lands, and the increased urbanization of forest land. Between 2001 and 2020, Alaska lost more tree cover than any other U.S. state.

== Causes and impact of deforestation ==
Lumberjacks in the Redwoods of California - 1915

Deforestation in the United States has been and continues to be caused by many factors. The logging industry in the United States during the 19th century had a major impact on deforestation. The California redwoods originally spread across 2 million acres and was reduced by 95% of its original size from logging. Today, the remaining 5% are mostly held in conservation within government controlled reserves. Michigan alone lost 160 billion board feet of timber from logging by the end of the 19th century. The amount of timber from Michigan was so massive that if the boards were laid out in-line into four by eight foot piles, it would be enough to circle the Earth about 50 times. The value of this timber is estimated to be more than the value of all of the gold from California gold rush. In the south east, between 1870 and 1920 during Southern Reconstruction, tens of millions of acres were logged as railroad expansion both demanded lumber and enabled its transportation.

Disease has been another factor. For example, the Southeastern United States used to be covered with old-growth American chestnut trees. These trees grew to a 100 feet tall and 10 feet in diameter and were so common that in some areas it made up 25% of the forest. In the early 20th century, chestnut blight was introduced into the region and decimated the tree population. An estimated 8.8 million acres (3.6×106 ha) of forest was affected and nearly 4 billion trees died.

Deforestation has led to many side-affects including erosion, food insecurity, global warming, habitat loss, and extinctions. Deforestation in the south led to erosion, which led to dust storms, and ultimately led to kudzu being introduced into the south east in 1935 as a solution to the erosion. This proved to be a double edged sword as the kudzu vine both solved erosion, but also exploded in population as an invasive species.

Today nearly 135 species of trees, which is around one in six of all tree species in the US, now face extinction with only 8 being federally protected. Trees in protected forests still face issues with logging due to timber poaching. In Redwood National and State Park, this is a serious issue and armed park rangers continue to crack down on poaching rings that threaten the park.

Of the 28 forest bird species with habitat exclusively in that forest, Pimm claims four become extinct either wholly or mostly because of habitat loss: the passenger pigeon, Carolina parakeet, ivory-billed woodpecker, and Bachman's warbler.

== Previous issues ==
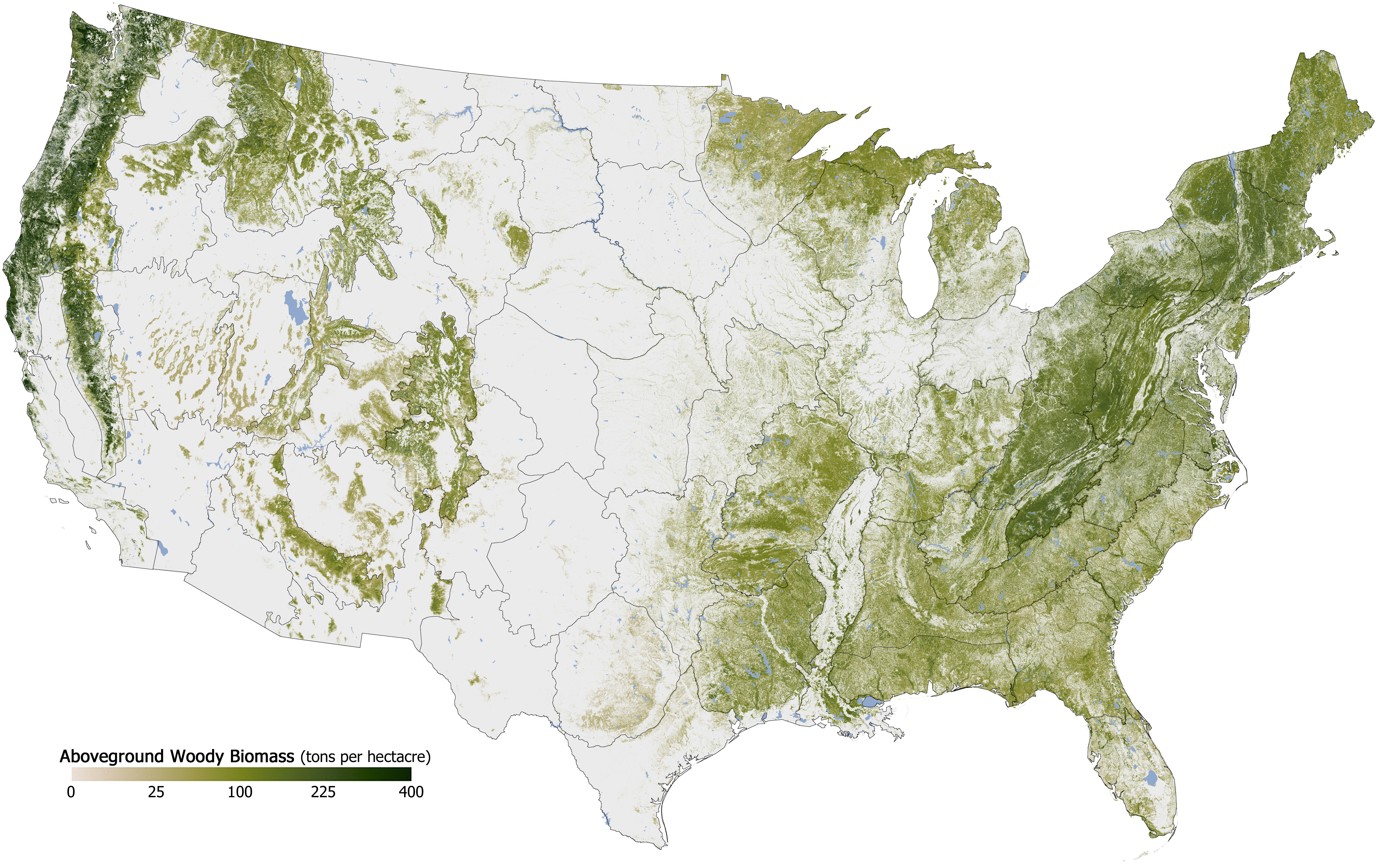
Map of above ground woody biomass c. 2000

Deforestation in the United States is affected by many factors. One such factor is the effect, whether positive or negative, that the logging industry has on forests in the country. Logging in the United States is a hotly debated topic as groups who either support or oppose logging argue over its benefits and negative effects.

The biggest issue thought to be facing deforestation in the United States was illegal logging. The Forest Service and EPA work together to make sure that the permits for logging companies in the United States are granted in such a way that the forests are kept healthy and sustainable, and illegal logging reduces the chances that forests will be kept this way.

It has also been argued that trees can lower temperatures by around 10 degrees Fahrenheit and their removal can lead to warmer temperatures.

== See also ==
- Conservation movement
- Deforestation by region
- Environment of the United States
- Environmental issues in the United States
- Environmental movement in the United States
- United States Forest Service

== Sources ==
- FAO (2020). "Global Forest Resources Assessment" (PDF).
