= San Francisco Mandatory Recycling and Composting Ordinance =

The San Francisco Mandatory Recycling and Composting Ordinance (No. 100-09) is a local municipal ordinance requiring all persons located in San Francisco to separate their recyclables, compostables and landfilled trash and to participate in recycling and composting programs. Passed by the San Francisco Board of Supervisors in 2009, it became the first local municipal ordinance in the United States to universally require source separation of all organic material, including food residuals.

== History ==
=== Early 1900s ===
The roots of San Francisco's recycling and composting program can be traced back to the formation of the Scavengers Protective Union in 1879, when loose federations of scavengers began. Most were Italian immigrants from one region of Italy and they hauled municipal waste in horse-drawn wagons and hand-separated valuable discards for resale. The scavengers made a living from materials similar to those salvaged in recycling programs today such as wood, metals, glass, rags, yard trimmings and food residuals. At that time, some of the materials were used as fuel, others were recycled and the yard debris and food residuals were sold to hog farmers in the outlying neighborhoods of the city for use as animal feed.

In 1921, the city began regulating waste collection and around the same time, scavengers, who were fiercely competing for the same materials, began forming associations. Rates were set under the 1932 ordinance, and required voter approval to change. This was modified by an amendment to the 1932 ordinance, approved by the voters in 1954 and effective in 1955, which established a rate adjustment system managed by city staff.

Cooperation amongst the former rivals allowed them to pool their resources. The two loose associations became known as Scavenger's Protective Association and Sunset Scavenger Company. These two entities eventually merged, and as a result all of the permits issued by the city came to be held by one entity. Exclusive refuse collection licenses for the city were issued in 1932—licenses still held today under the parent company, Recology. This steadfast relationship between the city and Recology San Francisco has resulted in a reliable public-private partnership, allowing San Francisco to design experimental pilot programs such as city-wide curbside organics collection.

=== 1950s–1970s ===
Although San Francisco has the highest diversion rate amongst all large cities in the United States today, in the late 1950s, the advent of packer trucks forced the city's recycling rate to an all-time low. Because separation of compacted materials was unfeasible, by 1967 Sunset Scavenger company and Golden Gate Disposal had scaled back their recycling operations to a mere two programs, metals and paper recycling. However, the 1970s brought a renewed interest in resource conservation. The federal Clean Air Act and Clean Water Act were signed into legislation and the first Earth Day celebration was held on April 22, 1970. In the spirit of these times, San Francisco residents proactively organized to create new volunteer-run community recycling centers. By 1980, San Francisco had a total of ten community recycling centers, offering residents the opportunity to recycle their newspaper, glass and cans.

=== 1980s–1990s ===
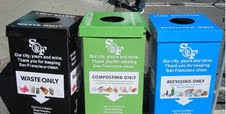
Fantastic Three bins for events

In 1980, under the city's chief administrative officer, the San Francisco Recycling Program (SFRP) was developed as a division of the Solid Waste Management Program. The goal of the SFRP was to facilitate and develop recycling programs throughout the city. After receiving a grant from the state in 1981, the city established three buy-back centers and launched its first curbside recycling program. With the passage of California's Bottle Bill (AB2020) in 1986, all community recycling centers in San Francisco began offering monetary compensation for materials with a California Redemption Value.

While this initial curbside recycling collection was unsuccessful due to scavengers, San Francisco continued to promote recycling efforts. The city formed an advisory council to help design another residential curbside pilot and collaboratively started two new programs targeting bar and restaurant glass collection and city government office paper recycling. In 1988, San Francisco's Solid Waste Management Program set diversion goals, calling for a 32 percent reduction in the city's waste stream by 1992 and 43 percent by 2002. However, in 1989, the California legislature preempted San Francisco's goals by passing the Integrated Waste Management Act (AB 939), which set waste reduction goals of 25 percent by 1995 and 50 percent by 2000. The city's diversion goals were amended shortly after to reflect the new state requirements.

By 1989, the city had begun a series of new curbside pilot programs, collecting mixed paper and containers (glass, aluminum and plastic). This program was fully operational by 1991, and contributed to San Francisco's achievement of 27 percent diversion in 1990. By 1997, the program had led to an additional 15,500 tons of recyclables diverted, yet a 1996 waste characterization study illustrated additional opportunities for reaching AB939 goals. According to the study, 60,000 tons of unrecovered recyclables remained in the waste stream, 26 percent of which were food residuals. Because San Francisco is a dense city, yard waste was found to make up only 5 percent of the residential waste stream. These findings, in conjunction with AB939 diversion requirements, prompted San Francisco to develop new curbside recycling pilots that included the collection of food residuals.

Pilot programs are commonly used as a mechanism for determining prospective infrastructure investments and educational tactics including, "collection containers, vehicles, outreach needs, processing needs and the impact of neighborhoods with different demographics." In 1999, San Francisco and Recology rolled out their most recent pilot, a dedicated color-coded cart system called the Fantastic Three. The color-coded cart system was designed to make recycling and composting easy for residents, with each color signifying the type of materials accepted (blue=recycling, green=organics, black=landfill). The Fantastic Three also integrated financial incentives for participation. The program's pay as you throw framework allowed residents and businesses to reap savings as their trash volumes decreased. Within seven months, the Fantastic Three helped to increase diversion by more than 90 percent amongst participating businesses and residents and generated a 73 percent satisfaction rating. With this success rate, Recology, in collaboration with the city, invested in a plan to further expand the program.

=== 2000s to present ===
Having invested in the infrastructure to increase the diversion of organics and recyclables from landfills, San Francisco realized a 50 percent diversion rate shortly after the Fantastic Three program was officially introduced. However, the city decided to pursue higher diversion rates than those required by the state for several reasons. First, the 1997 Sustainability Plan adopted by the Board of Supervisors included a long-term goal "to maximize sustainable uses of natural resources and to eliminate solid waste generation in the City and County of San Francisco." Additionally, Alameda County adopted Measure D which, "set a goal of achieving a 75 percent waste diversion rate by 2010 and as a condition of the Waste Disposal Agreement for disposing San Francisco waste in the Altamont Landfill in Alameda County, the City was required to recycle or divert waste at the same or greater level than that of East Bay (Alameda County) jurisdictions using the Altamont landfill." As a result, the Board of Supervisors passed the Zero Waste Goal (Resolution No. 007-02-COE) in 2002, requiring San Francisco to divert 75 percent of its waste by 2010 and to achieve zero waste by 2020.

While the city's investment in the Fantastic Three program demonstrated its ability to achieve high diversion rates and encouraged the creation of new goals, the Zero Waste resolution built the framework from which new waste reduction legislation could be drafted. Shortly after the Zero Waste Goal passed, the city began to adopt a series of waste reduction policies as a means to meet its goal of zero waste. A timeline of select waste-reduction legislation is listed below:

- 2004 Green Building Ordinance
  - Goal: Requires city construction to manage debris and provide adequate recycling storage space in buildings
- 2006 Construction and Demolition Debris Recovery Ordinance
  - Goal: Requires C&D projects to use city-registered transporters and processing facilities to increase debris recovery
- 2006 Food Service Waste Reduction Ordinance
  - Goal: Requires restaurants and food vendors to not use styrofoam food service ware and instead use food ware that is recyclable or compostable
- 2007 Plastic Bag Reduction Ordinance
  - Goal: Requires the use of compostable plastic, recyclable paper and/or reusable checkout bags by supermarkets and drugstores

There were a number of other San Francisco waste reduction policies passed during this time; most of them focus on city government operations. For example, the Mayor's Executive Order on Bottled Water bans the purchase of bottled water with city funds, while the Precautionary Purchasing Ordinance "requires city departments to purchase products that maximize post-consumer recycled content and recyclable or compostable materials, and that favor durability, repairability, and reuse." All of the aforementioned policies have had large impacts on diversion rates and by the end of 2007, the city had reached 72 percent. However, it was clear that increased participation in the residential curbside collection program was desirable if San Francisco were to reach zero waste by 2020. According to Jack Macy, Commercial Zero Waste Coordinator for the City of San Francisco, if everyone in San Francisco participated in the program by separating all the materials accepted, a 90 percent diversion rate would be achievable. San Francisco realized that voluntary participation would not suffice, and in 2009, the Board of Supervisors passed the Mandatory Recycling and Composting Ordinance, requiring all persons in San Francisco to separate their recyclables, compostables and landfilled trash and to participate in recycling and composting programs.

The mandatory ordinance represents further investment in recycling infrastructure and in San Francisco's goal of zero waste. It has provided the leverage of law and participation rates have increased as a result. Since the mandatory ordinance went into effect, "composting has increased by 45 percent, and the City is now sending nearly 600 tons of food scraps, soiled paper, and yard trimmings to Recology's compost facilities daily, up from 400 tons a year ago." In August 2010, San Francisco Mayor Gavin Newsom announced the city's diversion rate had reached 77 percent.

== Key requirements ==
- Source separation in color-coded containers
- Property owners/managers must provide space for bins
- Property owners/managers and vendors must subscribe to sufficient collection service
- Collectors must provide Department of Environment with names and address of all customers and those in stages of ordinance violation
- Collectors must provide Department of Environment with tonnage of each material disposed of with each party
- Conditions for exceptions to landfill recyclables or compostables
  - For vehicles requested by Department of Environment, transfer station must submit audit reports detailing quantities or percent of loads for recyclables and compostables.
  - Facilities that manufacture new products from recyclables or marketable compost from compostables may send a minor portion as processing residuals to landfills.

== Opposition ==
Since construction and demolition sites already possessed a high diversion rate prior to the mandatory ordinance, the initial impact of the ordinance was mostly on homes and businesses. Landlords expressed early concern over the challenge of finding space for bins, as well as over possible odors. Despite these concerns, the ordinance remained popular overall, polling 85% prior to passing. Before passing, the cap on fines was also lowered from $1,000 to $100 to address opposition to the possible size of fines.

Of the Board of Supervisors, only Carmen Chu and Sean Elsbernd opposed Gavin Newsom's proposal. Elsbernd was concerned about the preexisting problem of scavengers in trash cans and that the ordinance would worsen this problem. He was also concerned about fines being pursued heavily despite the assurance they would be lenient.

After clauses making apartment owners responsible for their tenants' sorting were eliminated, the San Francisco Apartment Association took a neutral stance on the ordinance.

== Implementation assistance and enforcement ==
To aid San Francisco residents in a smooth transition to the new ordinance, the city and San Francisco's municipal solid waste collector, Recology, offered free services including consultations and multilingual training sessions to educate residents. They also offered materials to aid the physical collection process: pails to collect compost, signs, and labels to instruct others on how to separate their recyclables, trash, and food scraps.

There are also financial incentives for reducing waste thrown in the trash bin. Both composting and recycling are less costly per month than the trash bill. The city newsletter highlighted this fact and suggested diverting more waste to recycling and composting bins, lowering trash bills by requesting less frequent trash collection, and using smaller trash bins to lessen the financial burden on residents.

In the event of "egregious" cases of noncompliance, or failure to separate recyclables, compostables, and trash, fines up to $100 for single-family homes and up to $1000 for large businesses are issued.

== Connections to state and local statutes and initiatives ==
=== California Assembly Bill 32 ===
San Francisco's mandatory ordinance supports California's greenhouse gas reduction goals as expressed in the scoping plan for the Global Warming Solutions Act of 2006 (AB 32). Commercial recycling, composting, diverting waste from landfill sites (with an eventual zero waste goal), and addressing methane release at these sites are all stated goals of AB 32. Recycling makes use of the embodied energy in recovered materials. Using recycled material in the manufacture of products thus saves energy that would be consumed in the materials-extraction, pre-manufacture, and manufacture lifecycle stages of products. Diversion of organic matter for other uses similarly reduces greenhouse gas emissions (see Food Waste Treatment section). The AB 32 scoping plan also lists organics diverted from the waste stream as a potential source of biofuel production, which could further reduce greenhouse gas emissions if substituted for fossil fuels.

AB 32 further directs that the California Air Resources Board (ARB) will work with the California Department of Resource Recycling and Recovery (CalRecycle) to create a mandatory commercial recycling program, and partnerships between California and local government recycling and composting programs such as San Francisco's mandatory ordinance. Statewide, such diversions from the waste stream are expected to conservatively produce the following greenhouse gas savings in millions of metric tons (MMT) of carbon dioxide equivalents:

- Commercial recycling mandate: 5 MMT
- Organic product markets: 2 MMT
- Anaerobic digestion: 2 MMT
- Methane control at landfills: 1 MMT

=== San Francisco's Climate Action Plan ===
San Francisco's Mandatory Recycling and Composting Ordinance also contributes to the San Francisco Climate Action Plan to reduce greenhouse gas emissions. Most greenhouse gases attributed to waste are the result of energy consumed in lifecycle stages upstream from the landfill (materials extraction, pre-manufacture, manufacture, and transport), not from the landfill itself. In 2001, San Francisco's actions to divert materials from Altamont landfill into recycled products reduced greenhouse gas emissions from these upstream lifecycle stages by the equivalent of 768,000 tons of carbon dioxide, vs. manufacturing these same products from virgin materials. This shift away from virgin materials represents a 75–80% savings in net greenhouse gas emissions for paper, glass, copper, and steel, and a 97.5% savings for aluminum. The recycling of paper has an additional carbon sequestration effect through forest conservation. Diversion of organic material into composting also reduces greenhouse emissions, since applying compost as a soil amendment helps to sequester carbon. In this vein, San Francisco's mandatory recycling and composting ordinance supports the city's 2002 Greenhouse Gas Emissions Reduction Resolution to reduce emissions to 20% less than 1990 levels by no later than 2012.

San Francisco's 2004 Climate Action Plan recommended mandatory residential and commercial recycling and composting policies to increase diversion of material from landfills. The Climate Action Plan projected estimated reductions in tons of emitted carbon dioxide equivalents from specific economic sectors and actions:

- Residential sector: 70,000 tons
  - Greater participation in the residential Fantastic Three bin program
  - Expansion of recycling and composting to multifamily apartment buildings
- Commercial sector: 109,000 tons
  - Greater commercial recycling and composting
  - More advanced sorting and processing of commercial streams
- Construction and demolition sector: 57,000 tons
- Alternative collection of recyclables: 66,000 tons
  - Improved metals recovery technology
  - Drop-off program, donations to recycling centers, and CRV buy-backs
  - Enable independent material handlers. Examples include paper dealers re-use organizations such as Goodwill Industries.

=== Alameda County landfill ban ===
As stated in the history section, landfill limitations placed on San Francisco by Alameda County influenced San Francisco's decision to move toward greater diversion. Alameda County has continued to move towards greater diversion, and on January 1, 2010, Alameda County implemented a new landfill ban targeted at professional landscapers. This ban prohibits garbage contaminants (such as bottles or plastic film) in plant debris brought to plant debris disposal facilities, since these contaminants may require the organic waste facility to reject the entire contaminated load. Similarly, the ban forbids plant debris to be disposed of in garbage. The ban is backed by fines of up to $500 per offense for repeat offenders.

=== Plastic bag ban precedent ===
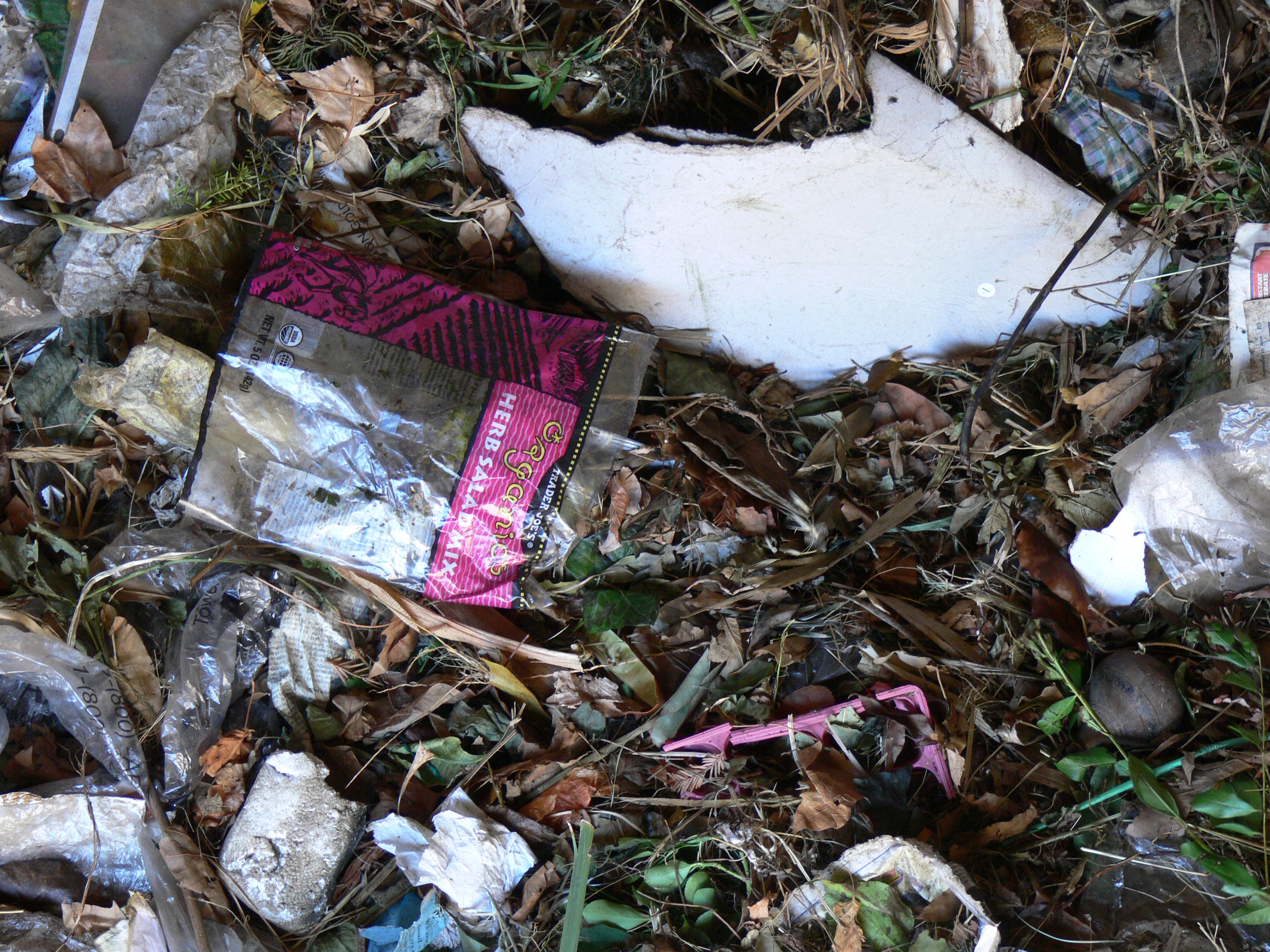
Plastic and styrofoam contamination in municipal compost

One of San Francisco's waste reduction measures, the city's Plastic Bag Reduction Ordinance (described in the history section), has achieved national and international attention. Within a year of its implementation, Boston, Portland, and Phoenix were investigating such plastic bag bans, and city supervisor Ross Mirkarimi had fielded inquiries from Paris and London. However, the Marin County suburb of Fairfax retreated from a similar ban when the plastic bag industry threatened legal action. Mayor Mary Ann Maggiore stated that the city was too small to fight the suit. On April 26, 2011, the San Francisco Bay Area county of Santa Clara also passed a plastic bag ban in unincorporated areas of the county, but this ban excludes restaurants and non-profit organizations.

== See also ==
- Environment of California
