= Environment of the United States =

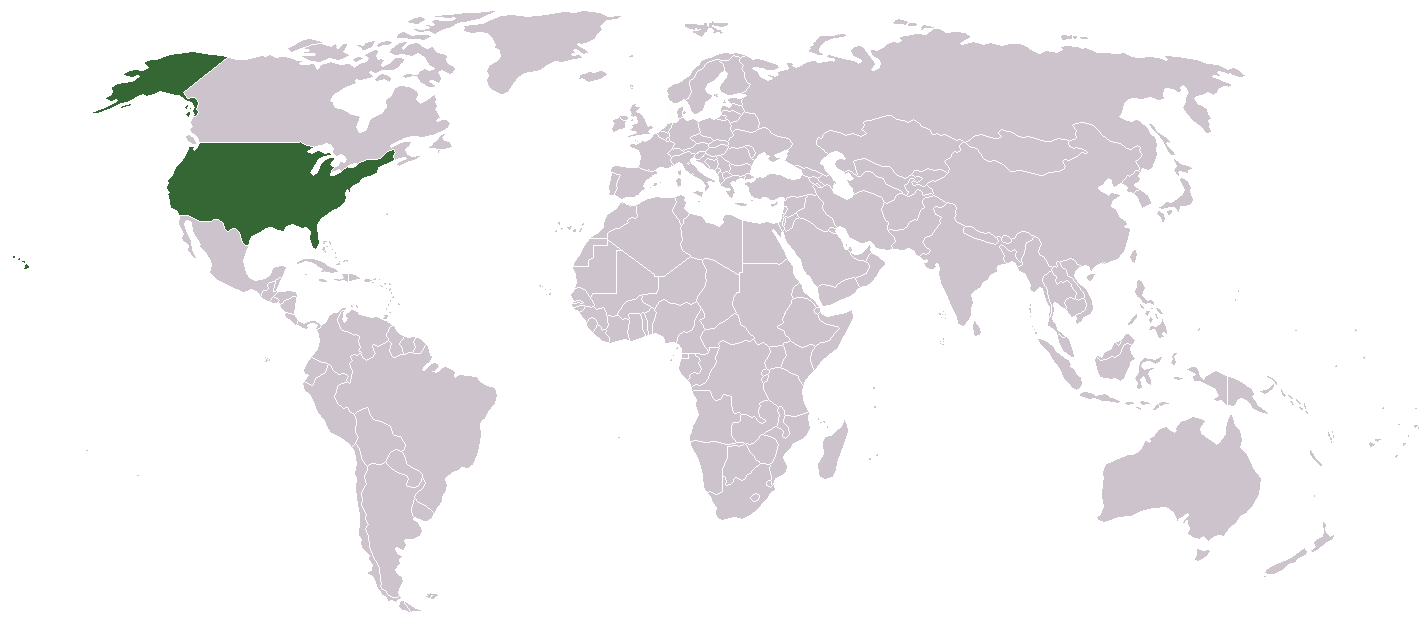
The United States is part of North America.

The environment of the United States comprises diverse biotas, climates, and geologies. This diversity leads to a number of different distinct regions and geographies in which human communities live. This includes a rich variety of species of animals, fungi, plants and other organisms.

Because of the strong forces of economic exploitation and industrialization, humans have had deep effects on the ecosystems of the United States, resulting in a number of environmental issues.

Since awareness of these issues emerged in the 1970s, environmental regulations and a growing environmental movement, including both climate movement and the environmental justice movement have emerged to respond to the various threats to the environment. These movements are intertwined with a long history of conservation, starting in the early 19th century, that has resulted in a robust network of protected areas, including 28.8% of land managed by the Federal government.

== Biota ==
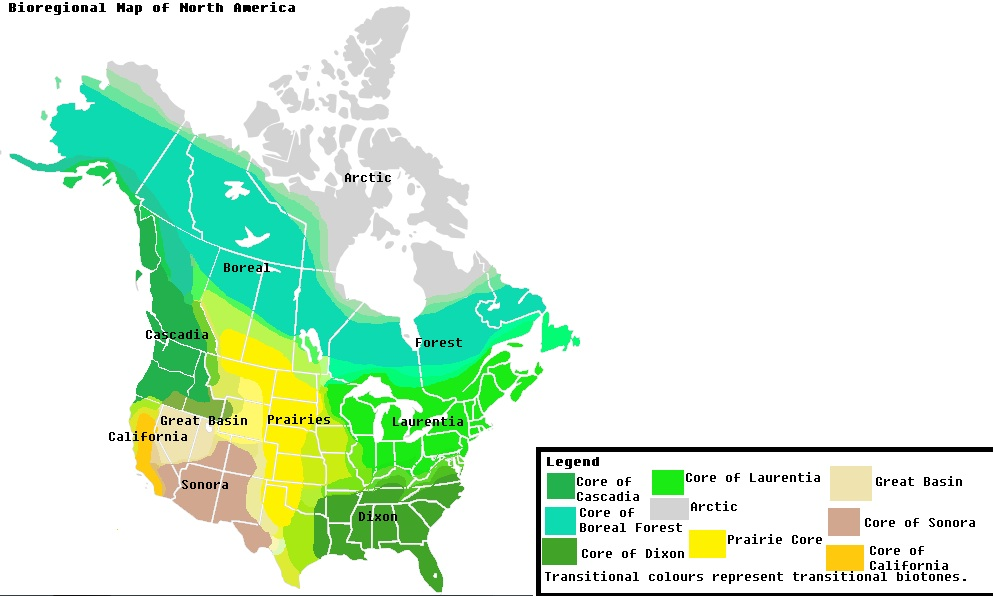
Bioregions of Northern America, according to one scheme.

=== Animals ===
There are about 21,717 different species of native plants and animals in the United States. More than 400 mammal, 700 bird, 500 reptile and amphibian, and 90,000 insect species have been documented. Wetlands, such as the Florida Everglades, are the base for much of this diversity. There are over 140,000 invertebrates in the United States which is constantly growing as researchers identify more species. Fish are the largest group of animal species, with over one thousand counted so far. About 13,000 species are added to the list of known organisms each year.

=== Fungi ===
Around 14,000 species of fungi were listed by Farr, Bills, Chamuris and Rossman in 1989. Still, this list only included terrestrial species. It did not include lichen-forming fungi, fungi on dung, freshwater fungi, marine fungi or many other categories. Fungi are essential to the survival of many groups of organisms.

=== Plants ===
With habitats ranging from tropical to Arctic, U.S. plant life is very diverse. The country has more than 17,000 identified native species of flora, including 5,000 in California (home to the tallest, the most massive, and the oldest trees in the world). Three quarters of the United States species consist of flowering plants.

=== Human impacts on biota ===
The country's ecosystems include thousands of non-native exotic species that often harm indigenous communities of living things. Many indigenous species became extinct soon after the first human settlement, including the North American megafauna; others have become nearly extinct since European settlement, among them the American bison and California condor. Many plants and animals have declined dramatically as a result of massive conversion and other human activity.

== Climate ==
Köppen climate types of the US

The U.S. climate is temperate in most areas, tropical in Hawaii and southern Florida, polar in Alaska, semiarid in the Great Plains west of the 100th meridian, Mediterranean in coastal California and arid in the Great Basin. Its comparatively generous climate contributed (in part) to the country's rise as a world power, with infrequent severe drought in the major agricultural regions, a general lack of widespread flooding, and a mainly temperate climate that receives adequate precipitation.

Following World War II, cities in the southern and western region experienced an economic and population boom. The population growth in the Southwest, has strained water and power resources, with water diverted from agricultural uses to major population centers, such as Las Vegas and Los Angeles. According to the California Department of Water Resources, if more supplies are not found by 2020, residents will face a water shortfall nearly as great as the amount consumed today.

The United States mainland contains a total of seven distinct regional climates. Those include high elevation Northwestern region, the Pacific Northwest, the High plains, Midwest/Ohio valley/New England, Mid Atlantic/Southeast, Southern region, and Southwestern region. Each region contains different states and has their own climate and temperatures throughout the year.

== Geology ==
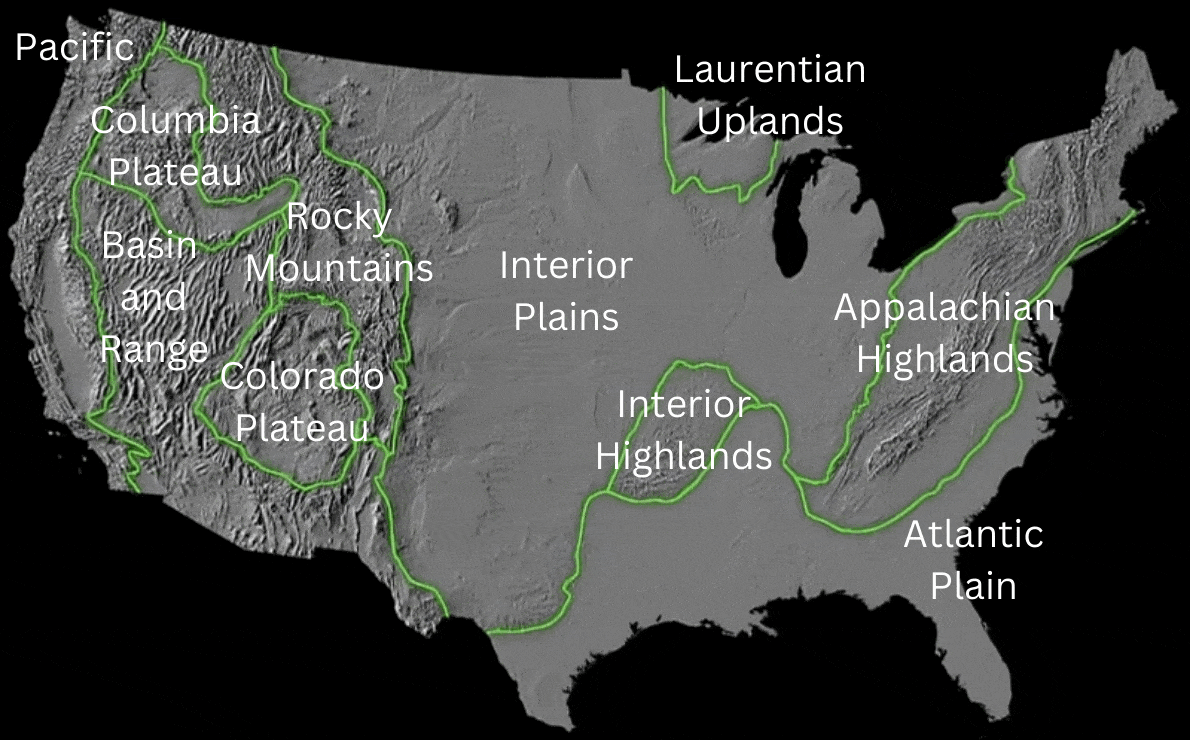
Shaded relief map of the United States, showing 10 geological provinces

The richly textured landscape of the United States is a product of the dueling forces of plate tectonics, weathering and erosion. Over the 4.5 billion-year history of the Earth, tectonic upheavals and colliding plates have raised great mountain ranges while the forces of erosion and weathering worked to tear them down. Even after many millions of years, records of Earth's great upheavals remain imprinted as textural variations and surface patterns that define distinctive landscapes or provinces.

Trends in carbon dioxide emission in US, 1800 to 2020

== History ==
The Environmental history of the United States covers the history of the environment over the centuries to the late 20th century, plus the political and expert debates on conservation and environmental issues.

The term "conservation" appeared in 1908 and was gradually replaced by "environmentalism" in the 1970s as the focus shifted from managing and protecting natural resources to a broader concern for the environment as a whole and the negative impact of poor air or water on humans.

For recent history see Environmental policy of the United States.

== Environmental law and conservation ==
The nation's major environmental laws were enacted between 1969 and 1980:

- National Environmental Policy Act (1969)
- Clean Air Act (1970)
- Federal Insecticide, Fungicide, and Rodenticide Act (1972)
- Clean Water Act (1972)
- Endangered Species Act (1973)
- Safe Drinking Water Act (1974)
- Resource Conservation and Recovery Act (1976)
- Toxic Substances Control Act (1976)
- "Superfund" Act (1980)

The Endangered Species Act protects threatened and endangered species and their habitats, which are monitored by the U.S. Fish and Wildlife Service.

=== Protected areas ===
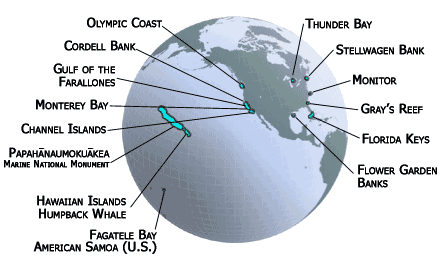
United States National Marine Sanctuaries

The United States maintains national parks as well as other preservation areas, such as the Florida Everglades. There are more than 400 protected sites spread across 84 million acres but very few are large enough to contain ecosystems.

In 1872, the world's first national park was established at Yellowstone. Another fifty-seven national parks and hundreds of other federally managed parks and forests have since been formed. Wilderness areas have been established around the country to ensure long-term protection of pristine habitats. Altogether, the U.S. government regulates 1,020,779 square miles (2,643,807 km^{2}), 28.8% of the country's total land area. Protected parks and forestland constitute most of this. As of March 2004, approximately 16% of public land under Bureau of Land Management administration was being leased for commercial oil and natural gas drilling; public land is also leased for mining and cattle ranching.

== Environmental issues ==
Of the major greenhouse gas emitting nations, the U.S. is among the highest per person emitters.

Annual CO_{2} emissions, total by country (2017 data) shows the U.S. trails China in total annual emissions (not per capita).

Environmental issues in the United States include climate change, energy, species conservation, invasive species, deforestation, mining, nuclear accidents, pesticides, pollution, waste and over-population. Despite taking hundreds of measures, the rate of environmental issues is increasing rapidly instead of reducing. The United States is among the most significant emitters of greenhouse gasses in the world. In terms of both total and per capita emissions, it is among the largest contributors. The climate policy of the United States has a major influence on the world.

=== Climate change ===
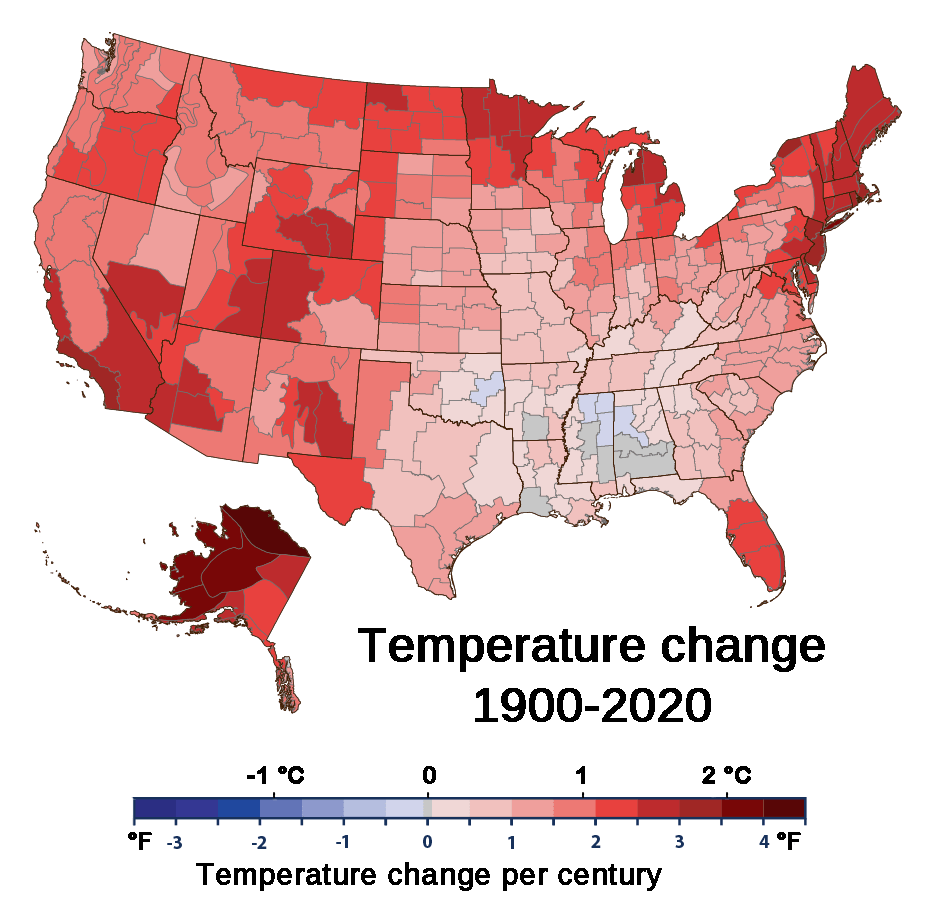
Average temperatures in almost all regions in the U.S. have increased in the last 120 years.

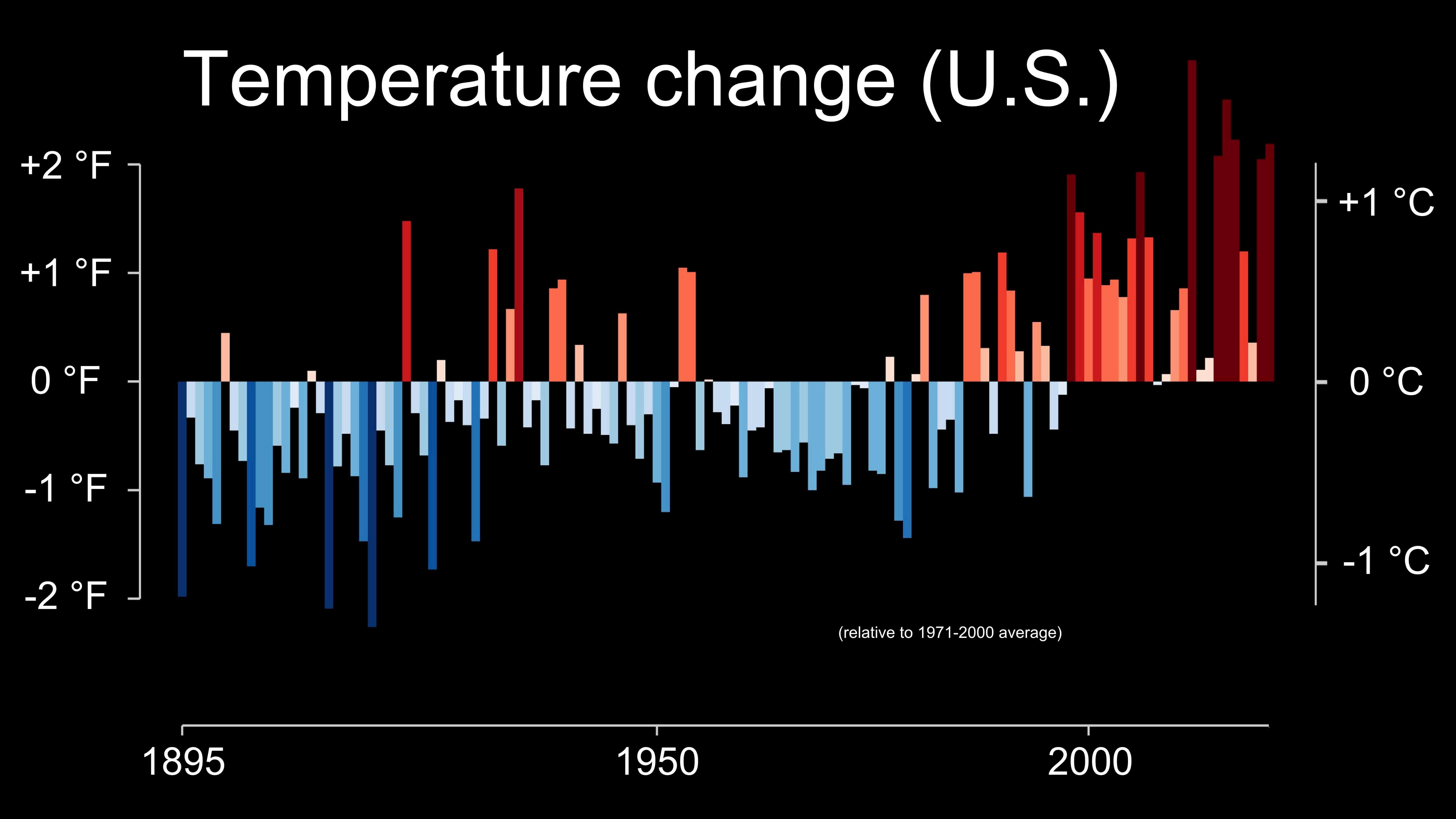
Annual temperatures averaged across the U.S. have exceeded the 1971–2000 average almost every year in the 21st century.

Climate change has led to the United States warming up by 2.6 °F (1.4 °C) since 1970. In 2023, the global average near-surface temperature reached 1.45 °C above pre-industrial levels, making it the warmest year on record. The climate of the United States is shifting in ways that are widespread and varied between regions. From 2010 to 2019, the United States experienced its hottest decade on record. Extreme weather events, invasive species, floods and droughts are increasing. Climate change's impacts on tropical cyclones and sea level rise also affect regions of the country.

Cumulatively since 1850, the U.S. has emitted a larger share than any country of the greenhouse gases causing current climate change, with some 20% of the global total of carbon dioxide alone. Current US emissions per person are among the largest in the world. Various state and federal climate change policies have been introduced, and the US has ratified the Paris Agreement despite temporarily withdrawing. In 2021, the country set a target of halving its annual greenhouse gas emissions by 2030, however oil and gas companies still get tax breaks.

Climate change is having considerable impacts on the environment and society of the United States. This includes implications for agriculture, the economy (especially the affordability and availability of insurance), human health, and indigenous peoples, and it is seen as a national security threat. US States that emit more carbon dioxide per person and introduce policies to oppose climate action are generally experiencing greater impacts. 2020 was a historic year for billion-dollar weather and climate disasters in U.S. In 2024, the United States experienced 27 separate weather and climate disasters, each causing over $1 billion in damages, in total, it caused $27 billion in damages. This set a record for the most billion dollars disasters in a single year.

Although historically a non-partisan issue, climate change has become controversial and politically divisive in the country in recent decades. Oil companies have known since the 1970s that burning oil and gas could cause global warming but nevertheless funded deniers for years. Despite the support of a clear scientific consensus, as recently as 2021 one-third of Americans deny that human-caused climate change exists although the majority are concerned or alarmed about the issue.

== Conservation ==
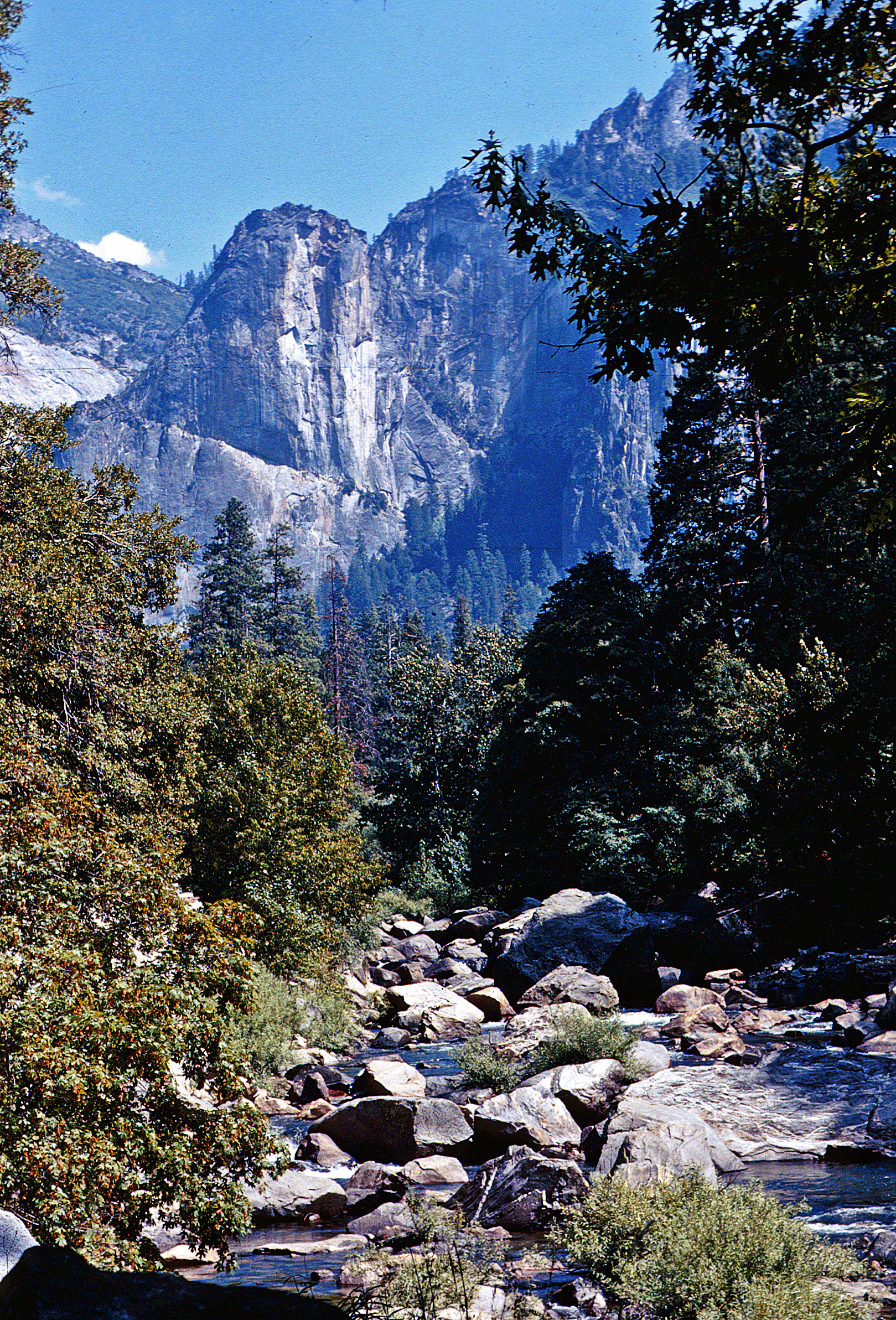
Yosemite National Park

Conservation in the United States can be traced back to the 19th century with the formation of the first National Park. Conservation generally refers to the act of consciously and efficiently using land and/or its natural resources. This can be in the form of setting aside tracts of land for protection from hunting or urban development, or it can take the form of using less resources such as metal, water, or coal. Usually, this process of conservation occurs through or after legislation on local or national levels is passed.

Conservation in the United States, as a movement, began with the American sportsmen who came to the realization that wanton waste of wildlife and their habitat had led to the extinction of some species, while other species were at risk. John Muir and the Sierra Club started the modern movement, history shows that the Boone and Crockett Club, formed by Theodore Roosevelt, spearheaded conservation in the United States.

While conservation and preservation both have similar definitions and broad categories, preservation in the natural and environmental scope refers to the action of keeping areas the way they are and trying to dissuade the use of its resources; conservation may employ similar methods but does not call for the diminishing of resource use but rather calls for a responsible way of going about it. A distinction between Sierra Club and Boone and Crockett Club is that Sierra Club was and is considered a preservationist organization whereas Boone and Crockett Club endorses conservation, simply defined as an "intelligent use of natural resources."

== See also ==
- Environmental history of the United States
- Environmental movement in the United States
- National Environmental Information Exchange Network
- Timeline of major U.S. environmental and occupational health regulation
