= Green Builder Media =

Green Builder Media LLC is a North American media company focused on green building and sustainability.

== Green Builder Magazine ==
Green Builder Media produces the monthly business-to-business magazine Green Builder. The magazine covers sustainable homes, high performance construction techniques, innovations in energy efficiency, water conservation, eco-landscaping, resilient housing, building science, indoor air quality and many other topics related to sustainability and construction.

The current Editor-in-Chief is Matt Power.

== Projects ==
Along with the magazine, Green Builder Media constructs high-performance demonstration homes around the country. To date, they have completed homes and interactive exhibits in Tucson, AZ; Los Angeles, CA; Orlando, FL; Aspen, CO; Las Vegas, NV and Lake City, CO.

From 2012 to 2015, Green Builder Media partnered with the National Fire Protection Association, Siemens, GM, Ingersoll-Rand, Armstrong, Boral, Hanwha Solar, Kohler, Panasonic, Pella and Schott AG in collaboration with Walt Disney Imagineering, to create the VISION HOUSE at Innoventions (Epcot). The exhibit was the latest in a series of futuristic representations of the American home. Its predecessors include the famous Monsanto House of the Future, a popular exhibit at Disney's Tomorrowland.

In 2015, GreenBuilder ran a 9-part series called "The Celestia Project", which looked at what life might be like in the year 2100, through a lens of sustainability and green living.
