= Water Education Foundation =

- Location(s): California and the Southwestern United States., United States

The Water Education Foundation is a nonprofit organization whose goal is to provide information on water issues in California and the Southwestern United States.

The Foundation's mission, since its founding in 1977, has been "to create a better understanding of water resources and foster public understanding and resolution of water resource issues through facilitation, education and outreach".

Located in Sacramento, California, the Foundation offers publications, public television documentaries, briefings and conferences and school programs to help educate the public on a variety of water issues. The Foundation is led by an executive director and governed by a volunteer board of 33 members representing water, education, business, environmental and public interest communities in California. The board of directors meets quarterly.

== Public television documentaries ==
In 2009 the Foundation won a regional Emmy award for the 2008 public television documentary, Salt of the Earth: Salinity in California’s Central Valley hosted by comedian Paul Rodriguez. This program discusses the growing problem of salt buildup in the Central Valley and discusses potential solutions. Two other documentaries, Fate of the Jewel (2001), which discusses Lake Tahoe pollution, and High Stakes at the Salton Sea (2002), which discusses efforts to restore the Salton Sea and is narrated by actor Val Kilmer, also received regional Emmy awards.

== Publications, briefings and conferences ==
The flagship of the Foundation is Western Water, which became an online news publication in 2018.

In 2000, the Foundation released a book, Water and the Shaping of California, written by then-Program Director Sue McClurg.

Each year the Foundation organizes conferences and briefings that focus on current water issues and include prominent speakers from the water community. Events in 2009 included a U.S.–Mexico Binational Drought Science conference with the California Department of Water Resources. Events in 2010 have included an International Groundwater Conference, organized with the University of California, Davis, with speakers from organizations including U.S. Geological Survey, International Water Management Institute and the California Farm Bureau. In August 2010 the Foundation was one of several nonpartisan groups (including the California Center for the Book and the California State Library) that participated in 'Water Conversations' held in the Sacramento Delta area by the University of California Cooperative Extension Service.
