= Chicago Climate Action Plan =

Chicago's climate change mitigation and adaptation strategy

The Chicago Climate Action Plan (CCAP) is Chicago's climate change mitigation and adaptation strategy that was adopted in September 2008. The CCAP has an overarching goal of reducing Chicago's greenhouse gas emissions to 80 percent below 1990 levels by 2050, with an interim goal of 25 percent below 1990 levels by 2020.

== Background ==
A greenhouse gas emissions forecast projected that Chicago’s emissions would increase to 39.3 million metric tons of carbon dioxide equivalent by 2020 under a business-as-usual scenario. One projected global warming impact is an increase in days that have temperatures over one hundred degrees. Under the business-as-usual scenario, the number of these days would increase to thirty-one annually, while under a lower emissions scenario, such as that called for in the Chicago Climate Action Plan, the number of these days would increase to eight annually. Climate change has many impacts, including an economic impact. The Chicago Climate Action Plan seeks to address climate change by decreasing greenhouse gas emissions to mitigate its effects, while preparing for climate change through adaptation actions.

== Design ==
The Chicago Climate Action Plan consists of five strategies: Energy Efficient Buildings; Clean & Renewable Energy Sources; Improved Transportation Options; Reduced Waste & Industrial Pollution; and Adaptation. The first four strategies are designed to mitigate climate change, while the fifth strategy aims to adapt to climate change.

=== Energy efficient buildings ===
According to a 2000 greenhouse gas emission inventory, building and other energy uses are responsible for 70 percent of Chicago's emissions. The Energy Efficient Buildings strategy accounts for 30 percent of Chicago's total greenhouse gas reductions. Building energy efficiency improvements are projected to have a diverse set of benefits, including savings on energy bills for building owners, job creation in the building retrofit field, and decreased greenhouse gas emissions.

Action	Description
Retrofit commercial and industrial buildings	Retrofit 50 percent of commercial and industrial building stock, resulting in a 30 percent energy reduction.
Retrofit residential buildings	Improve efficiency of 50 percent of residential buildings to achieve a 30 percent reduction in energy used.
Trade in appliances	Expand appliance trade-in and lightbulb replacement program.
Conserve water	Improve water use in buildings as part of retrofits.
Upgrade City energy code	Align Chicago's Energy Conservation Code with latest international standards.
Establish new guidelines for renovation	Require all building renovations to meet green standards.
Cool with trees and green roofs	Increase rooftop gardens to total of 6,000 buildings citywide and plant an estimated one million trees.
Take easy steps	Encourage all Chicagoans to take easy steps to reduce their emissions by one metric ton of CO _{2}e per person.

=== Clean & renewable energy sources ===
The Clean & Renewable Energy strategy accounts for 34 percent of Chicago's total greenhouse gas reductions. This strategy includes a focus on distributed generation as an efficient and lower-emission alternative to central power plants. Household renewable power is another action that reduces greenhouse gas emissions.

Action	Description
Upgrade power plants	Upgrade or repower 21 Illinois power plants.
Improve power plant efficiency	Raise efficiency standards for new and existing power generators.
Build renewable electricity	Procure enough renewable energy generation for Chicagoans to reduce electricity emissions by 20 percent.
Increase distributed generation	Increase efficient power generated on-site using distributed generation and combined heat and power.
Promote household renewable power	Double current household-scale renewable electricity generation.

=== Improved transportation options ===
According to a 2000 greenhouse gas emissions inventory, transportation is responsible for 30 percent of Chicago's emissions. The Improved Transportation Options strategy accounts for 23 percent of Chicago's total greenhouse gas reductions. This strategy focuses on the availability and use of alternative modes of transportation to driving as well as reducing the emissions associated with driving.

Action	Description
Invest more in transit	Invest in transit improvements and boost Chicago transit system ridership by 30 percent.
Expand transit incentives	Provide incentives for transit use, such as pre-tax transit passes.
Promote transit-oriented development	Encourage development focused on public transit, walking and bicycle use.
Make walking and biking easier	Increase the number of walking and bicycle trips to one million a year.
Car share and carpool	Boost car sharing, carpooling and vanpooling.
Improve fleet efficiency	Improve the energy efficiency of fleets in Chicago, including buses, taxis and delivery vehicles.
Achieve higher fuel efficiency standards	Advocate for implementation of higher federal fuel efficiency standards.
Switch to cleaner fuels	Increase the supply and use of sustainable alternative fuels for Chicago vehicles.
Support intercity rail	Support intercity high-speed passenger rail plan.
Improve freight movement	Foster more efficient freight movement, including support for CREATE.

=== Reduced waste & industrial pollution ===
According to a 2000 greenhouse gas emissions inventory, waste and industrial processes are responsible for nine percent of Chicago's emissions. The Reduced Waste & Industrial Pollution strategy accounts for 13 percent of Chicago's total greenhouse gas reductions. In addition to focusing on waste, this strategy has actions to reduce the emissions from refrigerants and use green infrastructure to capture stormwater.

Action	Description
Reduce, reuse and recycle	Reduce, reuse and recycle 90 percent of the city’s waste by 2020.
Shift to alternative refrigerants	Promote the use of alternative refrigerants in air conditioners and appliances.
Capture stormwater on-site	Manage stormwater with green infrastructure.

=== Adaptation ===
The Adaptation strategy does not include a greenhouse gas emission reduction target. Instead, this strategy focuses on preparing for the effects of climate change. This strategy has actions to prepare for extreme heat and urban heat island, extreme precipitation and heavy flooding, and ecosystem changes. In addition, there are actions to engage the public and businesses.

Action	Description
Manage heat	Update the heat response plan, focusing on vulnerable populations; complete further research into urban heat island effect and pursue ways to cool hot spots.
Pursue innovative cooling	Launch an effort to seek out innovative ideas for cooling the city and encourage property owners to make green landscape and energy efficiency improvements.
Protect air quality	Intensify efforts to reduce ozone precursors through mitigation programs that reduce driving and emissions from power plants.
Manage stormwater	Collaborate with the Metropolitan Water Reclamation District on a Chicago watershed plan that factors in climate change and uses vacant land to manage stormwater.
Implement Green Urban Design	Implement key steps in Chicago's Green Urban Design plan to manage heat and flooding. These steps will enable Chicago to capture rain where it falls and reflect away some of the intensity of the sun on hot days.
Preserve our plants and trees	Publish a new plant-growing list that focuses on plants that can thrive in altered climate. Also draft a new landscape ordinance to accommodate plants that can tolerate the altered climate.
Engage the public	Share climate research findings with groups most affected - social service agencies, garden clubs, etc. Help individual households to take their own steps to reduce flooding and manage heat waves, such as installing rain barrels and back-up power for sump pumps and planting shade trees.
Engage businesses	Work with businesses to analyze their vulnerability to climate change and take action.
Plan for the future	Use the Green Steering Committee of City Commissioners to oversee City implementation efforts and the Green Ribbon Committee of businesses and community leaders to assess how the Plan is being implemented, recommend revisions, report to the Mayor and all Chicagoans on our progress.

== Progress ==
In 2010, a Chicago Climate Action Plan Progress Report was released and covers highlights from January 2008 through December 2009 .

== See also ==
- Politics of global warming (United States)
