= GEOLibrary =

The Global Environmental and Occupational Health e-Library or GeoLibrary is a database of occupational safety and health and environmental health training materials and practice tools. The library is divided into three sections: Environmental Health; Occupational Health and Safety; and a specialty library on Road Safety at Work.

The GeoLibrary is a project of the Network of Collaborating Centres Work Plan in support of the World Health Organization (“WHO”) strategy “Occupational Health for All,” and is maintained by the Great Lakes Centers for Occupational and Environmental Safety and Health at the University of Illinois at Chicago School of Public Health. It was created with the following specific aims, to provide:

1. Training materials on diseases of occupation and the environment
2. Training materials on hazards and diseases as they pertain to individual economic sectors
3. Teaching materials specific to prevention, safety, advocacy, legal and ethical issues, roles of government, etc.
4. Practice materials for control and prevention

With a focus on training programs and capacity building, the GeoLibrary provides its users with access to complete courses, tutorials/modules, fact sheets, sample/model programs, guidelines and case studies, all within the public domain and free of charge. Resources are available in six languages (English, Spanish, French, Russian, Chinese and Arabic) and come from a variety of sources (international organizations, governmental institutes and agencies, academic institutions, corporations, and unions).

The construction of the library was made possible through a gift from Abbott Fund. Additional support for its creation was provided by the U.S. National Center for Environmental Health, the U.S. National Institutes of Health Fogarty International Center, and National Institute for Occupational Safety and Health ("NIOSH") Training Program.

In kind support was provided by NIOSH, the U.S. National Institute for Environmental Health Sciences, the U.S. Environmental Protection Agency, the U.S. Agency for Toxic Substances and Disease Registry, and WHO Collaborating Centres in Occupational Health.

== Environmental Health Materials ==
The environmental health branch of the GeoLibrary provides training materials, practice tools and capacity-building resources on topics such as environmental disasters, exposure to physical, chemical, biological and waste hazards, environmental health practice, and environmental management.

In January 2010, in response to the Haiti earthquake, the GeoLibrary and the Pan American Health Organization (“PAHO”) coordinated a request for natural disaster-related training materials from the Network of Collaborating Centres. The result of this collaboration was the timely creation of a library section entitled “Special Focus: Haiti,” which included emergency and disaster response materials in French, English and Spanish.

== Occupational Safety and Health Materials ==
The occupational safety and health branch of the GeoLibrary provides training materials, practice tools and capacity-building resources in areas such as exposure to physical, psychosocial, chemical, and biological hazards, adverse health effects, and control strategies. It also includes a sub-section focused on the safety and health hazards of different economic sectors.

In 2009, the GeoLibrary collaborated with PAHO to centralize resources related to the Influenza A (H1N1) virus. The result was the creation of a database entry entitled “Hot Topic: H1N1.” Resources included in this section apply to businesses, agricultural workers, educational facilities, health care facilities, laboratory workers, and travel industry workers.

== Specialty: Road Safety at Work ==
In collaboration with NIOSH, the Specialty: Road Safety at Work branch was added to provide materials related to the prevention of road traffic injuries and deaths while at work. The resources include employer policies and guidance documents on road safety at work, research reports on risk factors for work-related crashes, as well as statistics about worker injuries and fatalities on roads.

== See also ==
Occupational safety and health
