= San Francisco Climate Action Plan =

Environmental initiative

The San Francisco Climate Action Plan is a greenhouse gas reduction initiative adopted by the City and County of San Francisco, United States in 2002. It aims to reduce the city's greenhouse gas emissions to 20% below 1990 levels by 2012. The plan was updated in 2013 to adopt an updated target of 40% below 1990 levels by 2025.

== Greenhouse gas emissions ==
San Francisco's annual greenhouse gas emissions were 9.7 million tons equivalent carbon dioxide (eCO_{2}) in 2000., which was 12.5 tons eCO_{2} per person. This level of emissions is lower than both the state and country in which San Francisco is located: California's annual per capita emissions of 14.2 tons eCO_{2} in 2000, and USA's annual per capita emissions of 20.4 CO_{2} in 2000. However, it is much higher than the emissions level for the world as a whole, which was 4.4 tons CO_{2} per person in 2003.

== History ==
The Climate Action Plan is one of many initiatives adopted by state and local governments in the USA to reduce greenhouse gas emissions, enacted primarily in response due to the absence of such action at the federal level. It was approved by the San Francisco Board of Supervisors as Resolution Number 0158-02, the Greenhouse Gas Emission Reduction Resolution, on 2002-03-04. In doing so, San Francisco also joined over 500 cities to participate in the Cities for Climate Protection Campaign of the International Council for Local Environmental Initiatives.

== Goals ==
San Francisco's annual greenhouse gas emissions were 9.1 million tons equivalent carbon dioxide (eCO_{2}) in 1990 and 9.7 million tons eCO_{2} in 2000, and the Climate Action Plan's goal is to reduce emissions to 7.2 million tons eCO_{2} by 2012. These goals, therefore, represent reductions of greenhouse gas emissions of 20% from 1990 levels and 26% from 2000 levels. The sources of greenhouse gases include those generated due to fossil fuel and electricity consumption used for transportation, natural gas, and electricity used in buildings, and well as those generated by solid waste.

== Reports ==
The plan's first report, Climate Action Plan for San Francisco, Local Actions to Reduce Greenhouse Gas Emissions was published by the San Francisco Department of the Environment and the San Francisco Public Utilities Commission with assistance from the International Council for Local Environmental Initiatives in September 2004. In four chapters, the report describes the causes and local impacts of climate change, the city's greenhouse gas emissions reduction target, actions to reduce those emissions, and an implementation strategy for the near term.

The 2004 report proposes a wide variety of actions to achieve its stated emissions reductions, which fall into the following categories: transportation, energy efficiency, renewable energy, and solid waste. Within each category, each action is described including an estimate for the CO_{2} emissions reduction it would result in. The table below summarizes these.

Category	Action	CO_{2} Reduction (tons)
Transportation	Increase the Use of Public Transit as an Alternative to Driving	87,000
Transportation	Increase the Use of Ridesharing as an Alternative to Single-Occupancy Driving	42,000
Transportation	Increase Bicycling and Walking as an Alternative to Driving	10,000
Transportation	Support Trip Reduction through Employer-Based Programs	28,000
Transportation	Discourage Driving	155,000
Transportation	Increase the Use of Clean Air Vehicles and Improve Fleet Efficiency	641,000
		963,000
Energy Efficiency	Increase Incentive, Direct Installation and Technical Assistance	700,000
Energy Efficiency	Expand Education and Outreach	36,000
Energy Efficiency	Strengthen Legislation, Codes, and Standards	65,000
		801,000
Renewable Energy	Develop Renewable Energy Projects	318,000
Renewable Energy	Conduct Pilot Project for Emerging Technologies	-
Renewable Energy	Support and Develop Green Power Purchasing	230,000
		548,000
Solid Waste	Increase Residential Recycling and Composting	70,000
Solid Waste	Increase Commercial Recycling and Composting	109,000
Solid Waste	Expand Construction and Demolition Debris Recycling	57,000
Solid Waste	Support Alternate Collection Methods for Recyclable Materials	66,000
Solid Waste	Promote Source Reduction, Reuse, and Other Waster Reduction	-
		302,000
Total		2,614,000

== Results ==
San Francisco met its Climate Action Plan targets with a 28.5% reduction from 1990 levels. The 2015 total was 4.4 million mtCO2e.

== See also ==
- Individual and political action on climate change
- Climate change mitigation
- List of countries by carbon dioxide emissions per capita
- San Francisco Mandatory Recycling and Composting Ordinance
- San Diego Climate Action Plan
