= CoolCalifornia.org =

Californian website focused on environmental resources

CoolCalifornia.org is a website for Californians with resources to help them reduce their impact on the environment and combat climate change. The website is geared towards different audiences, including: individuals, small businesses, local government, youth, community organizations, and schools. The website currently features two carbon footprint calculators. One is for individuals and households and one is for small businesses; a similar tool for local governments is under development.

== History ==
CoolCalifornia.org was created by a team of California State agencies, universities and a nonprofit organization. Partners include the California Air Resources Board, the University of California, Berkeley, Lawrence Berkeley National Lab, the California Energy Commission, Next 10, and the California Public Utilities Commission.

== Tools ==
CoolCalifornia.org offers a variety of resources for all types of Californians looking to reduce their impact on the environment. Such resources include: carbon calculators, ideas and tips to save money, case studies of small businesses and local governments that have "gone green," lists of rebate programs, and resource lists linking to other websites. The site offers guidelines called "toolkits" for small businesses, local governments, and schools. These toolkits help people learn how to create climate action plans.

The carbon calculators are California-specific and calculate both direct greenhouse gas emissions, such as from fuel burned in your car or a natural gas furnace, and indirect greenhouse gas emissions, such as those emitted at power plants, or embedded in food or purchased goods. For both the household and small business calculators, all calculations are transparent and references are provided. CoolCalifornia.org's household carbon calculator has been ranked among the most robust available, even though various carbon footprint calculators can produce different carbon footprint results.

== Awards ==
CoolCalifornia.org offered its first Small Business Awards in 2009. One of the awards given out was for Organization of the Year. Another award was given out for Small Business of the Year. Excellence awards were also given out to organizations and businesses.

== See also ==
- Climate change in California
- Environment of California
