= Our World 2.0 =

Online magazine

Our World
- Website type: News
- Available in: English, Japanese
- Owner: United Nations University
- Creator: United Nations University
- Website: ourworld.unu.edu/en/
- Launched: July 2008

Our World 2.0 is an online magazine created by the United Nations University Media Centre, located in Tokyo, Japan. At launch, it initially focused on climate change, peak oil, biodiversity, and food security. The magazine was affiliated with The Guardian's Environment Network for a number of years.

== History and mission ==
Our World 2.0 was launched in July 2008, in time for the 34th G8 summit.

In August 2009, Our World 2.0 became part of The Guardian's Environment Network.

The central tenet of Our World 2.0 is that humanity can use its collective knowledge, technology, and design to facilitate creativity, innovation, and collaboration among people in order to respond to these challenges.

In 2013, the Our World 2.0 online magazine was completely redesigned and the range of topics covered was expanded to encompass all areas of the United Nations' work. At that time, the 2.0 tag was dropped from the magazine.

The story behind the development of the Our World 2.0 magazine was covered in a book chapter published in 2013 by Brendan F.D. Barrett, Mark Notoras and Carol Smith. All were involved as editors for the magazine.

One innovative component of the Our World 2.0 magazine was the introduction of video briefs – short 5–6 minute videos designed to introduce complex scientific issues (mainly in the field) to policy-makers and the general public. They tend to be short, character-driven stories about people and organisations that are tackling complex social development and environmental issues in new, innovative ways. They can be viewed on the United Nations University's YouTube Channel.

== Licensing and platform ==
Our World 2.0 uses of Creative Commons licensing to enable other interested parties to copy and modify the materials contained in the web-zine. It uses open source software called WordPress.
