= Global Fishing Watch =

Global Fishing Watch Inc
- Formation: Tax-exempt since July 2017; 8 years ago
- Founder: Oceana, SkyTruth and Google
- Type: 501(c)(3)
- Headquarters: Washington, D.C.
- Revenue: 69,478,777 USD (2023)
- Expenses: 13,167,862 USD (2023)
- Website: globalfishingwatch.org

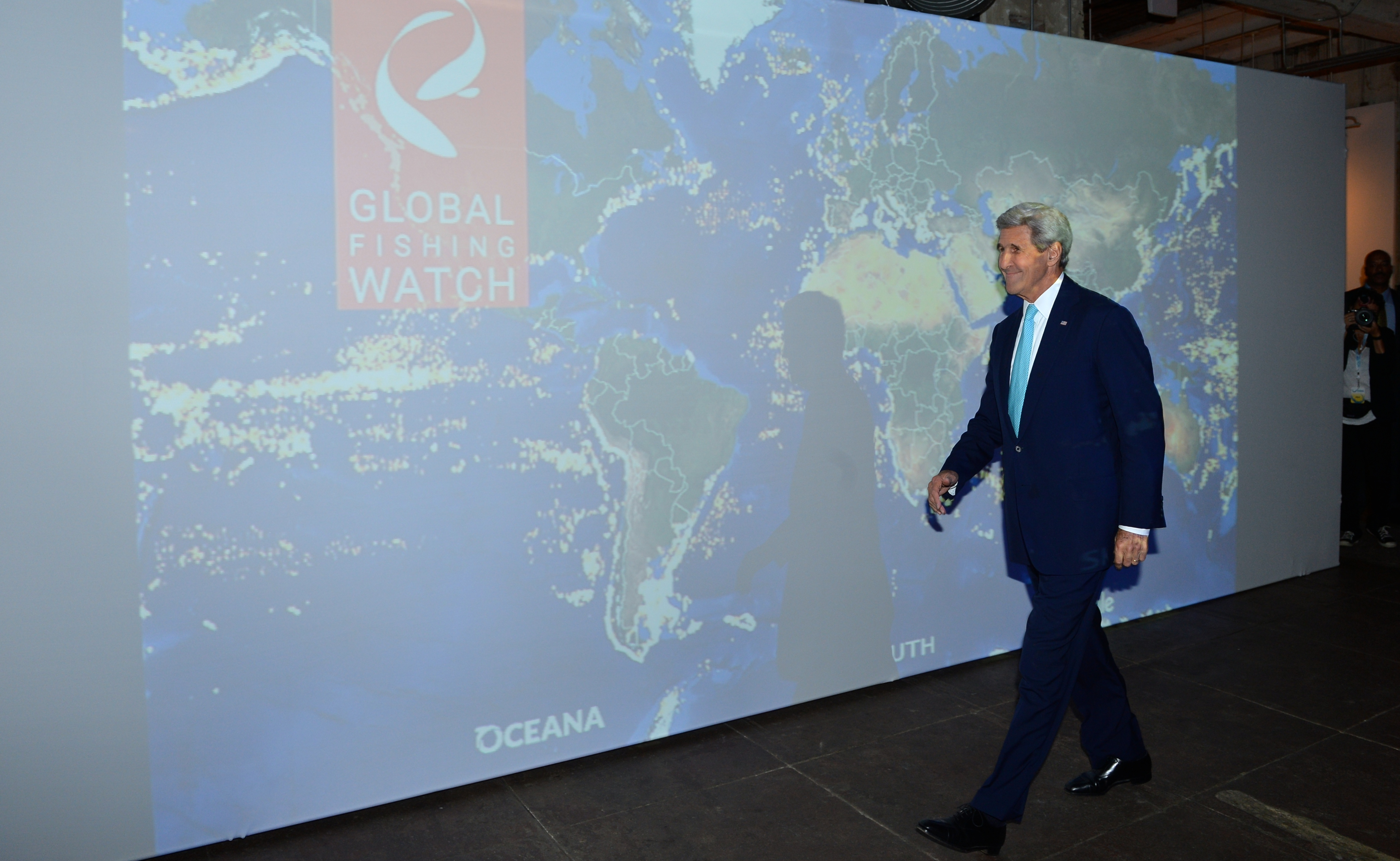
Secretary Kerry Heads to the stage to deliver remarks at the Global Fishing Watch Preview Reception at the Long View Gallery in Washington. (29661895376)

Global Fishing Watch is an independent, international nonprofit organization. It started by a website launched in September 2016 by Google in partnership with Oceana and SkyTruth "to provide the world’s first global view of commercial fishing activities." At any moment, 200,000 vessels are publicizing their locations via the Automatic Identification System (AIS).

Global Fishing Watch enables users with Internet access to monitor fishing activity globally, and to view "individual vessel tracks, exclusive economic zones, marine protected areas, and other features." It is hoped that the initiative can help to reduce "global overfishing, illegal fishing and habitat destruction."

The technology was made publicly available at the 2016 US State Department's Our Oceans Conference in Washington, DC. The project was partly financed by the Leonardo DiCaprio Foundation and the Bertarelli Foundation. In June 2017, almost a year after being officially launched at the Our Ocean Conference, Global Fishing Watch was established as an independent, international nonprofit organization.

In March 2019, Global Fishing Watch helped convince the Panamian authorities to release Vessel Monitoring System data on Panamian ships. This has helped them track Panamian-flagged ships, leading to the apprehension of the MV NIKA for illegal fishing by the Indonesian coastguard in July 2019. Other countries such as Chile have then followed suit.

== See also ==
- Overfishing
- Fish migration
- Fish farming
- MarineTraffic, an open website providing information and tracking of shipping vessels at real-time
