= National Environmental Information Exchange Network =

The National Environmental Information Exchange Network (NEIEN) is a partnership of states, territories, tribes, and the United States Environmental Protection Agency (EPA). The NEIEN is a secure Internet and standards-based approach for exchanging environmental data and improving environmental decisions. This allows members of the NEIEN to share data efficiently and securely over the internet. This new approach allows real time access to higher quality data while saving time, resources, and money for partner states, tribes, and territories.
