= 2002 California Proposition 50 =

California law

Proposition 50 was a proposition in the state of California on the November 5, 2002 ballot. The proposition passed with 3,808,594 (55.4%) votes in favor and 3,076,333 (44.6%) against. It was placed on the ballot through the initiative process.

When put on the ballot, the question before voters was:

Should the state borrow three billion four hundred forty million dollars ($3,440,000,000) through the sale of general obligation bonds for a variety of water projects including coastal protection, the CALFED Bay-Delta Program, integrated regional water management, safe drinking water, and water quality?

== Official summary ==
The passing of California Proposition 50 would allow:

- 3,440,000,000 general obligation bonds to fund a variety of water projects, including:
  - Specified CALFED Bay-Delta Program projects including urban and agricultural water use efficiency projects
  - Grants and loans to reduce Colorado River water use
  - Purchasing, protecting and restoring coastal wetlands near urban areas
  - Competitive grants for water management and quality improvement projects
  - Development of river parkways
  - Improved security for state, local and regional water systems
  - Grants for desalination and drinking water disinfection
- Appropriates money from state General Fund to pay off bonds

== State and Local Government ==
The passing of California Proposition 50 resulted in a cost of up to $6.9 billion over 30 years to pay off both the principal ($3.44 billion) and interest ($3.46 billion) costs on the bonds at a state level. This will consist of payments of about $230 million per year. It would also cause a reduction in local property tax revenues, ranging from a few million dollars to roughly $10 million annually, about one-half of which would be off-set by state payments to schools to make up their revenue loss. It had unknown costs to state and local governments to operate or maintain the properties or projects purchased or developed with the bond funds.

Results by county: Yes: 60–70%; 50–60%; No: 80–90%; 70–80%; 60–70%; 50–60%

== See also ==
List of California ballot propositions 2000-present
