= SkyTruth =

Environmental organization

- Formation: 2001
- Founder: John Amos
- Type: Nonprofit
- Legal status: Active
- Purpose: Conservation, environmental monitoring, transparency
- Headquarters: Shepherdstown, West Virginia, U.S.
- Region served: Global
- Official language: English
- Founder: John Amos
- Affiliations: Global Fishing Watch (co-founder)
- Website: skytruth.org

SkyTruth is a nonprofit environmental watchdog that uses satellite imagery and remote sensing data to identify and monitor threats to the planet's natural resources. Its stated mission is to "share the view from space to promote conservation for people and the planet." Areas of focus range from issues such as offshore drilling, oil spills, hydraulic fracturing, mountaintop removal mining, illegal fishing and habitat change detection. SkyTruth releases all of its imagery and data to researchers and the public for free with the goal of greater transparency to hold industries and governments accountable for environmental harm.

== History ==
SkyTruth was founded in 2001 by John Amos, a geologist working in the private sector who became concerned with humankind's growing impact on the planet. Amos spoke with advocates in various environmental groups to discuss their communication needs and resource limitations and found a niche in providing analysis of satellite and aerial imagery to non-governmental organizations (NGOs), environmental advocates, academic researchers, and government resource managers. Early SkyTruth projects included mapping the landscape impact of natural gas drilling in the Rocky Mountains, revealing commercial fishing vessel activity on the outskirts of marine protected areas, and showing the growing environmental impact of strip mining for coal and other minerals throughout the United States.

=== Deepwater Horizon disaster ===
In April 2010, the offshore oil drilling rig Deepwater Horizon, operated by BP P.L.C., exploded in the Gulf of Mexico and triggered the largest accidental oil spill in history. In cooperation with Florida State University, SkyTruth estimated the amount of oil flow from the damaged well using satellite imagery and determined, based on conservative estimates using the visible surface slick, that the flow of oil was between 5 and 25 times greater than BP reported. SkyTruth was the first organization to challenge BP's claims, and continued to monitor and document flow from the well until it was successfully sealed.

== Selected Projects ==
=== FrackFinder ===
SkyTruth's FrackFinder project utilizes public crowd sourcing to map fracking operations on the Marcellus and Utica Shale formations. SkyTruth has mapped out fracking well pads and retainment ponds in Pennsylvania, Ohio, and West Virginia, with further plans to quantify the total impact halos of fracking operations underway. FrackFinder data is publicly available through GitHub. Researchers at Johns Hopkins University used SkyTruth's FrackFinder data to link hydraulic fracturing activity to premature birth, high risk pregnancies, migraines, fatigue, and chronic nasal and sinus symptoms.

=== Global Fishing Watch ===
On September 16, 2015, SkyTruth, in partnership with Google and Oceana, launched Global Fishing Watch. Global Fishing Watch continuously publicizes the locations of hundreds of thousands of vessels via their onboard Automatic Identification Systems so that users can individually track vessels through exclusive economic zones, marine protected areas, and other features. SkyTruth and it partners launched Global Fishing Watch as an independent nonprofit in 2017. It has been used by governments, such as that of Kiribati in 2016, to crack down on illegal fishing and fishing in protected waters.

=== Mountaintop Removal Mining ===
SkyTruth collected data for their initial mountain top removal survey in a partnership with Appalachian Voices, to map the location and growth of mountain top removal (MTR) mines over a 30-year period. It updates data on the extent of mountaintop mining in Central Appalachia annually, and is now monitoring reclamation and revegetation of mined sites as well as coordinating with partners to document the environmental and public health impacts of mountaintop mining]].

=== Oil Spill Monitoring ===
SkyTruth continuously monitors oil spill activity, investigating United States Coast Guard National Response Center reports and calculating estimates of spill volume from confirmed surface slicks. SkyTruth monitors the chronic leak from Taylor Energy site 23501.

=== Oil Pollution from Vessels: Cerulean ===
SkyTruth has developed a machine learning model called Cerulean that scans thousands of satellite images a day to identify oil slicks at sea and link slicks with vessel traffic to identify likely polluters. These slicks typically result from illegal bilge dumping, in which vessels release oily bilge water into marine waters offshore. This model will soon allow law enforcement, local communities, and others to hold polluters accountable for this routine, but illegal activity.

=== Conservation Vision ===
SkyTruth is developing a machine learning and cloud computing initiative known as Conversation Vision to address a range of environmental challenges. The initiative uses satellite imagery and large geospatial datasets, supported by advances in satellite data availability and cloud-based computing, to monitor and analyze environmental change.

== See also ==
- Environmental monitoring
- Geographic information system
- Environmental protection
