= Climate change policy of California =

As the most populous state in the United States, California's climate policies influence both global climate change and federal climate policy. In line with the views of climate scientists, the state of California has progressively passed emission-reduction legislation.

California has taken legislative steps in the hope of mitigating the risks of potential effects of climate change in California by incentives and plans for clean cars, renewable energy, and pollution controls on industry. In California, climate change policy has been developed through both the executive and legislative branches of the state government. Many of the policies have specifically targeted greenhouse gas emissions, which have been shown to raise global temperatures and skew natural rhythms.

One of the most notable pieces of climate legislation in California was Assembly Bill 32, the Global Warming Solutions Act of 2006. This landmark piece of legislation required many actors in California's economy to reduce their greenhouse gas emissions to 1990 levels by 2020. The bill also appointed the California Air Resources Board (CARB) to devise policies and mechanisms for reaching the goal. CARB ultimately implemented the state's cap-and-trade program, a type of emissions trading, the first such program in the United States. California was able to reach the emissions target four years ahead of schedule, in 2016.

Though Texas and California generate the most wind + solar power of all states, various other states generate more wind + solar power per capita.

California (the world's fifth largest economy) has long been seen as the state-level pioneer in environmental issues related to global warming and has shown some leadership in the last four years. On July 22, 2002, Governor Gray Davis approved AB 1493, a bill directing the California Air Resources Board to develop standards to achieve the maximum feasible and cost-effective reduction of greenhouse gases from motor vehicles. Now the California Vehicle Global Warming law, it requires automakers to reduce emissions by 30% by 2016. Although it has been challenged in the courts by the automakers, support for the law is growing as other states have adopted similar legislation. On September 7, 2002, Governor Davis approved a bill requiring the California Climate Action Registry to adopt procedures and protocols for project reporting and carbon sequestration in forests. (SB 812. Approved by Governor Davis on September 7, 2002) California has convened an interagency task force, housed at the California Energy Commission, to develop these procedures and protocols. Staff are currently seeking input on a host of technical questions.

In June 2005, Governor Arnold Schwarzenegger signed an executive order calling for the following reductions in state greenhouse gas emissions: to reduce GHG emissions to 2000 levels by 2010, to reduce GHG emissions to 1990 levels by 2020, to reduce GHG emissions to 80 percent below 1990 levels by 2050. Measures to meet these targets include tighter automotive emissions standards, and requirements for renewable energy as a proportion of electricity production. The Union of Concerned Scientists has calculated that by 2020, drivers would save $26 billion per year if California's automotive standards were implemented nationally.

On August 30, 2006, Schwarzenegger and the California Legislature reached an agreement on AB32, the Global Warming Solutions Act. He signed the bill into law on September 27, 2006, saying, "We simply must do everything we can in our power to slow down global warming before it is too late... The science is clear. The global warming debate is over." The Act caps California's greenhouse gas emissions at 1990 levels by 2020, and institutes a mandatory emissions reporting system to monitor compliance, representing the first enforceable statewide program in the U.S. to cap all GHG emissions from major industries that includes penalties for non-compliance. It required the State Air Resources Board to establish a program for statewide greenhouse gas emissions reporting and to monitor and enforce compliance with this program, authorizes the state board to adopt market-based compliance mechanisms including cap-and-trade, and allows a one-year extension of the targets under extraordinary circumstances. Thus far, flexible mechanisms in the form of project based offsets have been suggested for five main project types. A carbon project would create offsets by showing that it has reduced carbon dioxide and equivalent gases. The project types include: manure management, forestry, building energy, SF_{6}, and landfill gas capture.

Additionally, on September 26, Governor Schwarzenegger signed SB 107, which requires California's three major biggest utilities – Pacific Gas & Electric, Southern California Edison, and San Diego Gas & Electric – to produce at least 20% of their electricity using renewable sources by 2010. This shortens the time span originally enacted by Gov. Davis in September 2002 to increase utility renewable energy sales 1% annually to 20% by 2017.

Gov. Schwarzenegger also announced he would seek to work with Prime Minister Tony Blair of Great Britain, and various other international efforts to address global warming, independently of the federal government.

== Legislation overview ==
See California Climate Executive Orders for a detailed outline of executive orders signed by California governors that focus on climate change.

California lawmakers are among leaders in the U.S. in enacting climate change policy. Starting in the early 2000s, several executive orders focused on climate change were signed by California governors. The California State Legislature has passed numerous bills to enact the changes and regulations that were necessary to meet the goals outlined in executive orders. These policies address issues in emissions measurement, transportation, waste, and energy in California.

Climate change is driven by the accelerated amount of greenhouse gas emissions being put into the atmosphere by anthropogenic activity. To combat climate change, national and state governments around the world are struggling to control their emissions levels. Setting emissions reductions goals and using effective emissions-measurement technology is necessary to reduce emissions and keep track of progress across time. According to the 2022 IPCC report, the world needs to cut its emissions in half by the year 2030 to limit warming to 1.5^{o} Celsius. The California legislative body has been paying attention to the importance of cutting emissions ever since the 2000s.

=== SB 1771 (2000) ===
This bill created the California Climate Action Registry, however this organization officially closed in December 2010 and is encouraging its members to report their emissions to the Climate Registry instead.

=== SB 527 (2001) ===
SB 527 was approved in October 2001, authorizing the California Air Resources Board to impose administrative penalties instead of civil penalties for violations of regulations to air pollution control, with a limit of 10,000 per day and 100,000 total. Before this bill was enacted, the California Air Resources Board had to rely on enforcement of their penalties of violations on air pollution regulations through an action by the Attorney General, now they would have the ability to assess and enforce administrative penalties. The California Climate Action Registry is required to record voluntary greenhouse gas emission reductions made by California entities after 1990, but many of its functions were changed with the passage of SB 527 including; ensuring the public can comment on board meetings, requiring protocols for monitoring and reporting emissions to be consistent with California Energy Commission protocols, and remove the requirement to report nationwide emissions in order to focus solely on in-state emissions.

=== AB 32 (2006) ===
In September 2006, the California State Legislature passed AB 32, the Global Warming Solutions Act of 2006 with the goal of reducing man-made California greenhouse gas emissions (1.4% of global emissions in 2004) back to 1990 emission levels by 2020. The responsibility for implementing, enforcing, and monitoring progress to meet the emission goals was placed on the California Air Resources Board (CARB). Due to the extensive involvement of environmental justice groups, a cap and trade emission scheme was not specifically mandated.

Environmental justice proponents advocate for the reversal of the historical trend of dumping pollution on BIPOC, low-income, Hispanic and Latino communities. Communities of color are significantly more likely to live near major polluters, which emit both GHGs and particulate matter into the surrounding air. Environmental justice advocates assert that a cap-and-trade program does not call for sufficient protections for historically marginalized communities. Instead, it allows leaders the flexibility to act on the global issue of climate change without adequately addressing the more local issue of air pollution.

Due to these concerns, decisions on what system would be most effective were left up to CARB, with mandated review and revision every five years. This granted CARB enough programmatic flexibility to successfully meet the emission reduction mandate. The emissions goal was reached in 2016, four years ahead of the 2020 deadline.

In order to reach emission reduction goals, the California Air Resources Board has adopted a variety of legislation including plans for greener transportation, waste reduction, a cap-and-trade program, the use of new energy efficient technology and the expansion of renewable energy resources.

The greenhouse gases that AB 32 targets include:

- Carbon dioxide
- Methane
- Nitrous oxide
- Hydrofluorocarbons
- Perfluorocarbons
- Sulfur hexafluoride
- Nitrogen trifluoride (was not included in the original AB scoping plan but was later listed as a targeted greenhouse gas via legislation)

The emissions target of AB 32 has been updated to a stricter target following Executive Order B-16-12 and B-30-15. Therefore, updates of the AB 32 Scoping Plan continue to introduce new measures in order to reduce greenhouse gas emissions even further.

Funding for the implementation of AB 32 is collected from greenhouse gas emitters. This includes approximately 250 fee payers from polluters such as electric power plants, oil refineries, cement plants, and other large industries. In addition, the revenue collected from auctioning permits to greenhouse gas emitters through the cap-and-trade system is also used to fund programs under AB 32.

==== Scoping plan ====
Development of the scoping plan is a central requirement of AB 32, which is a bill that calls on California to reduce its greenhouse gas emissions to 1990 levels by 2020. The required Scoping Plan is intended to outline the approach California will take to reduce its greenhouse gas emissions. The comprehensive approach includes both new and existing measures in almost every sector of California's economy.

The initial AB 32 scoping plan included a series of proposals that would become law in 2008. The initiatives include implementing a cap-and-trade program on carbon dioxide emissions (that will be developed in conjunction with the Western Climate Initiative, to create a regional carbon market) that will require buildings and appliances to use less energy. Additionally, it requires oil companies to make cleaner fuels, and utilities to provide a third of their energy from renewable sources like wind, solar and geothermal power and proposes to expand and strengthen existing energy efficiency programs. California's Renewable Portfolio Standard created in 2002 through SB 1078, requires electricity providers to use renewable energy for a specified portion of their electricity, which under SB 100 has increased to 44% by 2024, 52% by 2027 and 60% by 2030. The Plan will also encourage development of walkable cities with shorter commutes, high-speed rail as an alternative to air travel, and will require more hybrid vehicles to move goods and people, following the implementation of the California Clean Car law (the Pavley standards).

California has also implemented climate-smart agriculture programs including the Healthy Soils Program, the Alternative Manure Management Program, the Sustainable Agricultural Lands Conservation Program, and the State Water Efficiency and Enhancement Program, which all aim to reduce the greenhouse gas emissions produced from agriculture, which include 8% of the states total greenhouse gas emissions and most of the nitrous oxide emissions as well. In addition, the California Green Building Standards Code was implemented in 2009 aiming to reduce the near 25% of the states greenhouse gas emissions from commercial and residential buildings. However, these efficiency standards only apply to new or renovated buildings, leaving existing buildings to fall short of the reduced emission goals of AB 32.

Several additional initiatives and measures factor into reaching the required reductions under AB 32. These include:

- full deployment of the Million Solar Roofs initiative.
- a fuel efficiency tire program which sets standards for tire pressure and purchasing replacement tires
- water-related energy efficiency measures; and
- a range of regulations to reduce emissions from trucks and from ships docked in California ports.

A key feature of the scoping plan is that it must be updated by the California Air Resources Board every five years. This is to ensure that California can continue reducing greenhouse gas emissions as the government sets stricter standards in recent years (as seen by Executive Order B-16-12 which was issued in 2012 and aims to reduce emissions 80% below 1990 levels by 2050). Multiple public workshops are held every time a new scoping plan is proposed, so that the Board can receive feedback from the public before approving the updated plan. The first update to the scoping plan was approved by the board on May 22, 2014, and builds upon the original scoping plan by outlining new initiatives and recommendations. The update identifies possibilities to invest new and existing funds in low carbon technologies and other opportunities to continue reducing greenhouse gas emissions below 1990 levels in the next five years. These proposed measures focus on nine main sectors including transportation, water, energy, waste management, the cap-and-trade program, the energy efficiency of residential and non-residential buildings, and natural and agricultural lands.

=== Other notable climate change ===
- SB 375 (2008)
- SB 535 (2012)
- SB 1204 (2014)
- SB 1275 (2014)
- SB 1383 (2016)

== Transportation ==
According to the EPA, transportation is the sector with the largest contribution to US greenhouse gas emissions, emitting 27% of the nation's total volume. Vehicles run on fossil fuel burning internal combustion engines, so California legislation is starting to incentivize consumers to invest in cleaner transportation powered by renewables.

=== AB 1493 (2002) ===
It is the successor bill to AB 1058, was enacted on July 22, 2002, by Governor Gray Davis and mandates that the California Air Resources Board (CARB) develop and implement greenhouse gas limits for vehicles beginning in model year 2009. Subsequently, as directed by AB 1493, the CARB on September 24, 2004, approved regulations limiting the amount of greenhouse gas that may be released from new passenger cars, SUVs and pickup trucks sold in California in model year 2009. The automotive industry has sued, claiming this is simply a way to impose gas mileage standards on automobiles—a field already preempted by federal rules. The CARB staff's analysis has concluded that the new rules will result in savings for vehicle buyers through lower fuel expenses that will more than offset the increased initial costs of new vehicles. Critics claim that these will only work if serious reductions are made in automobile and truck sizes.

California standard uses grams per mile average CO_{2}-equivalent value, which means that emissions of the various greenhouse gases are weighted to take into account their differing impact on climate change (i.e. maximum 323 g/mi (200 g/km) in 2009 and 205 g/mi (127 g/km) in 2016 for passenger cars).

A federal district court ruled on December 12, 2007, that the state and federal laws could co-exist, but on December 19, the EPA denied California's request for the necessary waiver to implement its law, saying the local emissions had little effect on global warming, and that the conditions in California were not "compelling and extraordinary" as required by law. California intends to sue the EPA to force reconsideration, given the precedent of Massachusetts v. EPA, which ruled that carbon dioxide was an air pollutant which EPA had authority to regulate. Arizona, Colorado, Connecticut, Florida, Maine, Maryland, Massachusetts, New Jersey, New Mexico, New York, Oregon, Pennsylvania, Rhode Island, Utah, Vermont, and Washington are also interested in adopting California's automobile emissions standards.

=== SB 375 (2008) ===
Sustainable Communities and Climate Protection Act of 2008, also known as SB 375, which required urban planners to limit urban sprawl

=== SB 1204 (2014) ===
This bill created the California Clean Truck, Bus and Off-Road Vehicle and Equipment Technology program to fund zero and near-zero emission technologies using some of the Greenhouse Gas Reduction Fund.

=== SB 1275 (2014) ===
This bill created the Charge Ahead California Initiative program with the goals of; placing at least 1 million zero-emission and near-zero-emission vehicles into service by January 1, 2023, especially in low-income communities to ensure that these vehicles are a "viable mainstream option".

==== Alternative Fuel Vehicle Incentive Program ====
The Alternative Fuel Vehicle Incentive Program (abbreviated as AFVIP, also known as Fueling Alternatives) is funded by the California Air Resources Board (CARB), offered throughout the state of California and administered by the California Center for Sustainable Energy (CCSE), established with AB 118. A total of $25 million was appropriated to promote the use and production of vehicles capable of running on alternative fuels. Such alternative energy sources include compressed natural gas and electricity via all-electric vehicles and Plug-in hybrid electric vehicles (PHEV).

Vehicles using alternative fuels include Global Electric Motorcars, Vectrix, and ZAP vehicles. The 2008 Tesla Roadster and 2008 ZENN neighborhood electric vehicle are also on the list of vehicles eligible for rebates under the Fueling Alternatives.

==== PHEV Research Center ====
The PHEV Research Center was launched with fundings from the California Air Resources Board. Fueling Alternatives includes, among others, Global Electric Motorcars, Vectrix and ZAP vehicles. The 2008 Tesla Roadster and 2008 ZENN neighborhood electric vehicle have been added to the list of vehicles eligible for rebates under the Fueling Alternatives.

==== Labeling of new vehicles for sale ====
Since January 2009, all new vehicles sold in California have been required to be labeled with a California Air Resources Board window sticker showing both a Smog Score and a Global Warming Score. The scores are on a 1–10 scale, with 5 being average and with 10 being the best (i.e., emitting the least carbon dioxide). Data comes from the U.S. Environmental Protection Agency.

== Waste ==
=== SB 812 (2002) ===
SB 812 was passed in 2014 requiring changes to the Department of Toxic Substance Controls permit approval for hazardous waste facilities including; requiring owners of a hazardous waste facility to submit both a Part A and Part B application for permit renewal at least 2 years before the expiration date of their current permit instead of only 6 months, and requires that the owner of a hazardous waste facility submit a written cost estimate associated with corrective action for hazardous waste under specified circumstances.

=== SB 1383 (2016) ===
SB 1383, officially named California's Short-Lived Climate Pollutant Reduction Law, was passed in 2016 by Governor Brown as an effort to reduce methane emissions released from decomposing organic waste. Methane is one of four well-known short-lived climate pollutants. These are greenhouse gasses that have a shorter lifetime than carbon dioxide in the atmosphere, but have a substantially higher global warming potential than carbon dioxide. Specifically, methane is 28–34 times more potent than carbon dioxide.

The new law regulates rates of organic waste disposal and food rescue.

- Compared to 2014 levels, the law mandates that organic waste disposal in landfills must be cut in half by 2020, and 75% by 2025. Instead of ending up at the landfill, organic waste would be diverted to commercial composting or anaerobic digestion facilities that would capture the methane released.
- To combat the immense amount of edible food that is wasted at grocery stores and food service establishments, the new law is mandating that at least 20% of edible food gets rescued and redistributed by 2025.
- Starting in 2022, all counties are expected to provide organic waste collection services to homes and businesses and transport the waste collected to organic waste facilities.

== Renewable energy ==
=== AB 1007 (2005) ===
Assembly bill (AB) 1007, (Pavley, Chapter 371, Statutes of 2005) requires the California Energy Commission to prepare a state plan to increase the use of alternative fuels in California (Alternative Fuels Plan).

SB 535 was passed in 2012. The bill required that 25% of funding sourced from the GGRF would be allocated to GHG reducing investments that benefitted disadvantaged communities. Another important stipulation was that at least ten percent of the funds had to be invested directly into disadvantaged communities. The responsibility of identifying and locating disadvantaged communities was placed on CalEPA. CalEPA created a tool called CalEnviroScreen in order to map these communities and determine who was most disadvantaged and where funding should be directed. In 2016 AB 1550 was passed in order to expand upon SB 535 and increase the initial 25% investment requirement to 35 percent.

=== SB 100 (2018) ===
SB 100, also known as the 100 Percent Clean Energy Act of 2018, marks California's firm commitment to developing renewable energy infrastructures to replace fossil fuel-powered energy. Its two main goals are:

- by 2030, 60% of all energy generated from will be from renewable sources
- by 2045,100% renewable energy for the whole state

The increasingly affordable costs of wind and solar technologies make these two sources the main focus of renewable energy infrastructure across California.

== Cap and trade ==
In 2018, California spent $1.4 billion raised from its cap and trade program to reduce greenhouse gas emissions, out of $3.4 billion spent cumulatively since 2012; notable projects include California High-Speed Rail and the Clean Vehicle Rebate for low-emission vehicles. Until 2021, the funds are supposed to be used to reduce emissions; however, as of part of the 2019-2020 budget, lawmakers approved a plan to use cap and trade programs for water quality, which raised questions about the connection to global warming.

=== California climate investments ===
California climate investments puts resources of cap and trade auction proceeds to work reducing greenhouse gas emissions, strengthening the economy, improving public health and the environment, and providing meaningful benefits to the most disadvantaged communities, low-income communities, and low-income households.

== Resilience and adaptation ==
In 2020, the Ocean Protection Council released the Strategic Plan to Protect California's Oceans. This agreement sets a five-year action plan with four main goals and with many subtargets: climate change resilience, ocean access and equity, biodiversity, and the blue economy. Targets include adaption to support 3.5 feet of sea level rise by 2050, the restoration of 10000 acres of wetlands by 2025, and managed retreat for public buildings and infrastructure. The plan relies on existing funding sources for its first two years, and a possible half billion out of the $4.75 billion bond led by Governor Gavin Newsom for the rest.

Even as California implemented many mitigation policies in order to reduce greenhouse gas emissions, the pre-existing effects of climate change continued to impact the region, as per a report published in 2015. This could be seen from frequent wildfires, drought and floods. Therefore, the state issued the 2018 update of the Safeguarding California Plan which outlined over 300 ongoing actions by state agencies to reduce the effects of climate change on infrastructure, public safety and the economy.

A few examples of the hundreds of adaptation projects enacted by the state include:

- enhancing the energy efficiency of public school districts
- replacing roofs to prevent damage caused by wildfires
- investing in research on climate change impact models
- reducing the vulnerability of cities' electrical grids to heat waves
- reforestation initiatives
- realigning highways which have been affected by severe coastal erosion; and
- updating irrigation systems

=== Timeline ===
This is a timeline that encompasses the recent greenhouse gas emissions reduction bills currently into law in California:

| Deadline | What needs to happen | Bill |
|---|---|---|
| June 2005 | California Executive Order S-3-05 signed by then Governor Arnold Schwarzenegger establishing a comprehensive greenhouse gas reduction plan | S-3-05 |
| September 2006 | AB-32 (Global Warming Solutions Act of 2006) signed into law by then Governor Arnold Schwarzenegger establishing GHG reduction goals for 2020. | AB-32 |
| January 2008 | CARB adopts Mandatory Reporting Regulation for GHGs | AB-32 |
| January 2009 | CARB adopts Scoping Plan | AB-32 |
| January 2010 | Early action measures go into effect | AB-32 |
| During 2010 | CARB writes rules to adopt GHG regulations | AB-32 |
| December 2010 | Deadline to reduce GHG emissions to 2000 levels | S-3-05 |
| January 2011 | CARB completes rule makings for GHG reduction | AB-32 |
| January 2012 | GHG rules adopted and implemented | AB-32 |
| November 2012 | First quarterly auction of GHG emissions as part of Cap and Trade program occur | AB-32 |
| January 2013 | Cap and Trade program begins | AB-32 |
| September 2013 | CARB issues first carbon offset credits | AB-32 |
| May 2014 | CARB approves first update to the Scoping Plan | AB-32 |
| April 2015 | California Executive Order B-30-15 is signed into law by Governor Jerry Brown | B-30-15 |
| September 2016 | Senate Bill 32 and Assembly Bill 197 are signed into law by Governor Jerry Brown | SB-32, AB-197 |
| January 2017 | SB-32 and AB-197 go into effect | SB-32, AB-197 |
| January 2018 | CARB adds toxic air contaminant emission inventory | AB-197 |
| December 2020 | Deadline for reduction of GHG levels to 1990 levels | AB-32, S-3-05 |
| December 2030 | Deadline for reduction of GHG emissions to 40% below 1990 levels | SB-32, B-30-15 |
| December 2050 | Deadline for reduction of GHG emissions to 80% below 1990 levels | S-3-05 |

== See also ==
- California Environmental Protection Agency
- CoolCalifornia.org
- Pollution in California
- Effects of global warming
- Plug-in electric vehicles in California
