= California's 27th district =

California's 27th district may refer to:

- California's 27th congressional district
- California's 27th State Assembly district
- California's 27th State Senate district
