= Climate registry =

The following articles relate to the topic climate registry

- The California Climate Action Registry
- The Climate Registry in North America
