= Robert Roy Cunningham =

American politician

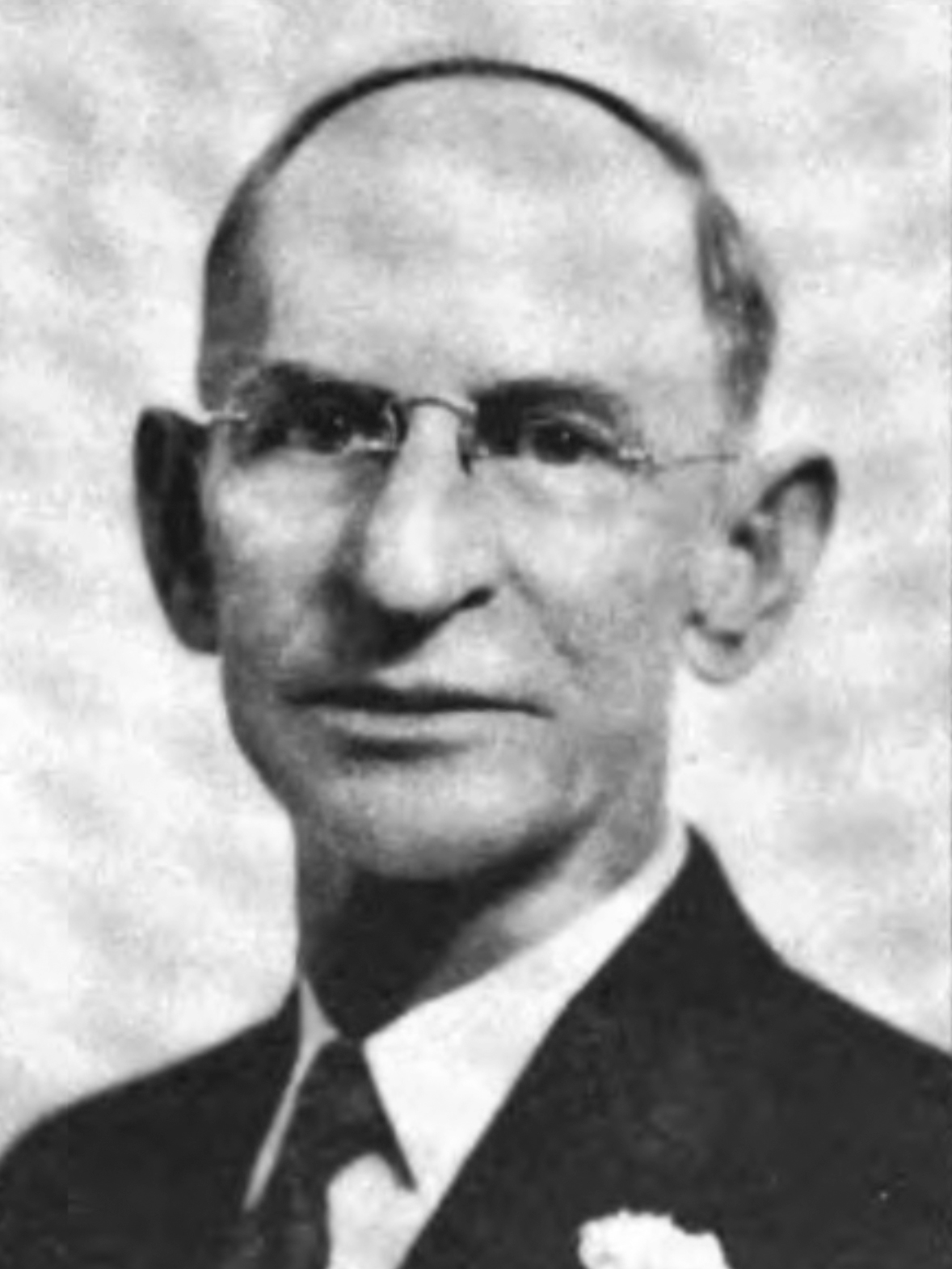

Member of the California Senate from the 27th district
- In office January 4, 1937 – January 5, 1953
- Preceded by: Charles King
- Succeeded by: Robert I. Montgomery

Personal details
- Born: December 6, 1876 Sherman, Texas, U.S.
- Died: October 11, 1958 (aged 81) California, U.S.
- Party: Democratic

Military service
- Branch/service: United States Army
- Battles/wars: Spanish–American War

Robert Roy Cunningham (December 6, 1876 – October 11, 1958) served in the California State Senate for the 27th district from 1937 to 1953 and during the Spanish–American War he served in the United States Army.
