= Henry Stern (California politician) =

American politician

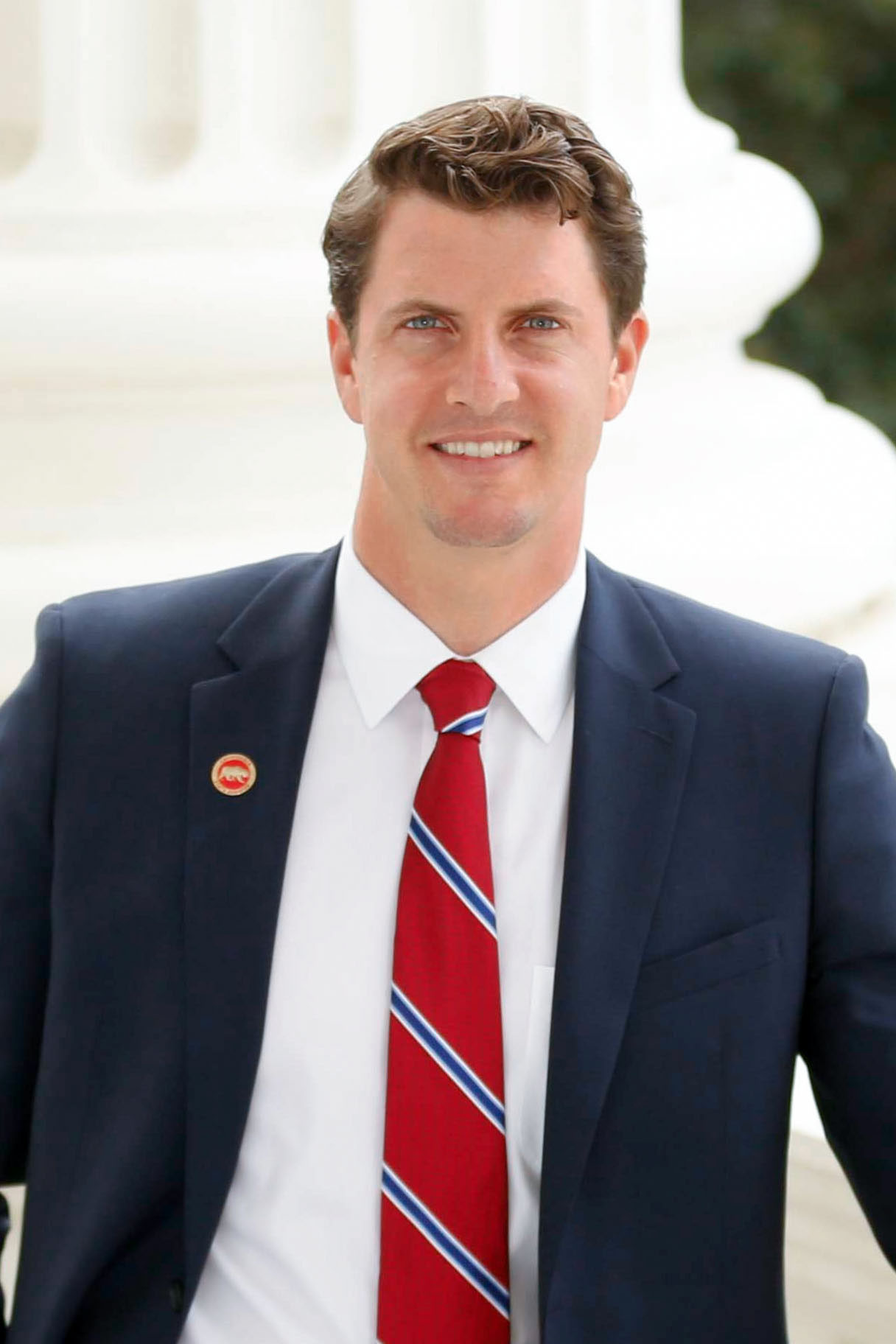
- Official portrait, 2016

Member of the California Senate from the 27th district
- Incumbent
- Assumed office December 5, 2016
- Preceded by: Fran Pavley

Personal details
- Born: Henry Isaac Stern; April 12, 1982 (age 44) Malibu, California, U.S.
- Party: Democratic
- Spouse: Alexandra Kaufman
- Children: 2
- Parent: Daniel Stern (father)
- Relatives: David M. Stern (uncle)
- Education: Harvard University(BA); UC Berkeley School of Law (JD)
- Occupation: Politician
- Profession: Environmental attorney
- Website: Campaign website

Henry Isaac Stern (born April 12, 1982) is an American politician and member of the California State Senate. He is a Democrat representing the 27th district, encompassing parts of Los Angeles and Ventura counties. He was elected in November 2016. Prior to being elected to the State Senate, he was an environmental attorney and senior advisor to his predecessor Fran Pavley. He is the first millennial elected to the California State Senate. He was also an American law lecturer at the University of California, Los Angeles and UC Berkeley.

Stern has served as counsel to Representative Henry Waxman on the House Energy & Commerce Committee to help construct clean energy projects for businesses. He has also taught civics, founded a tech incubator, and advocated for juvenile justice.

== Early life and education ==
Henry Isaac Stern was born to a Jewish family in Malibu, California on April 12, 1982. His father is actor Daniel Stern, who is best known for his role as Marv Murchins in the films Home Alone and Home Alone 2: Lost in New York.

A former high school and collegiate water polo player, Stern graduated from Harvard University. He went on to graduate from the UC Berkeley School of Law, before becoming an environmental attorney.

== California State Senate (2016–) ==
=== Election ===
Henry Stern represented the Democratic Party in the 2016 race for California's 27th State Senate district against Republican Steve Fazio. On November 8, 2016, he was elected to the seat.

Stern ran on a platform of five main issues in the 2016 elections. These included standing up to oil and gas companies; fighting to create incentives for companies to create "clean transportation and renewable energy infrastructure;" improving the economy with small businesses, clean technology, good-paying jobs and job training; supporting education by securing funding; and creating safer communities by providing funding to local governments.

During the 2016 election, Stern was endorsed by Senator Fran Pavley, the Sierra Club, the California League of Conservation Voters, teachers and school board members from Los Angeles and Ventura county school districts, the Association of Los Angeles County Sheriffs, and the California Association of Highway Patrolmen. He was endorsed by elected officials such as President Barack Obama and Governor Jerry Brown, among many more. Publications such as the Ventura County Star and Ventura County Signal endorsed him as well.

== Los Angeles County Board of Supervisors election ==
Stern announced his candidacy for the District 3 seat on the Los Angeles County Board of Supervisors in 2022. On June 22, Stern conceded the race after receiving 24% of the vote in the June 7 primary.

== In popular culture ==
Henry's father, Daniel Stern, performed the narrative voiceover of adult Kevin Arnold for the hit television series The Wonder Years for six seasons. At the end of the show's series finale, Henry delivered the next-to-last line of the entire series when he called to his father—in voiceover—"Hey Dad, wanna play catch?" to which his father replies "I'll be right there."

== Electoral history ==
2016 California State Senate 27th district election
Primary election
Party	Candidate	Votes	%
Republican	Steve Fazio	77,770	37.1
Democratic	Henry Stern	57,189	27.3
Democratic	Janice Kamenir-Reznik	40,250	19.2
Democratic	David Pollock	15,359	7.3
Democratic	Shawn Bayliss	12,757	6.1
Democratic	George Christopher Thomas	6,143	2.9
Total votes		209,468	100.0
General election
Democratic	Henry Stern	218,655	55.9
Republican	Steve Fazio	172,827	44.1
Total votes		377,256	100.0
Democratic hold			

2020 California State Senate 27th district election
Primary election
Party	Candidate	Votes	%
Democratic	Henry Stern (incumbent)	158,184	63.8
Republican	Houman Salem	89,646	36.2
Total votes		247,830	100.0
General election
Democratic	Henry Stern (incumbent)	284,797	60.2
Republican	Houman Salem	188,421	39.8
Total votes		473,218	100.0
Democratic hold			

2024 California State Senate 27th district election
Primary election
Party	Candidate	Votes	%
Democratic	Henry Stern (incumbent)	98,160	44.1
Republican	Lucie Volotzky	84,758	38.1
Democratic	Susan A. Collins	39,488	17.8
Total votes		222,406	100.0
General election
Democratic	Henry Stern (incumbent)	270,005	59.5
Republican	Lucie Volotzky	183,967	40.5
Total votes		453,972	100.0
Democratic hold			
