= The Blindness of Love =

- Directed by: Charles Horan; Edna G. Riley (A.D.)
- Screenplay by: Harry O. Hoyt; Ruth Comfort Mitchell
- Starring: Julius Steger; George Le Guere; Grace Valentine
- Distributed by: Metro Pictures Corporation
- Release date: 6 March 1916 (USA)

The Blindness of Love is a five-reel silent film directed by Charles Horan from a screenplay by Harry O. Hoyt and Ruth Comfort Mitchell.

== Plot ==
Julius Steger plays a wealthy old piano maker named Joseph who is blindly devoted to his trouble-making adult son.

== Cast ==
- Julius Steger as Joseph Wilton
- George Le Guere
- Grace Valentine
