= Ruth Comfort Mitchell Young =

American poet and writer (1882-1954)

Ruth Comfort Mitchell
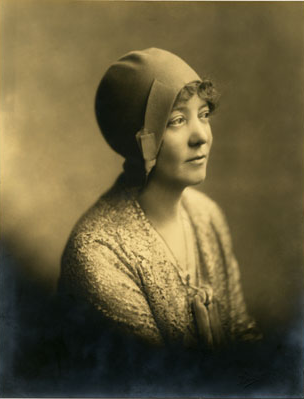
- Born: July 21, 1882; San Francisco, California, USA
- Died: February 18, 1954 (aged 71); Los Gatos, California, USA
- Occupations: Playwright; author; screenwriter
- Spouse: Sanborn Young (m. 1914)

Ruth Comfort Mitchell Young (July 21, 1882 – February 18, 1954) was an American writer and playwright, best known for her novel, Of Human Kindness. She wrote under her maiden name Ruth Comfort Mitchell, as well as her married name, Mrs. Sanborn Young. She was the wife of California State Senator Sanborn Young. Several of her stories were made into films.

== Early life and education ==
Mitchell was born in San Francisco, California, July 21, 1882. Born to wealth, her father being a successful hotelier, she spent summers in the town of Los Gatos, where her parents and grandparents had summer homes. Educated at mostly at home, she took some schooling at a school then known as the Irving Institute.

Her first poem was published in the Los Gatos Mail, when she was only 14, launching her literary career. She travelled widely as a young woman, including 18 months in Europe, along with long trips in Mexico and Canada.

In 1914, literary friends in San Francisco introduced her to Sanborn Young, who had recently sold his grain business and was traveling. The couple were married in October 1914 in the Grand Canyon and moved to New York City, where Ruth continued her literary pursuits, and he studied photography.

== Career ==
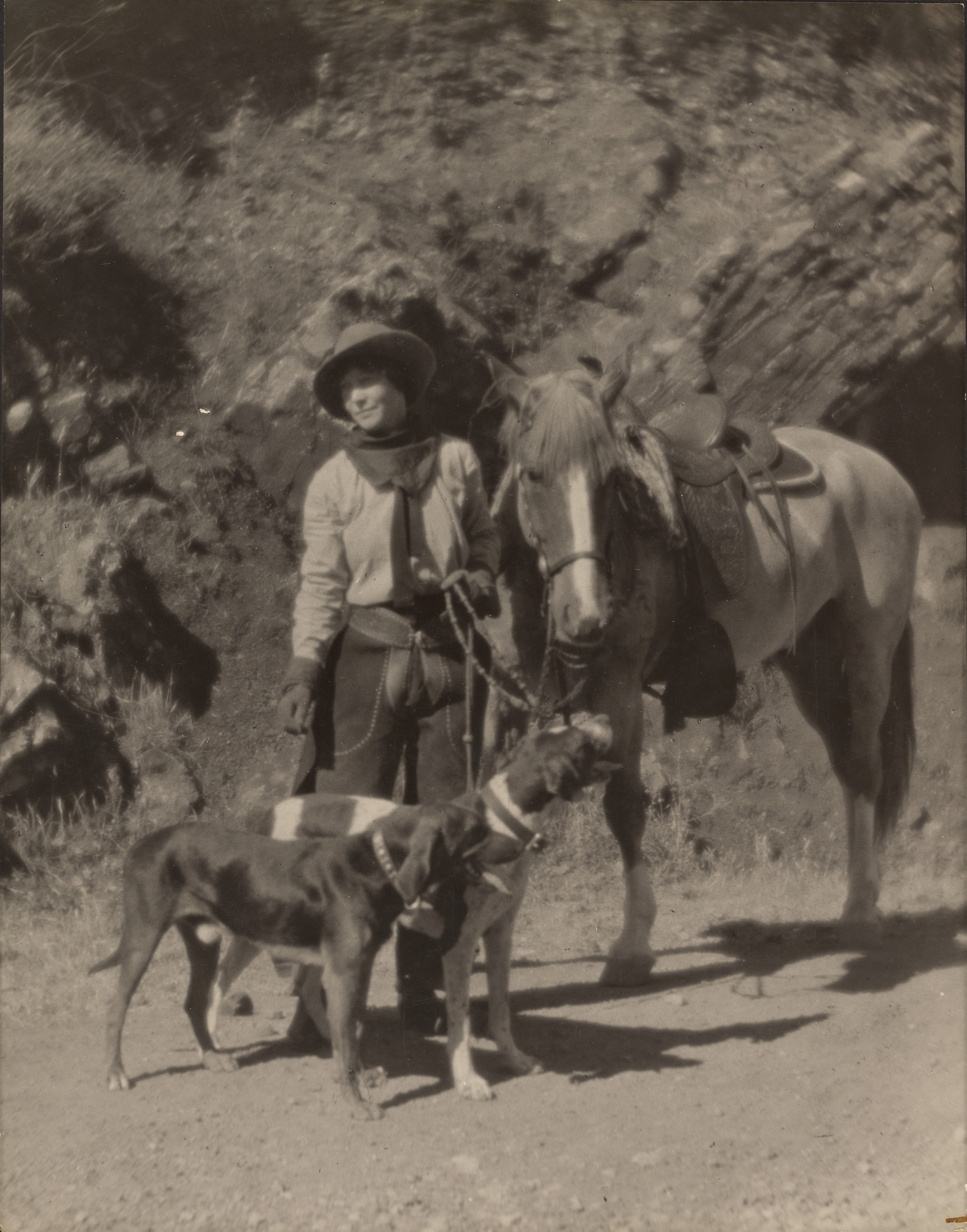
Ruth Comfort Mitchell, circa 1924

Mitchell enjoyed a long career as a writer; authoring 16 novels, along with poems, short stories, and one-act plays. New York Times reviews were positive about her works, regarding them as "light fiction" and "as romantic as possible."

Her short stories appeared in Ladies' Home Journal and Woman's Home Companion and she openly aimed for a female audience. One of her plays, The Sweetmeat Game (1916) was set in San Francisco's Chinatown and inspired her to design her home, known as the Yung See San Fong House, in a Chinese style. Today the house is protected under the Historic American Buildings Survey.

Mitchell's later work was dominated by a series of historically informed fiction, including The Legend of Susan Dane, set in pre-Union San Jose.

Her 1940 book, Of Human Kindness —in strong contrast to John Steinbeck and his novel The Grapes of Wrath—gave a positive vision of industrial agriculture in the 20th Century. She considered Steinbeck's work to have defamed her beloved state. It is considered her finest work. A keen outdoorswoman, Mitchell took great joy from keeping dogs and horseback riding to Big Sur.

=== Nobel Prize in Literature ===
In 1941, Mitchell was nominated by Victor W. Bennett, a professor of English and history at the University of Maryland, Baltimore, and Benjamin B. Biesel, a professor of history at Cornell University, Ithaca, New York. During the deliberations, the Nobel Committee was said to be "content to give a brief idea of the absurdity of [her] only published work and thus also of the absurdity of a prize proposal, for which there were not many parallels in the Committee's papers."

== Personal life ==
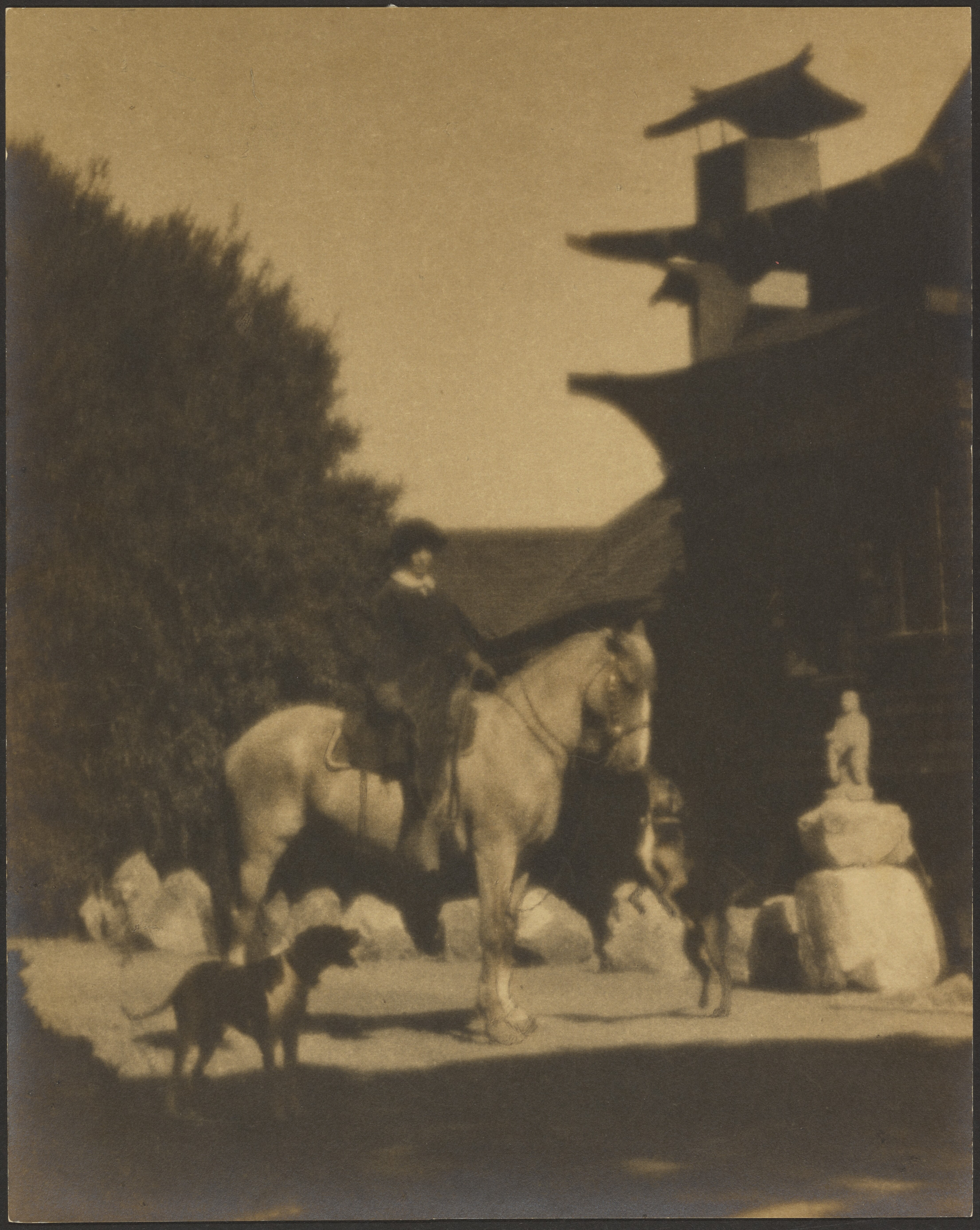
Ruth Comfort Mitchell by her home in Los Gatos

Because of her fame, many of the literati visited her home. The Youngs were known to be friendly with W. C. Morrow, Robert W. Service, Gertrude Atherton, James Phelan, Gertrude Stein and Wendell Willkie. Ruth was very involved with the annual Los Gatos Pageant, the Los Gatos Christian Science Church, the Daughters of the American Revolution, and the Los Gatos History Club.

With her husband, the couple took a keen interest in politics. She campaigned for Hoover, while her husband became an anti-drugs and conservation campaigner, eventually serving three terms in the California State Senate. Ruth served as Republican National Committeewoman from California for eight years and as national and state president of Pro-America, an organization of Republican women founded in 1933.

In February 1954, she died from heart failure, while taking a bath at home. Her husband living a further ten years.

== Writings ==
- The Night Court and Other Verse (1916)
- Play the Game! (1921)
- Jane Journeys On (1922)
- Corduroy (1923)
- Narratives in Verse (1923)
- A White Stone (1924)
- The Wishing Carpet (1926)
- Call of the House (1927)
- Army With Banners (1928)
- Water (1931)
- The Legend of Susan Dane (1933)
- Old San Francisco Fire! (The Fifties) (1933)
- Strait Gate (1935)
- His wife could eat no lean (Contemporary California short stories) (1937)
- Of Human Kindness (1940)
- Dust of Mexico (1941)
- They shall Come Again (1944)

== Filmography ==
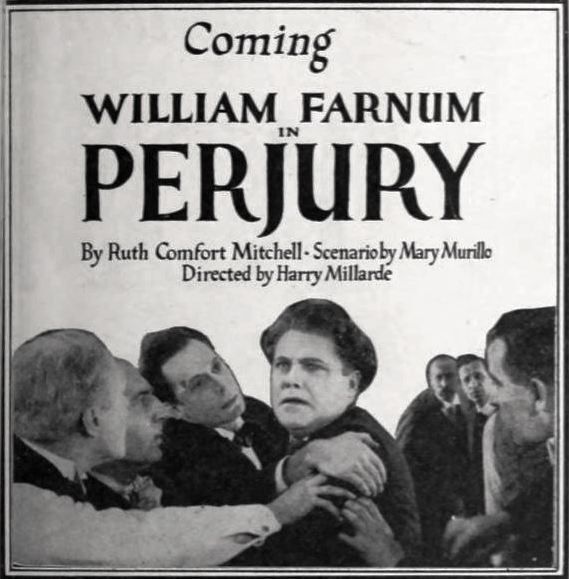

- The Price of Happiness (1916), adaptation from a play
- The Blindness of Love (1916)
- Perjury (1921)
- Into Her Kingdom (1926)
- A Six Shootin' Romance (1926)
