= The Price of Happiness =

1916 film by Edmund Lawrence

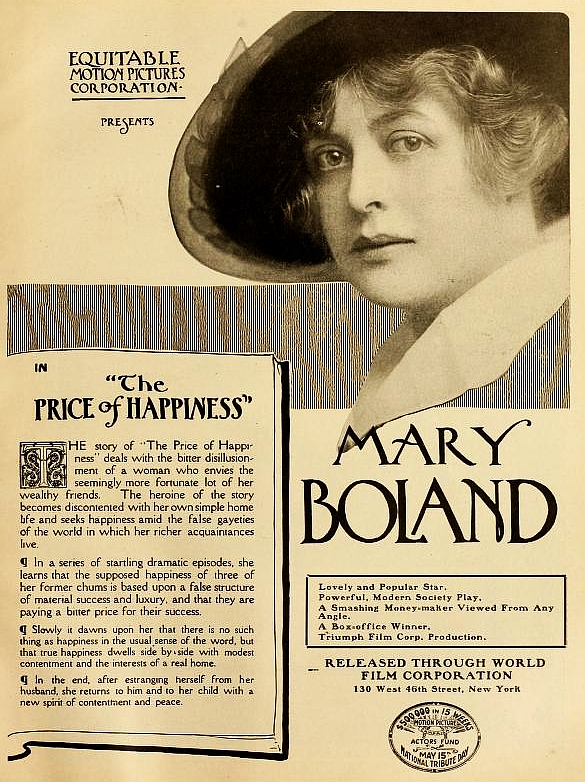
- Directed by: Edmund Lawrence
- Written by: Ruth Comfort Mitchell (adaptation)
- Based on: play, Drei Paar Schue)
- Produced by: Triumph Films
- Starring: Mary Boland
- Distributed by: World Film Company
- Release date: February 28, 1916
- Running time: 5 reels
- Country: USA
- Language: Silent..English titles

The Price of Happiness is a lost 1916 silent film drama directed by Edmund Lawrence and starring Mary Boland. It was distributed through the World Film Company. The film was based on a play called (Drei Paar Schuhe: Three Pairs of Shoes).

== Cast ==
- Mary Boland - Bertha Miller
- Marion Singer - Lucille
- Enid Francis - Ruth Taylor
- Carlotta De Felice - Evelyn Morgan (*billed Carlotta De Felico)
- Albert Bechtel - Max
- David Wall - John Miller (*billed as Dave Wall)
- Adolphe Menjou - Howard Neal
