= The Crystal Gazer =

1917 film by George Melford

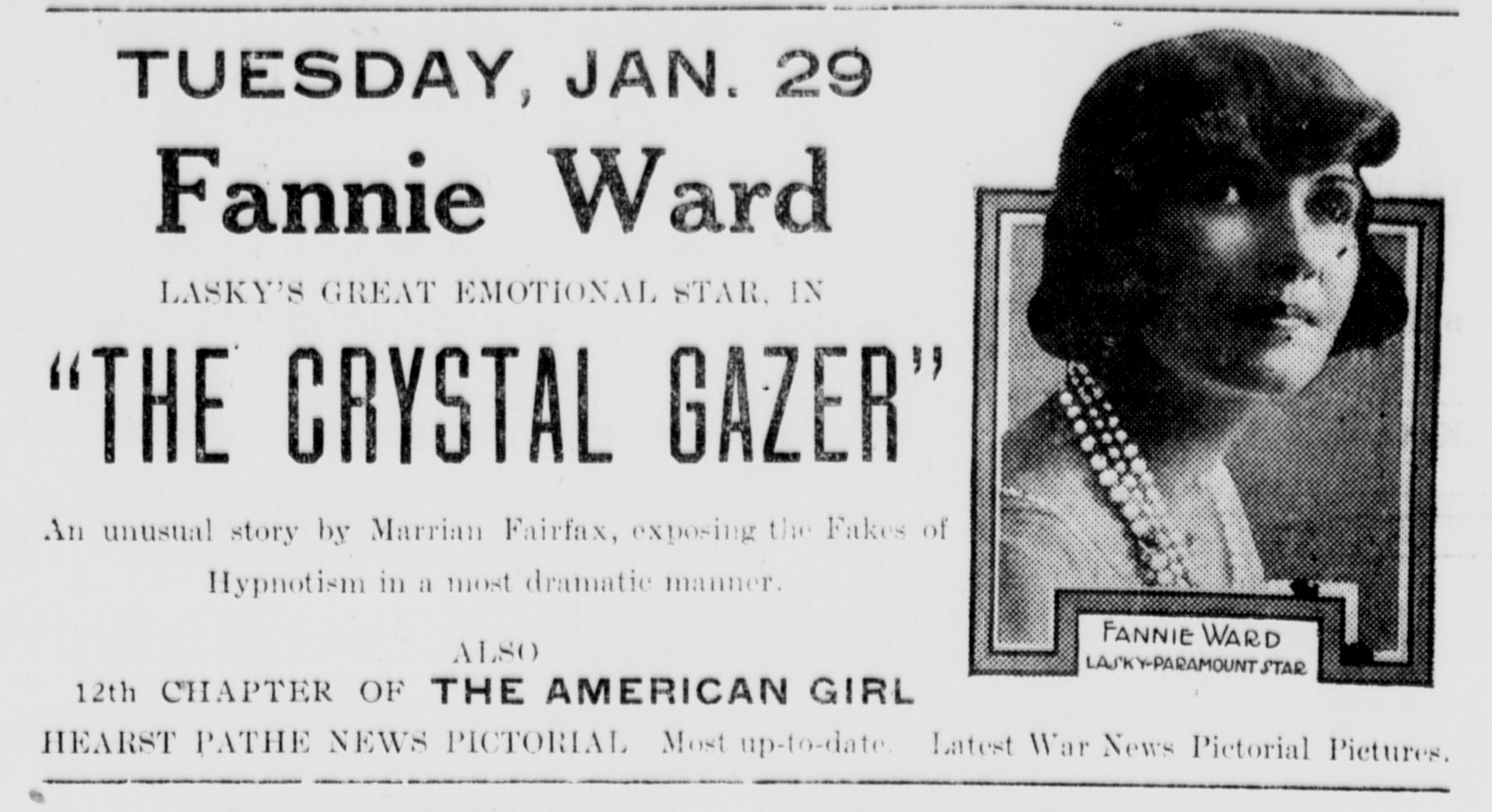
- Contemporary newspaper advertisement
- Directed by: George Melford
- Screenplay by: Eve Unsell; Edna G. Riley; Marion Fairfax
- Produced by: Jesse L. Lasky
- Starring: Fannie Ward; Jack Dean; Winifred Greenwood; Harrison Ford; Raymond Hatton; Edythe Chapman
- Cinematography: Percy Hilburn (French
- Production company: Jesse L. Lasky Feature Play Company
- Distributed by: Paramount Pictures
- Release date: July 30, 1917
- Running time: 50 minutes
- Country: United States
- Language: English

The Crystal Gazer is a lost 1917 American drama silent film directed by George Melford, and written by Eve Unsell, Edna G. Riley, and Marion Fairfax. The film stars Fannie Ward, Jack Dean, Winifred Greenwood, Harrison Ford, Raymond Hatton and Edythe Chapman. The film was released on July 30, 1917, by Paramount Pictures.

== Plot ==
When Rose Jorgensen, who lives in a squalid tenement house, hears that her husband is to be electrocuted, she commits suicide, leaving two young daughters, Rose and Norma. Rose is adopted by Judge and Mrs. Keith and brought up in luxury, while Norma is adopted by a neighbor and raised in squalor. Once grown, Norma is noticed by a hypnotist named Calistro who employs her to be his subject. Calistro becomes a society fad and while at an engagement, he notices the resemblance between Norma and Rose and learns of their past. Calistro confronts Rose with her past, and fearing blackmail, Rose breaks her engagement to wealthy Dick Alden and flees to Bermuda. In her absence, Dick is enthralled by Norma's resemblance to his lost love and offers to marry her, but when Rose returns, Norma learns that Dick still loves her sister. Later, when the building in which Rose is sleeping catches fire, Norma heroically saves her sister and forfeits her life so that Rose may live.

— AFI

== Cast ==
- Fannie Ward as Rose Jorgensen / Rose Keith / Norma Dugan
- Jack Dean as The Great Glen Carter
- Winifred Greenwood as Belle
- Harrison Ford as Dick Alden
- Raymond Hatton as Phil Mannering
- Edythe Chapman as Mrs. Mannering
- Jane Wolfe as Mrs. Dugan
