= Sanborn Young =

American politician (1873-1964)

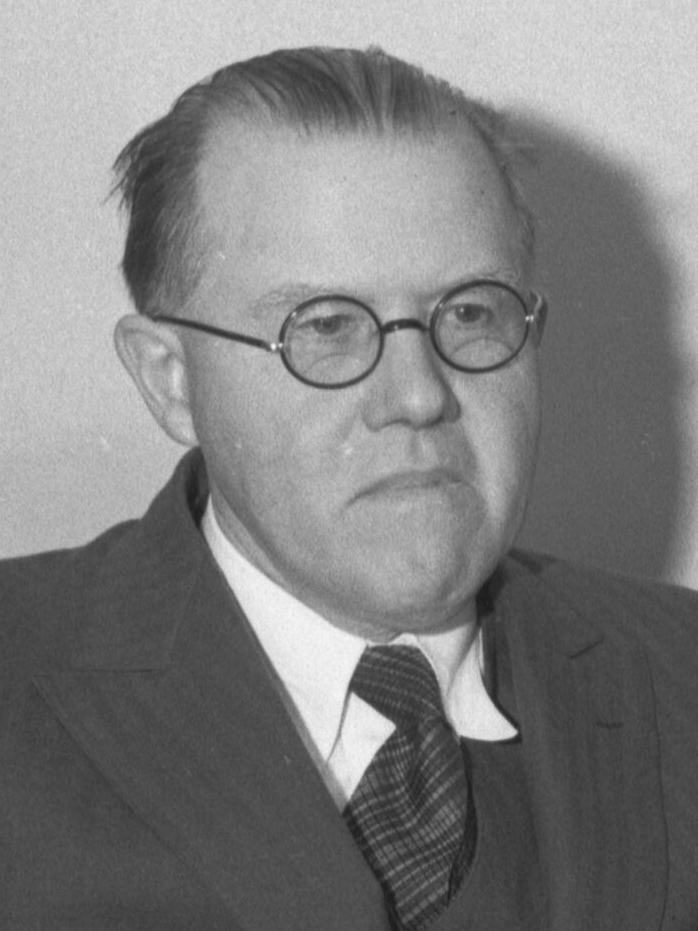
- Young in 1934

Member of the California Senate from the 18th district
- In office January 7, 1935 – January 2, 1939
- Preceded by: Herbert C. Jones
- Succeeded by: John D. Foley

Member of the California Senate from the 27th district
- In office January 5, 1925 – January 2, 1933
- Preceded by: A. E. Osborne
- Succeeded by: Charles King

Personal details
- Born: March 2, 1873 Chicago, Illinois, U.S.
- Died: February 14, 1964 (aged 90) San Mateo, California, U.S.
- Party: Republican
- Spouse: Ruth Comfort Mitchell Young (m. 1914; died 1954)

William Sanborn Young (March 2, 1873 – February 14, 1964) was a California State Senator, best known for being the husband of author Ruth Comfort Mitchell Young.

In 1914, he had recently sold his grain business and was traveling in San Francisco, California, where he was introduced to Ruth. The couple were married in October 1914 in the Grand Canyon and moved to New York City, where Ruth followed her literary pursuits, and he studied photography. They moved back to Los Gatos, California in 1917 upon the completion of their house, known as the Yung See San Fong House.

Sanborn Young devoted his energies to politics, photography, raising racing dogs and beagles, and investments. In 1925 Young was elected to the California State Senate and continued to serve there until 1939. A quiet, retiring man, it is said that he won the seat because of his wife's campaigning. While in the Senate, his primary interests were the conservation of wild animals, and legislating against narcotics. In 1929 his bill to abolish sawtooth traps except for bears was enacted.

In the State Senate, he was head of the Narcotics Committee and introduced legislation to control narcotics. Because of Young's expertise, President Herbert Hoover appointed him as one of the United States delegates to the International Conference for the Limitation of the Manufacture of Drugs in 1931, which was held in Geneva, Switzerland. Attended by fifty-five nations, the resulting treaty was partially drafted by Young.

These political ties resulted in the Youngs becoming friends of the Hoovers, who resided in nearby Palo Alto. Several letters from Hoover to the Youngs indicate that theirs was a close relationship.

Sanborn Young said of his life, "My own claim to fame is that I married Ruth Comfort Mitchell, I became a California State Senator and wrote the narcotics bill, I raised the champion beagle."
