= Southern California Association of Governments =

Planning organization in Southern California

- SCAG

Agency overview
- Formed: October 28, 1965
- Jurisdiction: Regional (Metropolitan planning organization)
- Headquarters: 900 Wilshire Boulevard, Suite 1700, Los Angeles, California 90017
- Website: www.scag.ca.gov

The Southern California Association of Governments (SCAG) is the metropolitan planning organization (MPO) of six of the ten counties in Southern California, serving Imperial County, Los Angeles County, Orange County, Riverside County, San Bernardino County, and Ventura County. San Diego County's MPO is the San Diego Association of Governments, which is an unrelated agency.

SCAG is the largest metropolitan planning organization in the United States, representing over 18.5 million people in an area covering over 38,000 square miles (98,000 km^{2}). As the designated MPO, SCAG is mandated by the federal law to research and plan for transportation, growth management, hazardous waste management, and air quality.

Its mandates at the state level include researching and planning for housing.

== Governance ==
SCAG's policy direction is guided by the 86-member official governing board known as the Regional Council. The Regional Council is composed of 67 Districts that include an elected representative of one or more cities of approximately equal population levels that have a geographic community of interest (except the City of Long Beach, which has two representatives). Additionally, membership in SCAG's Regional Council includes one representative from each county Board of Supervisors (except the County of Los Angeles, which has two representatives). SCAG's Regional Council also includes one representative of the Southern California Native American Tribal Governments. Finally, all members of the Los Angeles City Council are each considered members of the SCAG Regional Council, and the mayor of Los Angeles, serves as the Los Angeles City At-Large Representative.

== SCAG member cities ==
As of December 2014, the SCAG region consists of 191 cities, six counties, and one Tribal Government. Members include:

- Adelanto
- Agoura Hills
- Alhambra
- Aliso Viejo
- Anaheim
- Apple Valley
- Arcadia
- Artesia
- Avalon
- Azusa
- Baldwin Park
- Banning
- Barstow
- Beaumont
- Bell
- Bell Gardens
- Bellflower
- Beverly Hills
- Big Bear Lake
- Blythe
- Bradbury
- Brawley
- Brea
- Buena Park
- Burbank
- Calabasas
- Calexico
- Calimesa
- Calipatria
- Camarillo
- Canyon Lake
- Carson
- Cathedral City
- Cerritos
- Chino
- Chino Hills
- Claremont
- Coachella
- Colton
- Commerce
- Compton
- Corona
- Costa Mesa
- Covina
- Cudahy
- Culver City
- Cypress
- Dana Point
- Desert Hot Springs
- Diamond Bar
- Downey
- Duarte
- Eastvale
- El Centro
- El Monte
- El Segundo
- Fillmore
- Fontana
- Fountain Valley
- Fullerton
- Garden Grove
- Gardena
- Glendale
- Glendora
- Grand Terrace
- Hawaiian Gardens
- Hawthorne
- Hemet
- Hermosa Beach
- Hesperia
- Hidden Hills
- Highland
- Holtville
- Huntington Beach
- Huntington Park
- Imperial
- Indian Wells
- Indio
- Industry
- Inglewood
- Irvine
- Irwindale
- Jurupa Valley
- La Cañada Flintridge
- La Habra
- La Habra Heights
- La Mirada
- La Palma
- La Puente
- La Quinta
- La Verne
- Laguna Beach
- Laguna Hills
- Laguna Niguel
- Laguna Woods
- Lake Elsinore
- Lake Forest
- Lakewood
- Lancaster
- Lawndale
- Loma Linda
- Lomita
- Long Beach
- Los Alamitos
- Los Angeles
- Lynwood
- Malibu
- Manhattan Beach
- Maywood
- Menifee
- Mission Viejo
- Monrovia
- Montclair
- Montebello
- Monterey Park
- Moorpark
- Moreno Valley
- Murrieta
- Needles
- Newport Beach
- Norco
- Norwalk
- Ojai
- Ontario
- Oxnard
- Palm Desert
- Palm Springs
- Palmdale
- Palos Verdes Estates
- Paramount
- Pasadena
- Perris
- Pico Rivera
- Placentia
- Pomona
- Port Hueneme
- Rancho Cucamonga
- Rancho Mirage
- Rancho Palos Verdes
- Redlands
- Redondo Beach
- Rialto
- Riverside
- Rolling Hills
- Rolling Hills Estates
- Rosemead
- San Bernardino
- San Buenaventura
- San Clemente
- San Dimas
- San Fernando
- San Gabriel
- San Jacinto
- San Juan Capistrano
- San Marino
- Santa Ana
- Santa Clarita
- Santa Fe Springs
- Santa Monica
- Santa Paula
- Seal Beach
- Sierra Madre
- Signal Hill
- Simi Valley
- South El Monte
- South Gate
- South Pasadena
- Stanton
- Temecula
- Temple City
- Thousand Oaks
- Torrance
- Tustin
- Twentynine Palms
- Upland
- Vernon
- Victorville
- Villa Park
- Walnut
- West Covina
- West Hollywood
- Westlake Village
- Westminster
- Westmorland
- Whittier
- Wildomar
- Yorba Linda
- Yucaipa
- Yucca Valley
- Pechanga Band of Luiseño Indians

== History ==
The Southern California Association of Governments was formed on October 28, 1965, with the purpose of conducting growth forecasts and regional planning. With each new federal transportation authorization and key state legislation, SCAG’s roles and responsibilities have increased and expanded beyond transportation planning.

In recent years, SCAG has taken a leadership role in goods movement activities and its impact on the Southern California region. In 2008, the California State Legislature passed SB 375, which sets a framework and target dates to achieve Green House Gas reductions. This legislation impacts transportation planning, growth and development, housing, and land use decisions. It also expands the role of SCAG in setting regional targets.

In 2022, SCAG endorsed overturning two California State Legislature bills which would have required more housing in areas previously designated as being for single-famoily homes.

Under California Senate Bill 79 SCAG published a map designating where housing density would be allowed, in June 2026.

== See also ==
- Hal Bernson, Los Angeles City Council member, 1979–2003, former SCAG chairman
