= Yung See San Fong House =

Historic house in California, United States

- U.S. National Register of Historic Places
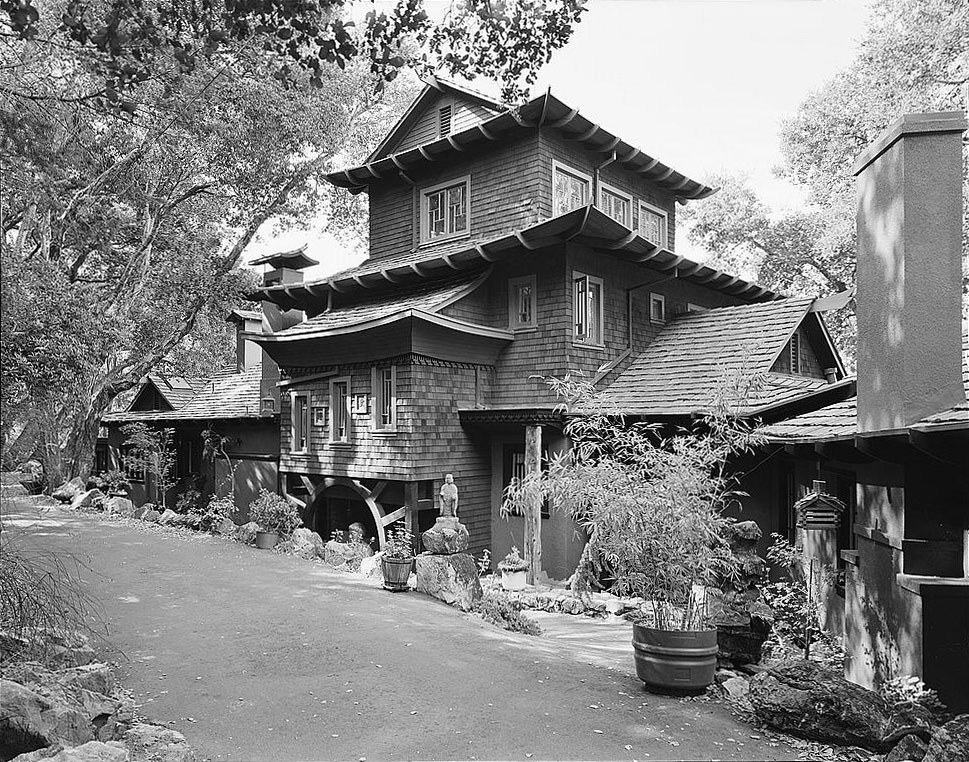
- Yung See San Fong House, 1980

- Location within San Francisco Bay Area Location within California Location within the United States
- Location: Los Gatos, California
- Coordinates: 37°12′56.65″N 121°57′32.37″W
- Built: 1917
- NRHP reference No.: 83001240
- Added to NRHP: September 8, 1983

The Yung See San Fong House, or "Young's Home in the Heart of the Hills", is a house in Los Gatos in the U.S. state of California. It is a combination of Asian decorative motifs and pagoda roofs together with Western massing and layout. It was completed in 1917 for Ruth Comfort Mitchell Young, a writer, and her husband, Sanborn Young, a gentleman farmer, conservationist and later California State Senator. The house is now a private residence.

== History ==
Ruth had spent summers in Los Gatos, where her parents and grandparents had summer homes. In 1916 the Youngs started building Yung See San Fong on property granted to them by her parents. Earlier that year, her play The Sweetmeat Game opened at the Palace Theatre on Broadway starring Olive Wyndham. With a Chinese setting the successful play toured the Orpheum circuit around the country for two years. The play provided her with the inspiration to combine the best of Chinese tastes and usage with her conception of beauty and comfort in the building and furnishing of her home, which she termed a "bungahigh" (as opposed to a bungalow).

Chinese traditions were adhered to as exemplified by the winding road, which was supposed to deter the devil from finding the house. A statue of the Chinese God of Rice and Plenty still greets visitors at the main gate.

Materials used in the house's construction include stucco, wooden shake shingles, and board and batten siding. The interior has hand-carved wooden panels with Chinese characters. The rooms were furnished with Chinoiserie hand-carved teak tables and chairs, prints, embroideries, and works of art. The dining room, which was screened in the summer and had glass windows in the winter, had woven sea grass seat furniture, which was stylish for the time.

Yung See San Fong was basically a self-sustaining farm where vegetables and poultry were raised. In an interview, Young stated, "We raise everything we eat but the staple groceries and the filet mignon." A Chinese man named Gin directed the household until the late 1920s. His activities included cooking the meals, planting the gardens, milking the cows, and assisting with the interior decoration.

As the Youngs were prominent politically and civically, many well-known people visited here, including President Herbert Hoover, who lived in nearby Palo Alto. Others included movie stars Joan and Constance Bennett, and Senator James D. Phelan, former Mayor of San Francisco.
