= Edna G. Riley =

American screenwriter (1880–1962)

- Born: Edna M. Goldsmith; April 29, 1880; Lower Lake, California, U.S.
- Died: May 3, 1962 (aged 82); New York, New York, U.S.
- Occupations: Screenwriter, playwright, author, assistant film director
- Spouse: Edward Patrick Riley

Edna G. Riley (also known as Edna Goldsmith Riley) (1880–1962) was an American screenwriter, author, activist, and assistant film director who worked in Hollywood primarily during the 1910s.

== Biography ==
Edna was born in Lower Lake, California, April 29, 1880, to William Goldsmith and Martha Asbill. As a young woman, she worked as a schoolteacher in her hometown. She later married playwright Edward Patrick Riley; the pair had no children together.

She wrote a string of scenarios for the fledgling motion pictures in the 1910s, and she continued writing into the 1930s. In 1935, she protested against censorship in motion pictures by picketing in front of a cardinal's home in Manhattan. Her script All Flags Flying had been purchased by Paramount, but the cardinal had objected to the film's content and gotten censors to bar it from production.

== Selected filmography ==
As writer:

- All Flags Flying (1935) (unproduced script)
- Before Morning (1933)
- The Crystal Gazer (1917)
- The Law of Compensation (1917)
- The Libertine (1916)
- The Prima Donna's Husband (1916)
- On the Brink of Shame (1916)

As assistant director:

- The Blindness of Love (1916)
