= California Climate Executive Orders =

The California Climate Change Executive Orders are a series of Executive Orders of the State of California signed by the Governor of California between 2004 and 2020 relating to efforts to reduce greenhouse gas emissions in California.

== Summary ==
California Climate Change Executive Orders
Date	Exec. Order	Summary	Ref.
April 20, 2004	S-07-04	Hydrogen Transportation: designates the 21 interstate freeways in California as the "California Hydrogen Highway Network" and directs state agencies to plan and build a network of hydrogen fueling stations along these routes by 2010	
December 14, 2004	S-20-04	Green Buildings: state agencies shall reduce energy use in state-owned buildings by 20% in 2015 and increase energy efficiency.	
June 1, 2005	S-03-05	Establishes targets for greenhouse gas emission reduction	
April 25, 2006	S-06-06	Establishes targets for biofuel production within California and biomass energy production	
October 18, 2006	S-20-06	Directs state departments to implement a cap-and-trade program	
January 18, 2007	S-01-07	Low Carbon Fuel Standard established	
November 14, 2008	S-13-08	Directs state agencies to complete analysis of the effects of sea level rise on California	
November 17, 2008	S-14-08	Establishes renewable energy generation share for retail sellers of electricity in California	
September 15, 2009	S-21-09	Renewable Energy: coordinates efforts between CARB, PUC, and ISO	
March 23, 2012	B-16-12	Directs state agencies to encourage the commercialization of zero emission vehicles, sets goal of 1 million ZEVs by 2020	
April 25, 2012	B-18-12	Efficiency standards for new and remodeled state-owned buildings	
April 29, 2015	B-30-15	Sets interim target of greenhouse gas emissions 40% less than 1990 levels by 2030	
July 17, 2015	B-32-15	Sets goals for ZEVs in freight transportation	
September 20, 2019	N-19-19	Requires various state agencies to leverage their existing investments, spending, or state-owned building to further CA's climate goals.	
September 23, 2020	N-79-20	Makes all California vehicles emissions free - cars and passenger trucks by 2035, medium and heavy duty trucks by 2045	

== Individual orders ==
=== S-03-05 ===
California Executive Order S-03-05 (June 2005, signed by Governor Arnold Schwarzenegger) sets greenhouse gas emissions reduction targets for the State of California and laid out responsibilities among the state agencies for implementing the Executive Order and for reporting on progress toward the targets.

Specifically, the Executive Order established these targets:

- By 2010, reduce GHG emissions to 2000 levels
- By 2020, reduce GHG emissions to 1990 levels
- By 2050, reduce GHG emissions to 80 percent below 1990 levels

The first and second goals were enshrined into law by the legislation known as AB 32, or the Global Warming Solutions Act of 2006, which gave the California Air Resources Board broad authority to implement a market-based system (also known as cap-and-trade) to achieve these goals.

=== B-30-15 ===
California Executive Order B-30-15 (April 2015, signed by Governor Jerry Brown) added the intermediate target of:

- By 2030, reduce GHG emissions to 40 percent below 1990 levels.

This intermediate target was codified into law by SB 32, which was signed into law by Governor Jerry Brown on September 8, 2016. On July 17, 2017, the legislature passed AB 398, which authorized the Air Resources Board to operate a cap and trade system to achieve these emissions reductions.

=== B-55-18 ===
California Executive Order B-55-18 (Sept 2018, signed by Governor Jerry Brown) took the further step of:

- By 2045, achieve statewide carbon neutrality.

=== N-79-20 ===
California Executive Order N-79-20 (September 2020, signed by Governor Gavin Newsom) established this executive order with the goal:

- For all new passenger cars and trucks to be zero-emission by 2035
- All medium- and heavy-duty vehicles to be zero-emission by 2045 for all operations where feasible
- All drayage trucks to be zero-emission by 2035
- All off-road vehicles and equipment to be zero-emission by 2035

The Executive Order requires the California Air Resources Board to promulgate regulations implementing these goals and for state agencies to accelerate the deployment of affordable fueling and charging options for zero-emissions vehicles, and to develop a Zero-Emissions Vehicle Market Development Strategy by January 31, 2021.
