= Global Warming Solutions Act of 2006 =

California state law

California State Legislature
- Full name: Global Warming Solutions Act of 2006
- Introduced: April 3, 2006
- Assembly voted: August 31, 2006
- Senate voted: August 30, 2006
- Signed into law: September 27, 2006
- Sponsor(s): Fran Pavley, Fabian Nunez
- Governor: Arnold Schwarzenegger
- Code: California Health and Safety Code
- Section: 38500, 38501, 28510, 38530, etc.
- Resolution: AB32 (2005-2006 Session)
- Associated bills: AB 398 (2017-2018 session; extends cap-and-trade until 2030), SB 32 (2015-2016 session; adds GHG reduction target of 40% below 1990 levels by 2030)
- Website: www.arb.ca.gov/cc/docs/ab32text.pdf

Status: Amended

The Global Warming Solutions Act of 2006, or Assembly Bill (AB) 32, is a California state law that fights global warming by establishing a comprehensive program to reduce greenhouse gas emissions from all sources throughout the state. AB32 was co-authored by Assemblymember Fran Pavley (D-Agoura Hills) and Speaker of the California Assembly Fabian Nunez (D-Los Angeles) and signed into law by Governor Arnold Schwarzenegger on September 27, 2006.

On June 1, 2005, Governor Schwarzenegger signed an executive order known as Executive Order S-3-05, which established greenhouse gas emissions targets for the state. The executive order required California to reduce greenhouse gas emissions to 2000 levels by 2010, to 1990 levels by 2020, and 80% below 1990 levels by 2050. However, to implement this measure, the California Air Resources Board (CARB) needed authority from the legislature. The California State Legislature passed the Global Warming Solutions Act to address this issue and gave the CARB authority to implement the program.

AB 32 requires the California Air Resources Board (CARB or ARB) to create regulations and market mechanisms to reduce the state's greenhouse gas emissions to 1990 levels by 2020, a 30% statewide reduction, with mandatory caps beginning in 2012 for significant emissions sources. The bill also allows the Governor to suspend the emissions caps for up to a year in case of emergency or significant economic harm.

California leads the U.S. in energy efficiency standards and environmental protection, but it is also the world's 12th largest carbon emitter. Greenhouse gas emissions are defined in the bill to include all the following: carbon dioxide, methane, nitrous oxide, sulfur hexafluoride, hydrofluorocarbons and perfluorocarbons. These are the same greenhouse gases listed in Annex A of the Kyoto Protocol.

== Background ==
The global community recognized the climate trends most recently at the 21st yearly session of the Conference of Parties (COP 21) in Paris, where a universal commitment to reduce average "global temperature rise this century well below 2 degrees Celsius and to drive efforts to limit the temperature increase even further to 1.5 degrees Celsius above pre-industrial levels".

Climate science dictates that global warming of more than 2 °C would have serious consequences, beyond those already being experienced, such as an increase in the number of extreme climate events. In order to avoid a global average surface temperature increase of 2 °C, global GHG emissions need to be reduced by 40–70% by 2050 and carbon neutrality (i.e. zero emissions) needs to be reached by the end of the century at the latest.

The United States pledged at the Paris COP 21, "to achieve an economy-wide target of reducing its greenhouse gas emissions by 26–28% below its 2005 level in 2025 and to make best efforts to reduce its emissions by 28%". Prior to the Paris agreements, which have not domestically been ratified by a two-thirds Senate vote, the US did not have any binding national GHG reduction targets.

== Requirements ==
AB 32 includes several specific requirements of the California Air Resources Board:

1. Prepare and approve a scoping plan to achieve the maximum feasible and cost-effective reductions in greenhouse gas sources or categories by 2020. The scoping plan, approved by the ARB Board December 12, 2008, provides the outline for actions to reduce greenhouse gases in California. The approved scoping plan indicates how these emission reductions will be achieved from significant greenhouse gas sources via regulations, market mechanisms and other actions.
2. Identify the statewide level of greenhouse gas emissions in 1990 to serve as the emissions limit to be achieved by 2020. In December 2007, the Board approved the 2020 emission limit of 427 million metric tons of carbon dioxide equivalent of greenhouse gases, however this limit was later revised to 431 million metric tons using updated methods that had been outlined in the IPCC Fourth Assessment Report.
3. Adopt a regulation requiring the mandatory reporting of greenhouse gas emissions. In December 2007, the Board adopted a regulation requiring the largest industrial sources to report and verify their greenhouse gas emissions. The reporting regulation serves as a solid foundation to determine greenhouse gas emissions and track future changes in emission levels. In 2011, the Board adopted the cap-and-trade regulation. The cap-and-trade program covers major sources of GHG emissions in the State such as refineries, power plants, industrial facilities, and transportation fuels. The cap-and-trade program includes an enforceable emissions cap that will decline over time. The State will distribute allowances, which are trad-able permits, equal to the emissions allowed under the cap. Sources under the cap will need to surrender allowances and offsets equal to their emissions at the end of each compliance period.
4. Identify and adopt regulations for discrete early actions that could be enforceable on or before January 1, 2010. The Board identified nine discrete early action measures including regulations affecting landfills, motor vehicle fuels, refrigerants in cars, tire pressure, port operations and other sources in 2007 that included ship electrification at ports and reduction of high GWP gases in consumer products.
5. Ensure early voluntary reductions receive appropriate credit in the implementation of AB 32
6. Convene an Environmental Justice Advisory Committee (EJAC) to advise the Board in developing the Scoping Plan and any other pertinent matter in implementing AB 32. The EJAC has met 12 times since early 2007, providing comments on the proposed early action measures and the development of the scoping plan, and submitted its comments and recommendations on the scoping plan in October 2008. ARB will continue to work with the EJAC as AB 32 is implemented.
7. Appoint an Economic and Technology Advancement Advisory Committee (ETAAC) to provide recommendations for technologies, research and greenhouse gas emission reduction measures. After a year-long public process, the ETAAC submitted a report of their recommendations to the Board in February 2008. The ETAAC also reviewed and provided comments on the scoping plan.

== Timeline ==
AB 32 stipulates the following timeline:

By Jan 1, 2009	ARB adopts plan indicating how emission reductions will be achieved from significant sources of GHGs via regulations, market mechanisms and other actions
During 2009	ARB staff drafts rule language to implement its plan and holds a series of public workshop on each measure (including market mechanisms)
By Jan 1, 2010	Early action measures take effect
During 2010	ARB conducts series of rulemakings, after workshops and public hearings, to adopt GHG regulations including rules governing market mechanisms
By Jan 1, 2011	ARB completes major rulemakings for reducing GHGs including market mechanisms. ARB may revise the rules and adopt new ones after 1/1/2011 in furtherance of the 2020 cap
By Jan 1, 2012	GHG rules and market mechanisms adopted by ARB take effect and are legally enforceable
2013/2014 Schedule	ARB plans to update the AB 32 Scoping Plan. The AB 32 Scoping Plan update will identify specific actions needed to reach the 2020 goal as well as lay the foundation to reach post- 2020 goals.
December 31, 2020	Deadline for achieving 2020 GHG emissions cap.

In late-January 2014, ARB plans to release the draft proposed Scoping Plan Update and Environmental Assessment. In February 2014, ARB will have a Board meeting discussion that will include additional opportunities for stakeholder feedback and public comment. In Spring 2014, ARB will hold a Board Hearing to consider the Final Scoping Plan Update and Environmental Assessment.

As of August 2016, AB 32 continues to be built upon. On September 9, Governor Jerry Brown strengthened the commitment to AB 32 by signing SB 32 by Sen. Fran Pavley (D-Agoura Hills) and AB 197 by Assembly member Eduardo Garcia (D-Coachella). This legally enshrined the goal outlined by Executive Order B-30-15, to reduce the state's greenhouse gas emissions 40% below 1990 levels by 2030. On July 17, 2017, both houses of the California State Legislature pass AB 398 with a two-thirds majority vote, which authorizes the California Air Resources Board to operate a cap-and-trade system to achieve these reductions.

== Achievements ==
December 2007	ARB approves a limit of 427 million metric tons of carbon dioxide equivalent (MMTCO2E) of greenhouse gas emissions in 2020
December 2007	ARB adopts a regulation requiring the largest industrial sources to report and verify their greenhouse gas emissions.
February 2008	ARB approves a policy statement encouraging voluntary early actions for emissions reductions and establishing a procedure for project proponents to submit quantification methods to be evaluated by ARB.
December 12, 2008	Scoping plan approved and adopted by ARB, providing an outline of actions to reduce greenhouse gas emissions from significant sources in California via regulations, market mechanisms and other actions.
January 2009	ARB adopts plan indicating how emission reductions will be achieved from significant sources of GHGs via regulations, market mechanisms and other actions.
During 2009	ARB staff drafts rule language to implement its plan and holds a series of public workshop on each measure (including market mechanisms).
January 1, 2010	Early Action measures take effect.
During 2010	ARB conducts series of rulemakings, after workshops and public hearings, to adopt GHG regulations including rules governing market mechanisms.
January 1, 2011	ARB completes major rulemakings for reducing Greenhouse Gases, including market mechanisms.
January 1, 2012	Greenhouse Gas rules and market mechanisms adopted by ARB take effect and are legally enforceable.
October 2013	CARB and the Quebec Ministry of Sustainable Development, Environment, Wildlife, and Parks officially linked their greenhouse gas cap-and-trade programs. As a result, greenhouse gas emission allowances from California and Quebec will be interchangeable for compliance purposes starting on January 1, 2014. California and Quebec's link represents the first multi-sector cap-and-trade program linkage in North America.

To date, ARB has identified nine discrete early action measures to reduce greenhouse gas emissions, including regulations affecting landfills, motor vehicle fuels, refrigerants in cars, tire pressure, port operations and other sources. Regulatory development for additional measures is ongoing.

The Environmental Justice Advisory Committee (EJAC) has met 12 times since early 2007 and submitted comments and recommendations on the scoping plan in October 2008. The Economic and Technology Advancement Advisory Committee (ETAAC) submitted a report of their recommendations to the Board in February 2008. The ETAAC also reviewed and provided comments on the scoping plan.

In June 2013, ARB held a kickoff public workshop in Sacramento to discuss the development of the Scoping Plan Update, public process, and overall schedule. In July 2013, subsequent regional workshops were held in Diamond Bar; Fresno; and the Bay Area, which provided forums to discuss region-specific issues, concerns, and priorities.

== Strategies ==
1. Cap-and-Trade Program: Firm limit on total greenhouse gas emissions. Covers 85% of all emissions statewide; includes participation in the Western Climate Initiative
2. Electricity and Energy: Improved appliance efficiency standards and other energy efficiency measures; goal is for 33% of energy to come from renewable sources by 2020;
3. High Global Warming Potential Gases: reduce emissions and use of refrigerants and certain other gases that have much higher impact, per molecule than carbon dioxide
4. Agriculture: more efficient agricultural equipment, fuel use and water use
5. Transportation: adherence to "Pavley Standards" to achieve reductions in greenhouse gas emissions from motor vehicles
6. Industry: audit and regulate emissions from 800 largest industrial sources statewide, including the cement industry
7. Forestry: preserve forest sequestration and other voluntary programs
8. Waste and Recycling: reduce methane emissions from landfills; reduce waste and increase recycling/reuse

== AB 32 Scoping Plan ==
Assembly Bill 32 (AB 32) required the California Air Resources Board (ARB or Board) to develop a Scoping Plan that describes the approach California will take to reduce greenhouse gases (GHG) to achieve the goal of reducing emissions to 1990 levels by 2020. The Scoping Plan was first considered by the Board in 2008 and must be updated every five years. ARB is currently in the process of updating the Scoping Plan. Details regarding this update are outlined below.

AB 32 Scoping Plan Update

The Scoping Plan Update (Update) builds upon the initial Scoping Plan with new strategies and recommendations. The Update identifies opportunities to leverage existing and new funds to further drive GHG emission reductions through strategic planning and targeted low carbon investments. The Update defines ARB's climate change priorities for the next five years and sets the groundwork to reach California's post-2020 climate goals set forth in Executive Orders S-3-05 and B-16-2012. The Update will highlight California's progress toward meeting the near-term 2020 GHG emission reduction goals defined in the initial Scoping Plan. It will also evaluate how to align the State's longer-term GHG reduction strategies with other State policy priorities for water, waste, natural resources, clean energy, transportation, and land use.

What are the key focus areas for the Update?

ARB plans to focus on six key topics areas for the post-2020 element. These include: (1) transportation, fuels, and infrastructure, (2) energy generation, transmission, and efficiency, (3) waste, (4) water, (5) agriculture, and (6) natural and working lands.

What recent activity has occurred in 2013?

In June 2013, ARB held a kickoff public workshop in Sacramento to discuss the development of the Scoping Plan Update, public process, and overall schedule. In July 2013, subsequent regional workshops were held in Diamond Bar; Fresno; and the Bay Area, which provided forums to discuss region-specific issues, concerns, and priorities. In addition, ARB accepted and considered informal stakeholder comments from June 13, 2013, through August 5, 2013. ARB also reconvened the Environmental Justice Advisory Committee to advise, and provide recommendations on the development of, this Update. On October 1, 2013, ARB released a discussion draft of the Update to the AB 32 Scoping Plan for public review and comment. On October 15, 2013, ARB held a public workshop and provided an update to the Board at the October 24, 2013 Board Hearing. Extensive public comment and input was received at the October Board Hearing. In addition, over 115 comment letters were submitted on the discussion draft.

What activities are planned for 2014?

In late-January 2014, ARB plans to release the draft proposed Scoping Plan Update and Environmental Assessment. In February 2014, ARB will have a Board meeting discussion that will include additional opportunities for stakeholder feedback and public comment. In Spring 2014, ARB will hold a Board Hearing to consider the Final Scoping Plan Update and Environmental Assessment.

What is the status of AB 32 implementation?

The California Global Warming Solutions Act of 2006 (AB 32) has been implemented effectively with a suite of complementary strategies that serve as a model going forward. California is on target for meeting the 2020 GHG emission reduction goal. Many of the GHG reduction measures (e.g., Low Carbon Fuel Standard, Advanced Clean Car standards, and Cap-and-Trade) have been adopted over the last five years and implementation activities are ongoing. California is getting real reductions to put us on track for reducing GHG emissions to achieve the AB 32 goal of getting back to 1990 levels by 2020.

== Cap-and-Trade ==
On December 17, 2010, ARB adopted a cap-and-trade program to place an upper limit on state-wide greenhouse gas emissions. This is the first program of its kind on this scale in the United States, though in the north-eastern United States, the Regional Greenhouse Gas Initiative (RGGI) works on a similar principle. Through the Western Climate Initiative (WCI), California is working to link its cap and trade system to other states. In October 2013, California officially linked its cap-and-trade program with Quebec Ministry of Sustainable Development, Environment, Wildlife, and Parks. The program had a soft start in 2012, with the first required compliance period starting in 2013. Emissions are to be reduced by two percent each year through 2015 and three percent each year from 2015 to 2020. The rules apply first to utilities and large industrial plants, and in 2015 will begin to be applied to fuel distributors as well, eventually totaling 360 businesses at 600 locations throughout the State of California. Free credits will be distributed to businesses to account for about 90 percent of overall emissions in their sector, but they must buy allowances (credits) at auction, to account for additional emissions. The auction format used will be single round, sealed bid auction. A preliminary auction was held August 30, 2012 with the first actual quarterly auction to take place November 14, 2012.

=== CARB Quarterly Auction Results ===
These auctions demonstrate the following trends: (1) after an initial spike in qualified bidder number, the number of qualified bidders began to decrease; (2) the percentage of 2015 and 2016 allowances sold increased continually to reach 100%; (3) the percentage of current year allowances sold remained constant at 100%; (4) although the settlement prices for current year allowances initially increased, they then began to decrease; (5) the settlement prices for the 2015 or 2016 allowances have increased.

Some of the most well-known bidders were California Department of Water Resources, Campbell Soup Supply Company, Chevron U.S.A. Inc., Citigroup Energy Inc., Exxon Mobil Corporation, J.P. Morgan Ventures Energy Corporation, Noble Americas Gas & Power Corp., Pacific Gas and Electric Company, Phillips 66 Company, Shell Energy North America, Silicon Valley Power, Southern California Edison Company, The Bank of Nova Scotia, Union Pacific Railroad Company, and Vista Metals Corp. A qualified bidder is an entity that registered for the auction, submitted an acceptable bid guarantee, and received acceptance from the ARB to participate in the auction.

CARB Quarterly Auction Results
Auction no.	Quarter	Year of Allowances	No. of Allowances	Median Allowance Price (USD)	% of available allowances bought
1	November 2012	2013	23,126,110	11.81	97
1	November 2012	2015	5,576,000	10.75	91
2	February 2013	2013	12,924,822	12.91	88.15
2	February 2013	2016	4,440,000	11.10	100
3	May 2013	2013	14,522,048	14.25	90.22
3	May 2013	2016	7,515,000	11.02	86.49
4	August 2013	2013	13,865,422	13.01	95.5
4	August 2013	2016	9,560,000	11.10	96.3
5	November 2014	2013	16,614,526	11.55	96.2
5	November 2014	2016	9,560,000	11.15	91.3

== Offsets ==
In addition to emission allowances, CCAs. Compliance entities may also use a certain percentage of offset credits in the system. Offsets credits are generated by projects that reduce emissions or act as sinks for green house gasses. Currently the Air Resources Board allows for different types of offset projects to generate offset credits: U.S. Forest and Urban Forest Project Resources, Livestock Projects (methane emission control), Ozone Depleting Substances Projects, and Urban Forest Projects.

Offset provisions in the cap and trade scheme are however controversial and have been challenged in court. In March 2012, Citizens Climate Lobby and Our Children's Earth Foundation, two California environmental groups, sued the California Air Resources Board for the inclusion of its offset provisions. Their request was denied and when the Our Children's Earth Foundation appealed the decision was affirmed.

== Economic impacts ==
According to ARB, AB 32 is "generating jobs, promoting a growing, clean-energy economy and a healthy environment for California at the same time."

- AB 32 supports efficiency-driven job growth
- California gets more clean energy venture capital investment than all states combined
- Green technologies produce new jobs faster
- Venture capital investment produces thousands of new jobs
- Green jobs are growing faster than any other industry
- California leads the nation in clean technology
- California's economic powerhouses support AB 32
- AB 32 requires California to lower greenhouse gas emissions to 1990 levels by 2020.
- Climate change will have a significant impact on the sustainability of water supplies in the coming decades.

== Political challenges ==
The bill was challenged by Proposition 23 on the November 2010 ballot, which aimed to suspend AB 32 until state unemployment stayed below 5.5% for four consecutive quarters. The proposition was defeated by a wide margin.

== Legal challenges ==
Two lawsuits have been filed challenging the legality of ARB's auctions of GHG emission permits. The petitioners contend that the auctions are not authorized under AB 32, and that the revenues generated by the auctions violate California's Proposition 13 or Proposition 26. A hearing was conducted on both challenges on August 28, 2013, in Sacramento County Superior Court.

AB 26 was initiated by Assembly woman Susan Bonilla, District of Concord and it was heard in the Senate Environmental Quality Committee June 19, 2013. The bill is sponsored by the State Building and Construction trades Council, AFL-CIO, and supported by California Teamsters Public Affairs Council and the International Association of Heat and Frost Insulators Local 5. Briefly, the bill is about the labor unions who wants portion from cap and trade's revenue to increasing wages for their workers, getting more jobs and increasing the number of union members that work in the industry that actually produce greenhouse gas emission. In this case, union labor will be fighting environmental groups supportive of AB 32 goals. The bill passed, 7–0.

On Nov 12, 2013 The California Chamber of Commerce launched the first industry lawsuit against the auction portion of California's cap-and-trade program on the basis that auctioning off allowances constitutes an unauthorized, unconstitutional tax. The complaint was filed for Sacramento Superior Court and seeks to stop the auction and have the auction regulations declared invalid. However, California superior court has rejected the challenges to the state's cap-and-trade program, upholding a significant element of California's suite of programs to comply with AB 32 and to reduce the state's greenhouse gas emissions. -

== Senate Bill 32 ==
The California Global Warming Solutions Act of 2006: emissions limit, or SB-32, is a California Senate bill expanding upon AB-32 to reduce greenhouse gas (GHG) emissions. The lead author is Senator Fran Pavley and the principal co-author is Assemblymember Eduardo Garcia. SB-32 was signed into law on September 8, 2016, by Governor Jerry Brown. SB-32 sets into law the mandated reduction target in GHG emissions as written into Executive Order B-30-15.

The Senate bill requires that there be a reduction in GHG emissions to 40% below the 1990 levels by 2030. Greenhouse gas emissions include carbon dioxide, methane, nitrous oxide, sulfur hexafluoride, hydrofluorocarbons, and perfluorocarbons. The California Air Resources Board (CARB) is responsible for ensuring that California meets this goal. The provisions of SB-32 were added to Section 38566 of the Health and Safety Code subsequent to the bill's approval. The bill goes into effect January 1, 2017. SB-32 builds onto Assembly Bill (AB) 32 written by Senator Fran Pavley and Assembly Speaker Fabian Nunez passed into law on September 27, 2006. AB-32 required California to reduce greenhouse gas emissions to 1990 levels by 2020 and SB-32 continues that timeline to reach the targets set in Executive Order B-30-15. SB-32 provides another intermediate target between the 2020 and 2050 targets set in Executive Order S-3-05.

SB-32 was contingent on the passing of AB-197, which increases legislative oversight of CARB and is intended to ensure CARB must report to the Legislature. AB-197 also passed and was signed into law on September 8, 2016.

California has set reduction targets based on 1990 levels of GHG emissions. The 1990 emissions limit was initially set at 427 million metric tons of carbon dioxide equivalent (MMTCO_{2}e), but was revised in 2014 to 431 MMTCO_{2}e based on updated scientific reporting. In 2014, California emitted a total of 441.5 MMTCO_{2}e, a reduction of over 1.5 million MMTCO2e since 2012. It is believed that California will continue to reduce GHG emissions and meet the 2020 target. The 2030 reduction goal of 40% below 1990 levels equates to a target emissions rate of 258.6 MMTCO_{2}e by 2030. The long-term emission reduction goal set forth in EO S-3-05 to reach 80% below 1990 levels by 2050 equates to a target emissions rate of 86.2 MMTCO_{2}e by 2050.

=== Related regulations ===
==== Assembly Bill (AB) 197 ====
AB-197 was signed into legislation by Governor Brown on the same day as SB-32, September 8, 2016. AB-197 is directly related to SB-32 in that AB-197 contains language stating AB-197 is only operative if SB-32 is enacted and becomes law on or before January 1, 2017.

The provisions of AB-197 are intended to provide more legislative oversight of CARB by adding two new legislatively appointed non-voting members to the CARB Board, increasing the Legislature's role in the ARB Board's decisions. Additionally, AB-197 limits the term length of CARB Board members to six years. AB-197 also requires that CARB "protect the state's most impacted and disadvantaged communities … [and] consider the social costs of the emissions of greenhouse gases" in preparing plans to meet GHG reduction goals.

==== Executive Order B-30-15 ====
Executive Order (EO) B-30-15 was signed by Governor Brown in April 2015 that set an executive greenhouse gas emissions target for 2030 at 40% below 1990 levels.

==== Executive Order S-3-05 ====
EO S-3-05 was signed by Governor Arnold Schwarzenegger in June 2005 that set an executive greenhouse gas emissions target for 2050 at 80% below 1990 levels. While state legislation has not yet been passed regarding a 2050 statewide emissions target, this Executive Orders holds some weight. See Executive Order for more details.

=== Senate bill requirements ===
SB-32 requires CARB to reduce greenhouse gas emissions to 40% below the 1990 levels by 2030. This bill gives CARB the authority to adopt regulations in order to achieve the maximum technology feasible to be the most cost-efficient way to reduce greenhouse gas emissions. They are also required to meet these goals in such a way that benefits the state's most disadvantaged communities as they are "disproportionately impacted" by the effects of climate change, such as drought and flooding.

SB-32 does not state how California will or should reach emission reduction targets, but rather leaves it up to CARB to adopt rules and regulations "in an open public process" to "achieve the maximum, technologically feasible, and cost-effective greenhouse gas emissions reductions". Under AB-32, CARB is required to publish an Update to the Scoping Plan every five years, detailing how CARB plans to meet emission reduction targets. The Second Update to the Scoping Plan is currently being prepared, and will be published in 2017. The Second Update to the Scoping Plan is required to incorporate 2030 target year goals.

== Environmental Justice ==
Critics of the cap-and-trade system have shown concern about the distribution of pollution reduction efforts, and the affect this has had on low-income populations since its 2012 introduction. This market-based approach decreased total emissions, but concentrated emissions persisted in disadvantaged communities (DAC's) where air pollution is more prominent. GHG emissions in Californian rural and disadvantaged areas primarily come from mobile and area-wide pollution from fossil fuel burning via transportation, with 92% of PM2.5 particulate matter, and 94% of PM10 particulate matter coming from area-wide, mobile and natural sources, more than some stationary sources which the policy targets. Air pollution arising from sources such as transportation, continues to accumulate in these disadvantaged areas, but are regulated outside of cap-and-trade, with policy plans that critics have identified as costly and challenging, while transportation remains the largest source of California's GHG emissions. The cap-and-trade approach to GHG reduction and regulation targets pollution sources that fit the designated model, but other sources of pollution are unaffected by this programming and allowed to persist.

The market-based structure of cap-and-trade allows businesses to buy into the option to increase emissions, since leftover pollutant credits from one company can be sold to another. Even with AB 32 in place, certain communities have worsened in terms of air pollution, and this can be attributed to the 'trade' aspect of the cap-and-trade system, where industrial companies who buy more credits produce more emissions. In places where emissions have worsened, there exists higher populations of low-income individuals, with higher relative Cal/OSHA CalEnviroScreen (CES) scores. As an effort to remediate the imbalance in terms of environmental justice, the California government adjacently proposed a 2012 bill (SB 535) that enforced 25% of the cap-and-trade funds to be redirected to DAC's, with 10% of proceeds going towards affordable housing efforts, and other projects benefitting DAC's and their residents. SB 535 seeks to mitigate some of the environmental justice concerns of cap-and-trade programs, allowing funding back into improving facilities in California's low-income areas and DAC's.

Environmental justice is an important aspect of SB-32. SB-32 emphasizes the need for protecting the state's most disadvantaged communities. The concerns brought up in the bill are that those communities are affected first and most often by the negative impacts of climate change, such as drought, heat, and flooding. SB-32 also emphasizes that disadvantaged communities are also disproportionately affected health-wise. While SB-32 does not specifically lay out a plan on how to address environmental justice issues that the authors wrote into the bill, the companion bill AB-197 does. AB-197 requires a committee to be formed and called the Joint Legislative Committee on Climate Change Policies (JLCCCP), which will be responsible, among other duties, for addressing and prioritizing the disadvantaged communities in California.

== Fate of Cap-and-Trade under SB-32 and AB-197 ==
The California Cap-and-Trade program was created by CARB as a market mechanism to reach GHG emission reduction targets established in AB-32. There currently is a Cap-and-Trade program in California, though it is not directly required under SB-32, which simply establishes a clear emissions reduction goal. In preparation of the Second Update to the Scoping Plan, CARB was presented with a study out of the University of Southern California and the University of California at Berkeley that found a tight correlation between the locations of polluting industries and of low-income communities. The environmental justice concerns associated with the cap-and-trade program could urge CARB to consider alternatives to the cap-and-trade market mechanism in the upcoming Scoping Plan.

Additionally, as part of AB-197, reports of emissions inventories for GHGs, criteria pollutants, and toxic air contaminants are required to be made public and updated at least once a year.

== Criticisms ==
Critics of SB-32 note that CARB has too much un-checked power in regulating California, and that the legislative branch should have more involvement. However, the passage of AB-197 assuaged many of these critics. Other critics of SB-32 argue that the cap-and-trade program is actually a tax, levied without a two-thirds vote of the Legislature. See Global Warming Solutions Act of 2006 for a discussion of the current legal challenges facing the cap-and-trade program. Still, further critics assert that the benefits of the CARB-favored cap-and-trade program are not shared equally by all Californians. One preliminary report asserts that polluters who can afford to are continuing to pollute, buying their way out of making actual reductions. And those polluters tend to be located in or near low-income communities that are frequently also communities of color, where their continued emissions of particulate matter and the like are degrading residents’ health.

== See also ==
- Climate Change
- Kyoto Protocol
- Regulation of greenhouse gases under the Clean Air Act
- Sustainable Communities and Climate Protection Act of 2008
- Climate change in California
