= Sustainable Communities and Climate Protection Act of 2008 =

California law

California State Legislature
- Full name: Sustainable Communities and Climate Protection Act of 2008 (SB 375)
- Signed into law: September 30, 2008
- Sponsor: Darrell Steinberg
- Governor: Arnold Schwarzenegger
- Code: Health and Safety Code
- Section: 65080, 65400, 65583, 65584, 65587, 65588, 14522, 21061, and 21159
- Resolution: SB 375
- Website: http://www.leginfo.ca.gov/pub/07-08/bill/sen/sb_0351-0400/sb_375_bill_20080930_chaptered.pdf

Status: Current legislation

The Sustainable Communities and Climate Protection Act of 2008, also known as Senate Bill 375 or SB 375, is a State of California law targeting greenhouse gas emissions from passenger vehicles. The Global Warming Solutions Act of 2006 (AB 32) sets goals for the reduction of statewide greenhouse gas emissions. Passenger vehicles are the single largest source of greenhouse gas emissions statewide, accounting for 30% of total emissions. SB 375 therefore provides key support to achieve the goals of AB 32.

SB 375 instructs the California Air Resources Board (CARB) to set regional emissions' reduction targets from passenger vehicles. The Metropolitan Planning Organization for each region must then develop a "Sustainable Communities Strategy" (SCS) that integrates transportation, land-use and housing policies to plan for achievement of the emissions target for their region.

In a press release the day he signed the bill into law, Governor Arnold Schwarzenegger stated, "What this will mean is more environmentally-friendly communities, more sustainable developments, less time people spend in their cars, more alternative transportation options and neighborhoods we can safely and proudly pass on to future generations."

== Background ==
Senate Bill 375 was introduced as a bill in order to meet the environmental standards set out by the Global Warming Solutions Act of 2006 (AB 32). Since its implementation in 2006, AB 32 has facilitated the passage of a cap-and-trade program in 2010 which placed an upper limit on greenhouse gas levels emitted by the state of California. AB 32 has contributed to its initial objectives of curbing climate change by establishing a program to reduce greenhouse gas emissions from various sources throughout California. AB 32 mandates that California reaches 1990 levels of greenhouse gas emissions by 2020, which is a twenty five percent decrease from the current levels in the state. Firstly, AB 32 purports to ratify a scoping plan to reach the most practicable reductions in greenhouse gas emissions from different sources. This scoping plan outlines how actions will be taken to reduce these emissions and how particular regulations and strategies or plans can contribute to this goal. Also, AB 32 identifies the levels of emissions, sets feasible limits, and adopts a regulatory measure to necessitate the mandatory reporting of these emission measures. The main components within the AB 32 policy have been to institute the cap-and-trade project, increase fuel efficiency in vehicles, decrease the carbon content in fuel, and motivate communities to become energy efficient. In order to fulfill these objectives, SB 375 aims to reduce the amount of carbon emitted by vehicles, reduce the amount of carbon in fuel, and reduce the distance in vehicle trips. SB 375 serves as the nation's first ever law to associate global warming with land use planning and transportation. SB 375 addresses these issues by tracking the levels of emissions from vehicles and by modifying the planning allocations of regional housing and transportation in order to create transportation and land use patterns such that the public will drive their vehicles less. Metropolitan Planning Organizations (MPOs) within California are now concerned with carrying out these roles in order to amend these patterns and incentivize the restructuring of plans that contribute in reducing greenhouse gas emissions.

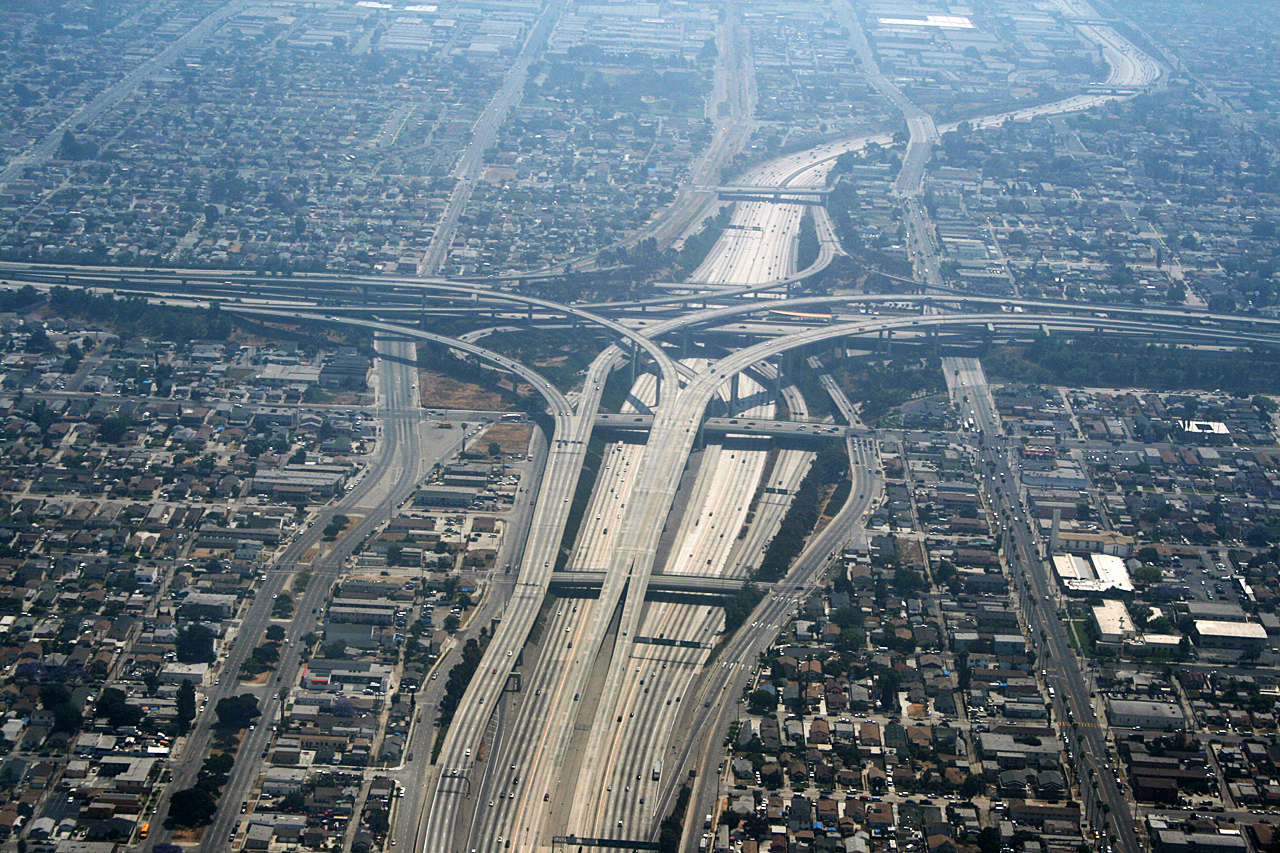
SB 375 attempts to reduce greenhouse gas emissions, particularly from vehicles, throughout the state of California.

SB 375 went into effect on January 1, 2009 and endured twelve amendments from various groups which modified its initially more stringent mandates. SB 375 takes travel time into account by acknowledging that the development of transportation and land systems affects the amount of time that the public spends driving. The bill's objective is to lead each of California's regions to adopt more long-term sustainable investments across multiple sectors by lessening the extent to which Californians spend time driving and reducing air pollution through these efforts. These sustainable investments are meant to decrease driving distances in order to make driving less necessary. Multiple regional planning commissions, local governmental bodies, and state environmental groups are responsible for SB 375's implementation.

== Provisions for implementation ==
Under the bill, each of California's 18 regions are required to generate a land use and transportation plan, which serves as the SCS for each region. The bill necessitates that every MPO must have a 'Sustainable Communities Strategy' included in the regional transportation plan to show how these targets will be met. As a means of integrating transportation, housing, and land-use plans, this SCS will assist Metropolitan Planning Organizations (MPO)'s in meeting the greenhouse gas emission targets for 2020 and 2035 which are assigned by the California Air Resources Board (CARB). Each SCS adopted in California includes land use strategies and transportation investment plans to carry out reductions in greenhouse gas emissions. All the SCS plans developed are generated in accordance with the Regional Transportation Plan (RTP) which regulates transportation financing in each region, as well as with a Regional Housing Needs Allocation (RHNA) which establishes housing goals and housing allocations consistent with the SCS such that the housing and zoning of municipalities must accommodate the plans set out by the RHNA. CARB assigns emissions targets for each region in California which is responsible for ensuring that these targets are met by 2020 and 2035 and then verifies that each SCS will sufficiently fulfill its aims and meet the emissions targets. The SCS guides local governments, with regard to plans regarding zoning or transportation and also provides incentives to developers who develop projects that help to meet the emission targets. Each SCS includes maps which show the land uses in the region, a plan that considers the housing needs of everyone of all income levels living in the region as well as an analysis of impacts on open spaces.

SB 375 establishes a coordinative process between metropolitan planning organizations (MPOs) and the Air Resources Board (ARB) such that greenhouse gas emission targets are created for every region within California. Also, the bill makes it necessary for governmental decisions that are associated with transportation funding to be in line with the SCS. SB 375 establishes 'California Environmental Quality Act' (CEQA), a statute that mandates state and local agencies to ascertain the environmental effects of their actions and to mitigate them if possible, which serves to streamline benefits for projects that are consistent with this strategy. SB 375 provides CEQA incentives and exceptions for particular development projects that parallel the SCS that the bill sets out. The bill proposes changes to housing law in order to develop common land usage expectations for regional transportation planning and housing. Lastly, the bill fortifies requisites for public input to the creation and review of MPO plans. As a strategy to reach the goals of AB 32, SB 375 requires that CARB establish the targets for reductions in greenhouse gas emission targets for the eighteen MPOs in the state for 2020 and 2035. CARB assigned the 'Regional Targets Advisory Committee' to identify mechanisms for these reductions. After the targets are set, MPOs are required to update their Regional Transportation Plans (RTPs) such that the integrative patterns of planning across multiple sectors are in accordance with one another. If a MPO is practicably unable to meet the greenhouse gas emission reduction target set forth by the SCS, the MPO is required to prepare an 'Alternative Planning Strategy' to identify the impediments to reaching these targets and to demonstrate how emission reductions will take place through the adoption of alternative planning and development patterns.

=== Obstacles ===
One significant obstacle that SB 375 has faced relates to the lack of a permanent funding source. When the bill was enacted into law, there was no identified source of funding to finance the comprehensive set of tasks set out for regional agencies. The Southern California Association of Governments initially approximated that the bill's implementation would require $8 million. However, this estimate did not include the costs of local agencies in planning actions related to the bill. As of now, the only possible source of additional funding is $90 million derived from funds of Proposition 84 but these funds are assigned to be utilized for the development and design of sustainable communities in general. Because SB 375 requires constant and continual funding, this funding is unlikely to be enough in financing the long-term objectives of the bill. Although SB 406 was introduced by Senator Mark DeSaulinier to provide permanent financing for SB 375, this bill would require a subcharge on motor vehicle registration and this additional cost is one possible reason why the bill was not amended. In 2009, Governor Schwarzenegger vetoed SB 406 and cited the imposition of this fee as subject to the approval of California voters. As of now, SB 406 has not been passed. Additionally, increased financial incentives are likely to be needed in order to support infill developers since increased tax incentives, and reduced permit fees may increase infill development. AB 782 was also introduced by California State Assembly member Kevin Jeffries as a bill to apply CEQA exemptions to more kinds of development projects. This would alter the current patterns of infill development. Although AB 782 was not passed, it represents another bill that was introduced to amend the effects caused by SB 375. In addition, there has been a significant degree of skepticism associated with SB 375's effectiveness. This skepticism derives from the fact that the bill only mandates that a plan for emissions reductions to be created with no requirement for the implementation of this plan. Also, regional governmental bodies are responsible for developing these plans and these bodies do not have the power to regulate the usage of land. However, the law sets a precursor for the creation of a regional carbon budget and puts into place the processes to reduce greenhouse gas emissions

== Regional Targets ==
On September 23, 2011, ARB adopted greenhouse gas emission targets from passenger vehicles for each of the state's eighteen MPOs for the years 2020 and 2035. These targets were developed in coordination with each of the MPOs. Targets for the eight San Joaquin Valley MPOs are placeholder targets pending the development of improved data, modeling, and target setting scenarios. Targets for the remaining six Metropolitan Planning Organizations—the Monterey Bay, Butte, San Luis Obispo, Santa Barbara, Shasta and Tahoe Basin regions—generally match or improve upon their current plans for 2020 and 2035. MTC, SANDAG, SACOG, SCAG and the San Joaquin Valley MPOs comprise 95% of the State of California's current population, vehicle miles of travel, and passenger vehicle greenhouse gas emissions, with the remaining six MPOs comprising only 5%. The targets are expressed as a percent reduction in per capita greenhouse gas emissions, with 2005 as a base year. Regions that meet their targets may receive easier access to certain federal funding opportunities and streamlined environment review of development and infrastructure projects. Final targets were adopted by ARB on February 15, 2011.

=== Regional Targets - Percent Reduction in Per Capita Greenhouse Gas Emissions from Passenger Vehicles ===
MPO	2020	2035
San Francisco Bay Area Metropolitan Transportation Commission (MTC)	7%	15%
San Diego Association of Governments (SANDAG)	7%	13%
Sacramento Area Council of Governments (SACOG)	7%	16%
San Joaquin Valley MPOs (8 in total)	5%	10%
Southern California Association of Governments (SCAG)	8%	13%
6 other MPOs		
Tahoe	7%	5%
Shasta	0%	0%
Butte	1%	1%
San Luis Obispo	8%	8%
Santa Barbara	0%	0%
Monterey Bay	0%	5%

== Sustainable Communities Strategies ==
Every four years in areas that are not in attainment under the Clean Air Act, and every five years in areas of attainment, MPOs prepare a Regional Transportation Plan that serves as a blueprint for future investments in transportation in their region. SB 375 adds each a new element to the RTP, called a Sustainable Communities Strategy, or SCS. The SCS will increase the integration of land use and transportation planning through more detailed allocation of land uses in the RTP. Local and regional governments and agencies are empowered to determine how the targets are met, through a combination of land use planning, transportation programs, projects and policies, and/or other strategies. ARB will review each SCS to determine whether it would, if implemented, achieve the greenhouse gas emission reduction target for its region. If the SCS will not meet the region's target, the MPO must prepare a separate "alternative planning strategy (APS)" that is expected to meet the target. The APS is not a part of the RTP.

== SCS Evaluation Methodology ==
In July 2011, ARB published a description of the methodology that it will use to determine whether a region's SCS, if adopted, will be expected to meet the greenhouse gas reduction target for that region.

MPOs develop models to estimate current and predict future transportation-related conditions in the region. Inputs to the model include population distribution, land uses, and transportation infrastructure and services. The model then converts these inputs into output values such as vehicle miles traveled, daily trips per household and percentage trips by various modes of travel (auto, transit, bicycling and walking). These and other outputs of the model will be used to estimate total greenhouse gas emissions from motor vehicles for the region.

Primary responsibility for transportation modeling remains with the MPOs, as will the evaluation of the impact of their SCS on greenhouse gas emissions. ARB's role will be evaluate the technical analysis performed by the MPOs, including a review of model complexity, and consideration of available resources and unique characteristics of each region. ARB will confirm estimates of vehicle-related GHG emissions and make a determination of whether these emissions will meet regional targets. Over time, ARB will revise its methodology for reviewing an SCS and work with MPOs to help them improve their modeling capabilities and evaluation of the impact of future Sustainable Communities Strategies on vehicle-related greenhouse gas emissions.

== Implications for environmental justice ==
Since its passage, SB 375 has garnered some controversy in relation to its environmental justice-related implications. The development and drafting process of SCS plans allow for minority and low-income communities to take advantage of opportunities to participate in the application of the bill so that ideas of equity are incorporated into its implementation. SB 375 specifies that regional planning agencies must implement a public participation plan for the drafting of the SCS. SB 375 requires that the SCS for each region in California include the RHNA requirement to provide housing to people of all income levels. The Regional Targets Advisory Committee which recommends ways to reduce emissions to each of California's regions is made up of local governmental representatives as well as members of the public, affected air districts, and regional coalitions. Also, the CEQA exemption and streamlining provision would possibly make particular projects more difficult to litigate and the CEQA streamlining benefits have led multiple environmental groups to withdraw their support for the bill.

Although SB 375 supports increased density development surrounding main transit stops, this does not guarantee an increase in affordable options for housing and may even increase land values in these places, which may lead to the displacement of the people who live there. Another way in which the bill contributes to environmental justice is that the bill requires each city to show where housing will be situated in order to meet housing allocations for residents of varying income levels and SB 375 provides direct action to curb urban sprawl as well. According to a research study on accessory dwelling units by the UC Berkeley College of Environmental Design, California's implementation of SB 375 has indeed placed more pressure on particular neighborhoods to promote affordable housing development and infill. For example, the San Francisco Bay Area is dealing with the challenges of infilling which may lead to increases in the cost of housing and further escalate the economic crisis for the communities there.

There have been claims that SB 375 increases pressure from gentrification and does not improve the livelihoods of low-income neighborhoods with higher levels of minority populations. The pressure from gentrification may lead to population migration such that poorer residents may be displaced by wealthy newcomers as a result of the SB 375 investments that fund particular infrastructure and projects in accordance with the bill. These claims further blame the bill for lacking positive funding as well as restrictions on sprawl. Moreover, opponents of the bill claim that while the bill may promote development near transit areas in urban neighborhoods, they claim that other factors such as crime rate and employment levels in these neighborhoods must not be ignored in the passage of these bills.

In addition, environmental justice advocates claim that SB 375 could lead MPOs to allocate more resources to high income as well as to suburban rail expansion and will lead to inequitable transit systems and lower housing affordability. They also claim that equitable reforms will not take place under the bill because they believe that the bill may generate urban development patterns that displace low-income communities and communities of color. Another significant concern is that the CEQA exemptions can be used to weaken advocacy efforts in communities of color and low-income communities. Although SB 375 has an obligation to generate and reserve affordable housing for the public, these advocates are concerned with the implications that may arise from the implementation of each SCS that results from SB 375.

== See also ==
- Global Warming Solutions Act of 2006
