= California's 27th senatorial district =

American legislative district

California's 27th State Senate district
Current senator
Henry Stern; D–Malibu
- Population (2010) • Voting age • Citizen voting age: 935,656; 717,882; 587,906
- Demographics: 58.17% White; 3.03% Black; 24.84% Latino; 12.47% Asian; 0.47% Native American; 0.20% Hawaiian/Pacific Islander; 0.32% other; 0.49% remainder of multiracial
- Registered voters: 598,999
- Registration: 43.46% Democratic; 27.28% Republican; 23.45% No party preference

California's 27th senatorial district is one of 40 California State Senate districts. It is currently represented by Democrat Henry Stern of Malibu.

== District profile ==
The district straddles the Los Angeles–Ventura county border and encompasses most of Los Angeles's western suburbs. The district includes the Conejo Valley, parts of the San Fernando Valley, and a slice of the Santa Clarita Valley.

Los Angeles County – 6.3%

- Agoura Hills
- Calabasas
- Hidden Hills
- Los Angeles – 12.5%
  - Canoga Park
  - Chatsworth
  - Encino
  - Northridge – partial
  - Porter Ranch
  - Reseda
  - Tarzana
  - West Hills
  - Winnetka
  - Woodland Hills
- Malibu
- Santa Clarita – 19.8%
- Topanga
- Westlake Village

Ventura County – 38.7%

- Bell Canyon
- Casa Canejo
- Moorpark
- Oak Park
- Simi Valley
- Thousand Oaks

== Election results from statewide races ==
Year	Office	Results
2020	President	Biden 60.7 – 37.3%
2018	Governor	Newsom 58.7 – 41.3%
2018	Senator	Feinstein 57.4 – 42.6%
2016	President	Clinton 58.9 – 35.6%
2016	Senator	Harris 64.6 – 35.4%
2014	Governor	Brown 53.1 – 46.9%
2012	President	Obama 54.5 – 43.2%
2012	Senator	Feinstein 57.5 – 42.5%

== List of senators representing the district ==
Due to redistricting, the 27th district has been moved around different parts of the state. The current iteration resulted from the 2021 redistricting by the California Citizens Redistricting Commission.

Senators	Party	Years served	Electoral history	Counties represented
Walter Van Dyke (Eureka)	Union; Democratic	January 6, 1862 – December 7, 1863	Elected in 1861. [data missing]	Del Norte, Klamath, Humboldt
Walter Van Dyke (Eureka)	Union	January 6, 1862 – December 7, 1863	Elected in 1861. [data missing]	Del Norte, Klamath, Humboldt
S. P. Wright (Crescent City)	Union	December 7, 1863 – December 4, 1865	Elected in 1862. Re-elected in 1863. [data missing]	Del Norte, Klamath, Humboldt
L. H. Murch (Oakland)	Union	December 4, 1865 – December 4, 1871	Elected in 1865. Re-elected in 1867. [data missing]	Del Norte, Klamath, Humboldt
L. H. Murch (Oakland)	Republican	December 4, 1865 – December 4, 1871	Elected in 1865. Re-elected in 1867. [data missing]	Del Norte, Klamath, Humboldt
John J. De Haven (Eureka)	Republican	December 4, 1871 – December 6, 1875	Elected in 1871. [data missing]	Del Norte, Klamath, Humboldt
Robert McGarvey (Ukiah)	Independent	December 6, 1875 – January 5, 1880	Elected in 1875. [data missing]	Del Norte, Humboldt, Mendocino
Pierce H. Ryan (Eureka)	Workingmen	January 5, 1880 – January 5, 1885	Elected in 1880. [data missing]	Del Norte, Humboldt, Mendocino
Pierce H. Ryan (Eureka)	Democratic	January 5, 1880 – January 5, 1885	Elected in 1880. [data missing]	Del Norte, Humboldt, Mendocino
Belden G. Hurlburt (San Francisco)	Republican	January 5, 1885 – January 3, 1887	Elected in 1884. [data missing]	San Francisco
Thomas J. Clunie (San Francisco)	Democratic	January 3, 1887 – January 7, 1889	Elected in 1886. Retired to run for U.S. House of Representatives.	San Francisco
John E. Hamill (San Francisco)	Democratic	January 7, 1889 – January 2, 1893	Elected in 1888. [data missing]	San Francisco
Guy C. Earl (Oakland)	Republican	January 2, 1893 – January 4, 1897	Elected in 1892. [data missing]	Alameda
Frederick S. Stratton (Oakland)	Republican	January 4, 1897 – January 1, 1901	Elected in 1896. [data missing]	Alameda
George R. Lukens (Oakland)	Republican	January 1, 1901 – January 2, 1905	Elected in 1900. Redistricted to the 15th district.	Alameda
Eli Wright (San Jose)	Republican	January 2, 1905 – February 27, 1905	Elected in 1904. Expelled for accepting bribes.	Santa Clara
Vacant		February 27, 1905 – January 7, 1907		Santa Clara
George S. Walker (San Jose)	Republican	January 7, 1907 – January 6, 1913	Elected in 1906. Re-elected in 1908. [data missing]	Santa Clara
Frank H. Benson (San Jose)	Republican	January 6, 1913 – January 3, 1921	Elected in 1912. Re-elected in 1916. [data missing]	Santa Clara
A. E. Osborne (Los Gatos)	Republican	January 3, 1921 – January 5, 1925	Elected in 1920. [data missing]	Santa Clara
Sanborn Young (Los Gatos)	Republican	January 5, 1925 – January 2, 1933	Elected in 1924. Re-elected in 1928. [data missing]	Santa Clara
Charles King (Hanford)	Democratic	January 2, 1933 – January 4, 1937	Elected in 1932. [data missing]	Kings
Robert R. Cunningham (Hanford)	Democratic	January 4, 1937 – January 5, 1953	Elected in 1936. Re-elected in 1940. Re-elected in 1944. Re-elected in 1948. [data missing]	Kings
Robert I. Montgomery (Hanford)	Democratic	January 5, 1953 – January 2, 1961	Elected in 1952. Re-elected in 1956. [data missing]	Kings
Robert D. Williams (Armona)	Democratic	January 2, 1961 – January 2, 1967	Elected in 1960. Re-elected in 1964. [data missing]	Kings
George E. Danielson (Los Angeles)	Democratic	January 2, 1967 – January 12, 1971	Elected in 1966. Re-elected in 1968. Resigned to become a member of the U.S. House of Representatives.	Los Angeles
Vacant		January 12, 1971 – July 29, 1971		Los Angeles
David Roberti (Los Angeles)	Democratic	July 29, 1971 – November 30, 1976	Elected to finish Danielson's term. Re-elected in 1972. Redistricted to the 23rd district.	Los Angeles
Robert G. Beverly (Manhattan Beach)	Republican	December 6, 1976 – November 30, 1984	Elected in 1976. Re-elected in 1980. Redistricted to the 29th district.	Los Angeles
Bill Greene (Los Angeles)	Democratic	December 3, 1984 – November 30, 1992	Redistricted from the 29th district and re-elected in 1984. Re-elected in 1988. Retired.	Los Angeles
Robert G. Beverly (Manhattan Beach)	Republican	December 7, 1992 – November 30, 1996	Redistricted from the 29th district and re-elected in 1992. Retired due to term limits.	Los Angeles
Betty Karnette (Long Beach)	Democratic	December 2, 1996 – November 30, 2004	Elected in 1996. Re-elected in 2000. Retired to run for State Assembly.	Los Angeles
Alan Lowenthal (Long Beach)	Democratic	December 6, 2004 – November 30, 2012	Elected in 2004. Re-elected in 2008. Retired to run for U.S. House of Representatives.	Los Angeles
Fran Pavley (Agoura Hills)	Democratic	December 3, 2012 – November 30, 2016	Redistricted to the 23rd district and re-elected in 2012. Retired due to term limits.	Los Angeles, Ventura
Henry Stern (Malibu)	Democratic	December 5, 2016 – present	Elected in 2016. Re-elected in 2020. Re-elected in 2024.	Los Angeles, Ventura

== Election results (1990-present) ==
=== 2024 ===
2024 California State Senate 27th district election
Primary election
Party	Candidate	Votes	%
Democratic	Henry Stern (incumbent)	98,160	44.1
Republican	Lucie Volotzky	84,758	38.1
Democratic	Susan A. Collins	39,488	17.8
Total votes		222,406	100.0
General election
Democratic	Henry Stern (incumbent)	270,005	59.5
Republican	Lucie Volotzky	183,967	40.5
Total votes		453,972	100.0
Democratic hold			

=== 2020 ===
2020 California State Senate 27th district election
Primary election
Party	Candidate	Votes	%
Democratic	Henry Stern (incumbent)	158,184	63.8
Republican	Houman Salem	89,646	36.2
Total votes		247,830	100.0
General election
Democratic	Henry Stern (incumbent)	284,797	60.2
Republican	Houman Salem	188,421	39.8
Total votes		473,218	100.0
Democratic hold			

=== 2016 ===
2016 California State Senate 27th district election
Primary election
Party	Candidate	Votes	%
Republican	Steve Fazio	77,770	37.1
Democratic	Henry Stern	57,189	27.3
Democratic	Janice Kamenir-Reznik	40,250	19.2
Democratic	David Pollock	15,359	7.3
Democratic	Shawn Bayliss	12,757	6.1
Democratic	George Christopher Thomas	6,143	2.9
Total votes		209,468	100.0
General election
Democratic	Henry Stern	218,655	55.9
Republican	Steve Fazio	172,827	44.1
Total votes		377,256	100.0
Democratic hold			

=== 2012 ===
2012 California State Senate 27th district election
Primary election
Party	Candidate	Votes	%
Republican	Todd Zink	68,384	51.1
Democratic	Fran Pavley (incumbent)	65,552	48.9
Total votes		133,936	100.0
General election
Democratic	Fran Pavley (incumbent)	197,757	53.6
Republican	Todd Zink	171,438	46.4
Total votes		369,195	100.0
Democratic hold			

=== 2008 ===
2008 California State Senate 27th district election
Party	Candidate	Votes	%
Democratic	Alan Lowenthal (incumbent)	171,668	67.3
Republican	Allen Wood	83,268	32.7
Total votes		254,936	100.0
Democratic hold			

=== 2004 ===
2004 California State Senate 27th district election
Party	Candidate	Votes	%
Democratic	Alan Lowenthal	150,289	63.3
Republican	Cesar Navarro Castellanos	87,319	36.7
Total votes		237,608	100.0
Democratic hold			

=== 2000 ===
2000 California State Senate 27th district election
Party	Candidate	Votes	%
Democratic	Betty Karnette (incumbent)	157,577	60.9
Republican	Marilyn Lyon	101,170	39.1
Total votes		258,747	100.0
Democratic hold			

=== 1996 ===
1996 California State Senate 27th district election
Party	Candidate	Votes	%
Democratic	Betty Karnette	126,562	51.4
Republican	Phil Hawkins	119,641	48.6
Total votes		246,203	100.0
Democratic gain from Republican			

=== 1992 ===
1992 California State Senate 27th district election
Party	Candidate	Votes	%
Republican	Robert G. Beverly (incumbent)	129,010	47.3
Democratic	Brian Finander	123,956	45.4
Libertarian	David J. Rosen	10,828	4.0
Peace and Freedom	Patrick McCoy	8,999	3.3
Total votes		272,793	100.0
Republican gain from Democratic			

== See also ==
- California State Senate
- California State Senate districts
- Districts in California
