= Fran Pavley =

American politician and educator

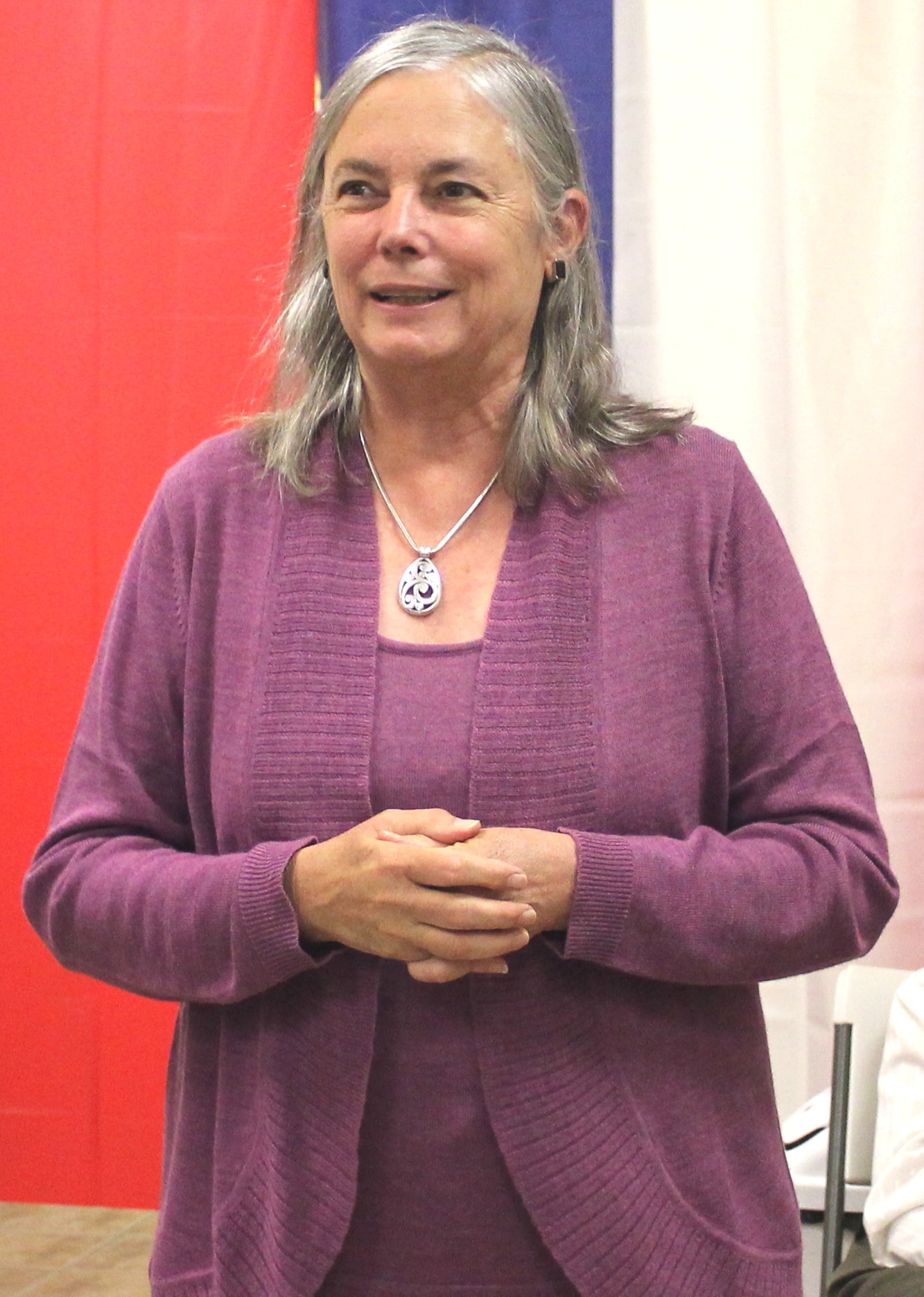
- Pavley in 2012

Member of the California State Senate
- In office December 1, 2008 – November 30, 2016
- Preceded by: Sheila Kuehl
- Succeeded by: Henry Stern
- Constituency: 23rd district (2008–2012); 27th district (2012–2016)

Member of the California State Assembly from the 41st district
- In office December 4, 2000 – November 30, 2006
- Preceded by: Sheila Kuehl
- Succeeded by: Julia Brownley

Personal details
- Born: November 11, 1948 (age 77) Los Angeles, California
- Party: Democratic
- Spouse: Andy
- Children: Jennifer; David
- Education: California State University, Fresno (BA); California State University, Northridge (MA)
- Profession: Teacher

Frances J. "Fran" Pavley (born November 11, 1948) is an American politician who served two terms in the California State Senate and three terms in the California State Assembly. A Democrat, she last represented the 27th Senate District, which encompasses the Conejo Valley, and portions of the San Fernando and Santa Clarita Valleys. Due to term limits in California, Senator Pavley completed her legislative career in 2016. She is currently working as the Environmental Policy Director for the USC Schwarzenegger Institute.

Before being elected to the State Senate in 2008, Pavley served in the California State Assembly, representing the 41st Assembly District. She was also the first Mayor of Agoura Hills. She was a middle school teacher for 29 years.

Pavley is known for her pioneering work on environmental and climate change legislation. She was an author of AB 32, the Global Warming Solutions Act of 2006, which created a multi-sector emissions reduction target to reduce greenhouse gas emissions and a cap and trade system. In 2016, she cemented her legacy by authoring and passing SB 32, which extended California's emissions reduction goals to 40 percent below 1990 levels by 2030.

== Background ==
Pavley is a native Angeleno and grew up in Sherman Oaks. She has lived in Agoura Hills with her husband, Andy, for over 40 years, where they raised their two children, as well as four guide dogs.

She received her master's degree in Environmental Planning at CSU Northridge, taught middle school for 29 years and completed her teaching career in Moorpark. In 1982, Pavley became the first mayor of the City of Agoura Hills, and served four terms on the city council. In 2000, she was elected to the California State Assembly where she served three terms.

== Local politics ==
During Pavley's time as Mayor, she founded the "Disaster Response Team," authored the city's "Transit Needs Study," and helped her city establish a new community center and gym as well as an equestrian facility. In 1997, she was awarded the "Distinguished Leadership Award" by the American Planning Association for her efforts.

Pavley was appointed to be a member of the California Coastal Commission from 1995 to 2000. She was a member of the Santa Monica Mountains Conservancy Advisory Committee and was President of the LA County Division League of California Cities in 1996.

== State Assembly ==
Pavley was elected to represent the 41st District in the California State Assembly for the maximum of three 2-year terms, from 2000 to 2006. Pavley was a member of the Assembly Budget Committee, the Education Committee, the Transportation Committee, and the Water, Parks and Wildlife Committee. She was the Chair of the Budget Committee on Resources.

=== Legislation ===
During her 14 years as a legislator, Pavley authored three major climate-change bills to reduce greenhouse gas emissions in California. In 2016, Governor Jerry Brown signed Pavley's SB 32, establishing a target to reduce GHG emissions to 40 percent below 1990 levels by 2030. The law extended and expanded upon AB 32, which Pavley co-authored in 2006 and was signed by Governor Arnold Schwarzenegger, that required a reduction in GHG emissions to 1990 levels by 2020. During her first term in the Assembly, Pavley authored AB 1493, requiring a reduction in GHG emissions from vehicle tailpipes, signed by Governor Gray Davis in 2002. In 2010 President Barack Obama implemented national clean car standards, modeled on AB 1493, also widely known as the "Pavley law." During a special ceremony in the White House Rose Garden, the President personally thanked Senator Pavley for her work on creating a clean, safe, secure energy future for California and the United States.

Some of Pavley's legislative victories in the Senate included authoring laws establishing California's first statewide regulation of groundwater basins (SB 1168, SGMA) and SB 1425, the water-energy nexus law that measures the carbon intensity in the movement and treating of water; stiffening penalties for mortgage fraud; banning lead and cadmium in children's jewelry; implementing California's first regulations for oil and gas well stimulation techniques like fracking and acidizing; and setting new safety standards for gas storage wells in response to the massive gas leak at Porter Ranch, Los Angeles in her district.

== State Senate ==
Pavley was elected to the 23rd State Senate District in 2008 by a wide margin. In 2012, redistricting changed the legislative boundaries and she ran in the 27th State Senate District in 2012. In the Senate, Pavley served as chair of the Senate Natural Resources and Water Committee. In addition, she was a member of the following Senate committees: Health, Energy, Utilities and Communications; Transportation and Housing, as well as Environmental Quality. Pavley also chaired a Select Committee on Climate Change and AB 32 Implementation, and served on the Select Committee on Autism.

== Climate policy ==
Pavley's role in establishing California's nation-leading policies to reduce greenhouse gas emissions led syndicated columnist Joe Mathews to describe her in 2016 as "the mother of California climate change policy." Following passage of California's clean car law in 2002, which was later adopted by 13 other states, Pavley was named by Governing magazine as one of the United States' top public officials of the year. She traveled broadly nationally and internationally to speak on climate policy, and was a member of the California delegation attending UN Climate Conferences in Copenhagen in 2009 and Paris in 2015. As the end of her final term in the Legislature approached, former Governor Gray Davis told CALmatters that she would be nearly impossible to replace as an environmental leader. "That's like saying, 'Who's going to be the next Babe Ruth or the next Steve Jobs?'" Davis said. "We're talking Olympian stature here with Fran."

== Post-legislative career ==
Pavley currently serves as the Environmental Policy Director of the USC Schwarzenegger Institute. She has also been appointed to the Wildlife Conservation Board and the Santa Monica Mountains Conservancy Board. In addition, she continues to work with other advocates on the construction of a wildlife crossing over the busy 101 freeway. Pavley also serves as a member of boards and committees including New Energy Nexus, Cal-ETC, and UCLA Law's Emmett Institute on Climate Change & the Environment.

== See also ==
- Members of the California State Legislature
