= California Climate Action Registry =

- Founded: October 13, 2001
- Location: 523 W. 6th Street, Los Angeles, CA
- Key people: Gary Gero, President
- Website: www.climateregistry.org

The California Climate Action Registry was established by California statute as a non-profit voluntary registry for greenhouse gas emissions. The purpose of the Registry is to help companies and organizations with operations in the state to establish GHG emissions baselines against which any future GHG emission reduction requirements may be applied. The California Registry provides leadership on climate change by developing and promoting credible, accurate and consistent GHG reporting standards and tools for organizations to measure, monitor, third-party verify and reduce their GHG emissions consistently across industry sectors and geographical borders. In turn, the State of California offers its best efforts to ensure that California Registry members receive appropriate consideration for early action in light of future state, federal or international GHG regulatory programs.

It was created on October 13, 2001, when Gray Davis signed the legislation establishing it (Senate Bills 1771 and 527). The legislation was first introduced by Senator Byron Sher.
