= Electric power industry =

Industry that provides the production and delivery of electric energy

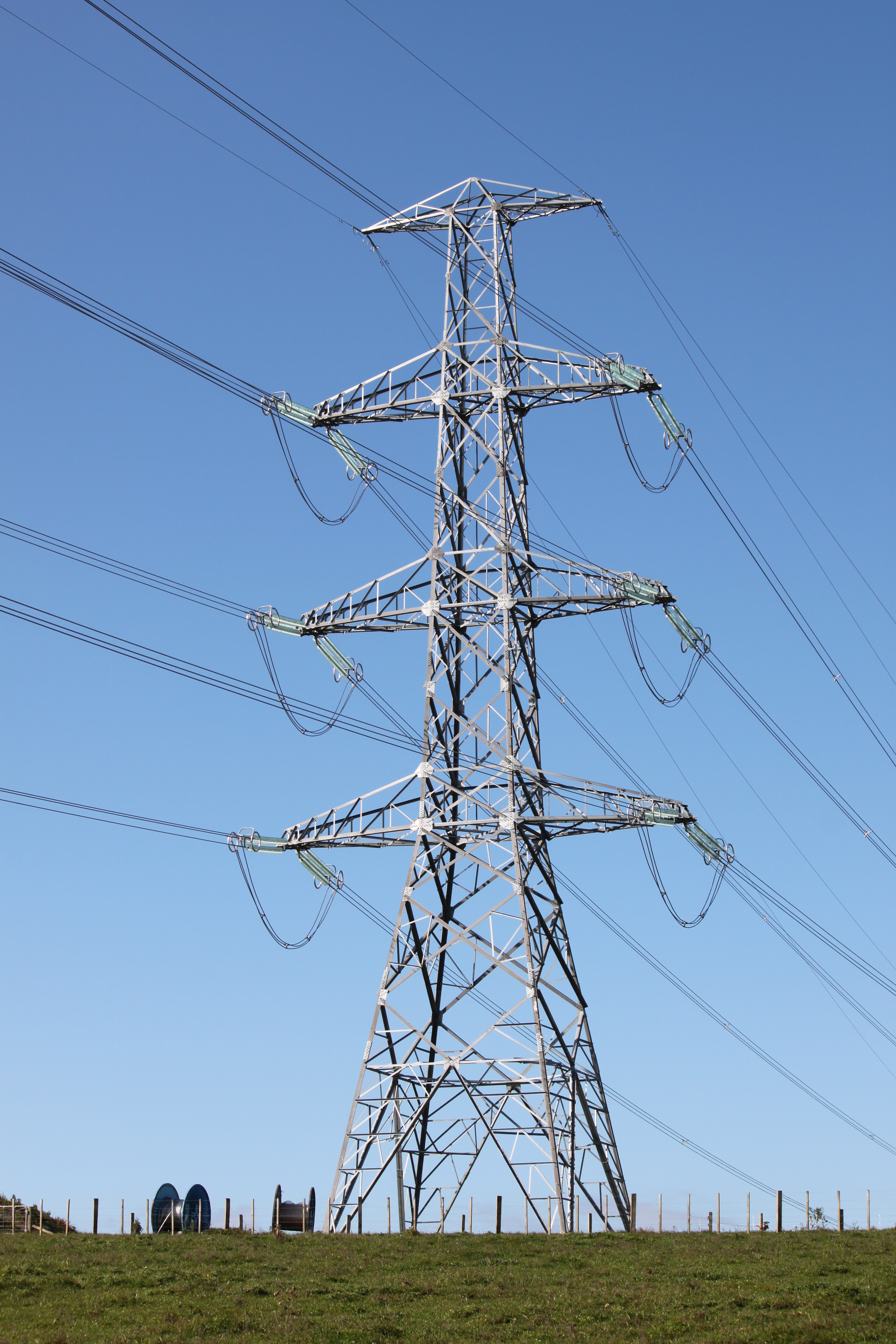
Electric power is transmitted on overhead lines like these, and also on underground high-voltage cables

The electric power industry covers the generation, transmission, distribution and sale of electric power to the general public and industry. The commercial distribution of electric power started in 1882 when electricity was produced for electric lighting. In the 1880s and 1890s, growing economic and safety concerns lead to the regulation of the industry. What was once an expensive novelty limited to the most densely populated areas, reliable and economical electric power has become an essential aspect for normal operation of all elements of developed economies.

By the middle of the 20th century, electricity was seen as a "natural monopoly", only efficient if a restricted number of organizations participated in the market; in some areas, vertically integrated companies provide all stages from generation to retail, and only governmental supervision regulated the rate of return and cost structure.

Since the 1990s, many regions have broken up the generation and distribution of electric power. While such markets can be abusively manipulated with consequent adverse price and reliability impact to consumers, generally competitive production of electrical energy leads to worthwhile improvements in efficiency. However, transmission and distribution are harder problems since returns on investment are not as easy to find.

== History ==
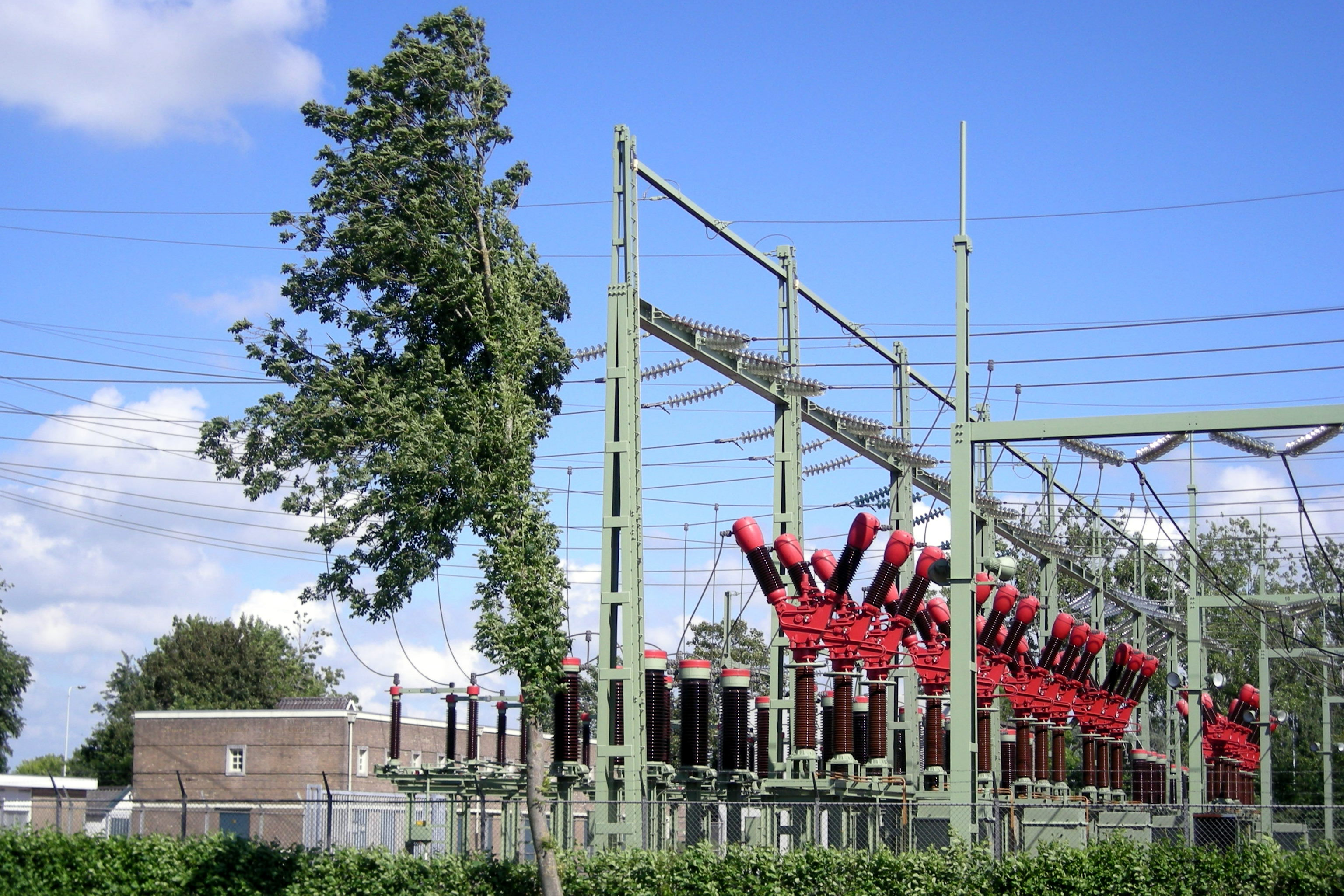
Bolsward Substation, the Netherlands

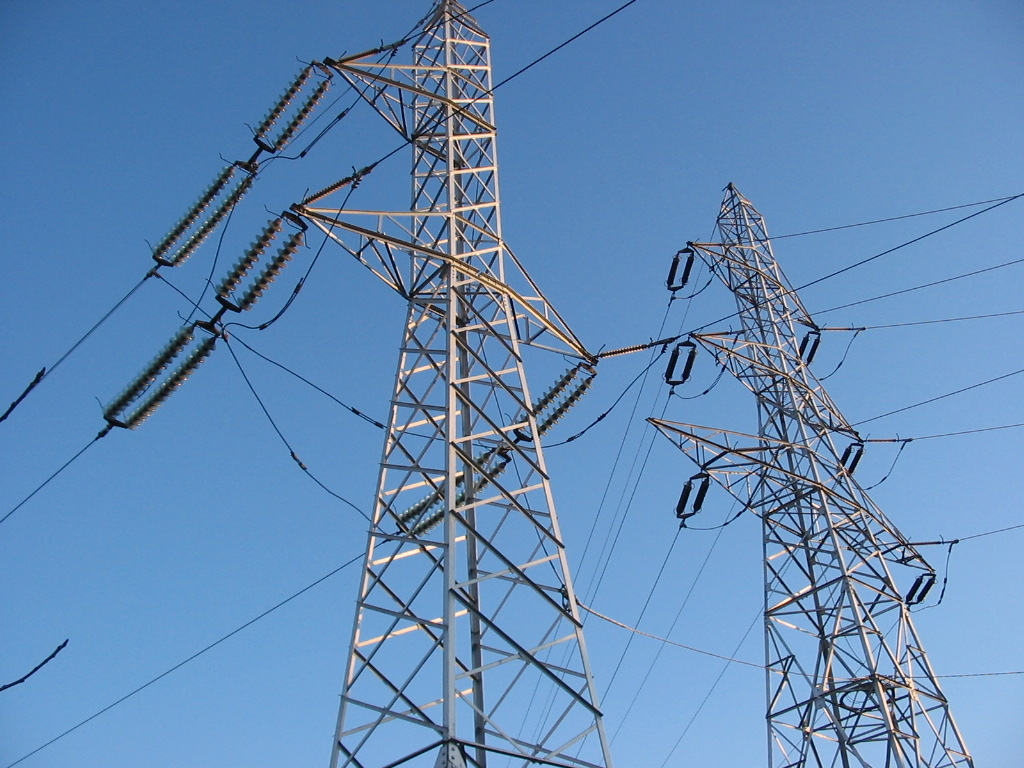
Transmission lines in Romania of which the nearest is a Phase Transposition Tower

Although electricity had been known to be produced as a result of the chemical reactions that take place in an electrolytic cell since Alessandro Volta developed the voltaic pile in 1800, its production by this means was, and still is, expensive. In 1831, Michael Faraday devised a machine that generated electricity from rotary motion, but it took almost 50 years for the technology to reach a commercially viable stage. In 1878, in the United States, Thomas Edison developed and sold a commercially viable replacement for gas lighting and heating using locally generated and distributed direct current electricity.

Robert Hammond, in December 1881, demonstrated the new electric light in the Sussex town of Brighton in the UK for a trial period. The ensuing success of this installation enabled Hammond to put this venture on both a commercial and legal footing, as a number of shop owners wanted to use the new electric light. Thus the Hammond Electricity Supply Co. was launched.

In early 1882, Edison opened the world's first steam-powered electricity generating station at Holborn Viaduct in London, where he had entered into an agreement with the City Corporation for a period of three months to provide street lighting. In time he had supplied a number of local consumers with electric light. The method of supply was direct current (DC). Whilst the Godalming and the 1882 Holborn Viaduct Scheme closed after a few years the Brighton Scheme continued on, and supply was in 1887 made available for 24 hours per day.

It was later on in the year in September 1882 that Edison opened the Pearl Street Power Station in New York City and again it was a DC supply. It was for this reason that the generation was close to or on the consumer's premises as Edison had no means of voltage conversion. The voltage chosen for any electrical system is a compromise. For a given amount of power transmitted, increasing the voltage reduces the current and therefore reduces the required wire thickness. Unfortunately it also increases the danger from direct contact and increases the required insulation thickness. Furthermore, some load types were difficult or impossible to make work with higher voltages. The overall effect was that Edison's system required power stations to be within a mile of the consumers. While this could work in city centres, it would be unable to economically supply suburbs with power.

The mid to late 1880s saw the introduction of alternating current (AC) systems in Europe and the U.S. AC power had an advantage in that transformers, installed at power stations, could be used to raise the voltage from the generators, and transformers at local substations could reduce voltage to supply loads. Increasing the voltage reduced the current in the transmission and distribution lines and hence the size of conductors and distribution losses. This made it more economical to distribute power over long distances. Generators (such as hydroelectric sites) could be located far from the loads. AC and DC competed for a while, during a period called the war of the currents. The DC system was able to claim slightly greater safety, but this difference was not great enough to overwhelm the enormous technical and economic advantages of alternating current which eventually won out.

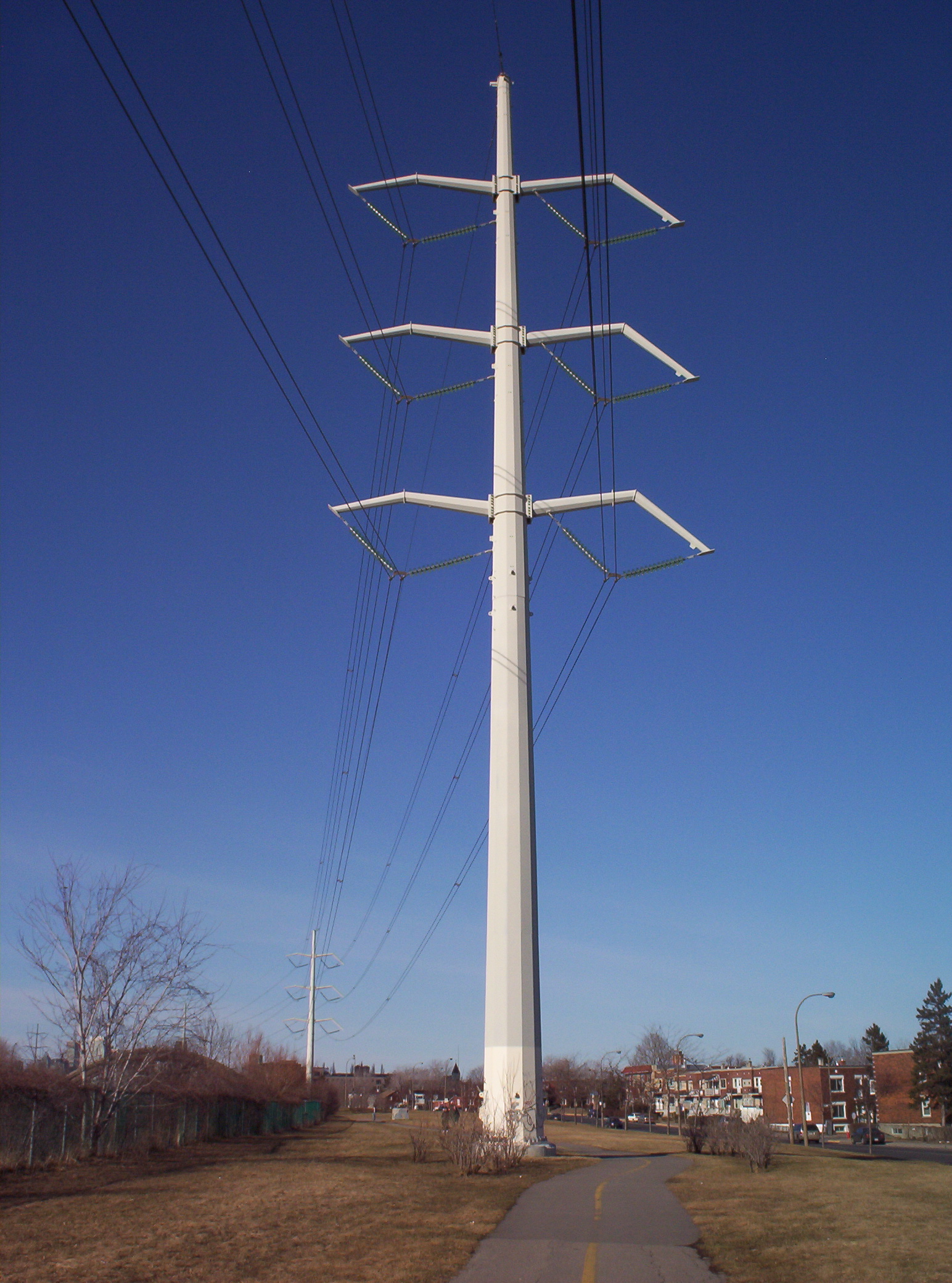
High tension line in Montreal, Quebec, Canada

The AC power system used today developed rapidly, backed by industrialists such as George Westinghouse with Mikhail Dolivo-Dobrovolsky, Galileo Ferraris, Sebastian Ziani de Ferranti, Lucien Gaulard, John Dixon Gibbs, Carl Wilhelm Siemens, William Stanley Jr., Nikola Tesla, and others contributed to this field.

Power electronics is the application of solid-state electronics to the control and conversion of electric power. Power electronics started with the development of the mercury arc rectifier in 1902, used to convert AC into DC. From the 1920s on, research continued on applying thyratrons and grid-controlled mercury arc valves to power transmission. Grading electrodes made them suitable for high voltage direct current (HVDC) power transmission. In 1933, selenium rectifiers were invented. Transistor technology dates back to 1947, with the invention of the point-contact transistor, which was followed by the bipolar junction transistor (BJT) in 1948. By the 1950s, higher power semiconductor diodes became available and started replacing vacuum tubes. In 1956, the silicon controlled rectifier (SCR) was introduced, increasing the range of power electronic applications.

A breakthrough in power electronics came with the invention of the MOSFET (metal-oxide-semiconductor field-effect transistor) in 1959. Generations of MOSFETs enabled power designers to achieve performance and density levels not possible with bipolar transistors. In 1969, Hitachi introduced the first vertical power MOSFET, which would later be known as the VMOS (V-groove MOSFET). The power MOSFET has since become the most common power device in the world, due to its low gate drive power, fast switching speed, easy advanced paralleling capability, wide bandwidth, ruggedness, easy drive, simple biasing, ease of application, and ease of repair.

While HVDC is increasingly being used to transmit large quantities of electricity over long distances or to connect adjacent asynchronous power systems, the bulk of electricity generation, transmission, distribution and retailing takes place using alternating current.

== Organization ==
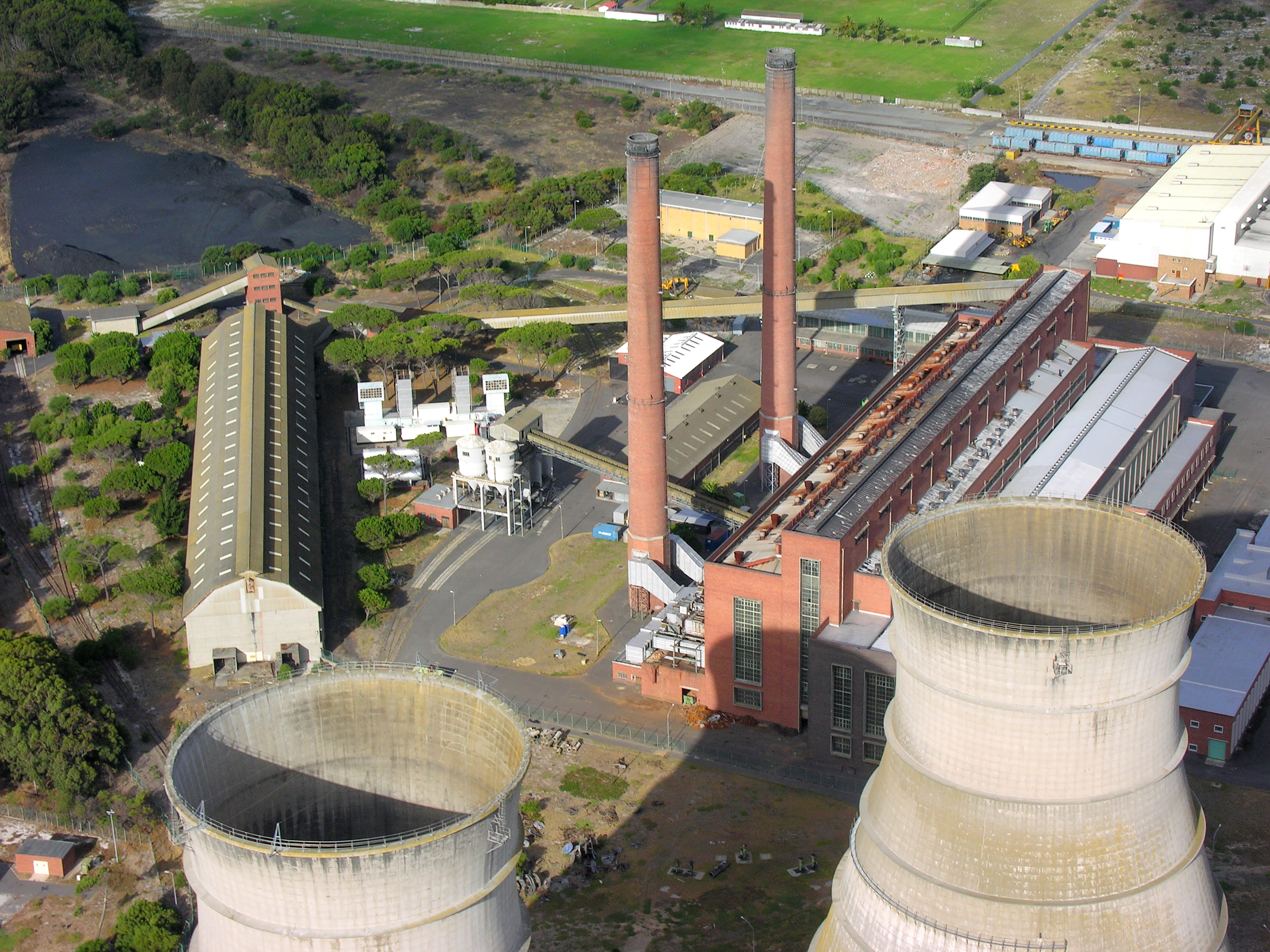
The Athlone Power Station in Cape Town, South Africa

The electric power industry is commonly split up into four processes. These are electricity generation such as a power station, electric power transmission, electricity distribution and electricity retailing. In many countries, electric power companies own the whole infrastructure from generating stations to transmission and distribution infrastructure. For this reason, electric power is viewed as a natural monopoly. The industry is generally heavily regulated, often with price controls and is frequently government-owned and operated. However, the modern trend has been growing deregulation in at least the latter two processes.

The nature and state of market reform of the electricity market often determines whether electric companies are able to be involved in just some of these processes without having to own the entire infrastructure, or citizens choose which components of infrastructure to patronise. In countries where electricity provision is deregulated, end-users of electricity may opt for more costly green electricity.

=== Generation ===
2024 world electricity generation by source in terawatt-hours (TWh). Total generation was 30.85 petawatt-hours.
1. Coal 10,587 (34.4%)
2. Natural gas 6,796 (22.1%)
3. Hydro 4,417 (14.4%)
4. Nuclear 2,765 (8.99%)
5. Wind 2,497 (8.12%)
6. Solar 2,130 (6.92%)
7. Other 1,569 (5.10%)

Generation is the conversion of some primary energy source into electric power suitable for commercial use on an electrical grid. Most commercial electric power is produced by rotating electrical machines, "generators", which move conductors through a magnetic field to produce electric current. The generator is rotated by some other prime mover machine; in typical grid-connected generators this is a steam turbine, a gas turbine, or a hydraulic turbine. Primary energy sources for these machine are often fossil fuels (coal, oil, natural gas), nuclear fission, geothermal steam, or falling water. Renewable sources such as wind and solar energy are increasingly of commercial importance.

Since electrical generation must be closely matched with electrical consumption, enough generation capacity must be installed to meet peak demands. At the same time, primary energy sources must be selected to minimize the cost of produced electrical energy. Generally the lowest-incremental-cost source of electrical energy will be the next unit connected to meet rising demand. Electrical generators have automatic controls to regulate the power fed into the electrical transmission system, adjusting generator output moment by moment to balance with electrical demand. For a large grid with scores or hundreds of generators connected and thousands of loads, management of stable generator supply is a problem with significant challenges, to meet economic, environmental and reliability requirements. For example, low-incremental-cost generation sources such as nuclear power plants may be run continually to meet the average "base load" of the connected system, whereas more costly peaking power plants such as natural gas turbines may be run for brief times during the day to meet peak loads. Alternatively, load management strategies may encourage more even demand for electrical power and reduce costly peaks. Designated generator units for a particular electrical grid may be run at partial output only, to provide "spinning reserve" for sudden increases in demand or faults with other generating units.

In addition to electrical power production, electrical generation units may provide other ancillary services to the electrical grid, such as frequency control, reactive power, and black start of a collapsed power grid. These ancillary services may be commercially valuable when the generation, transmission, and distribution electrical companies are separate commercial entities.

=== Electric power transmission ===
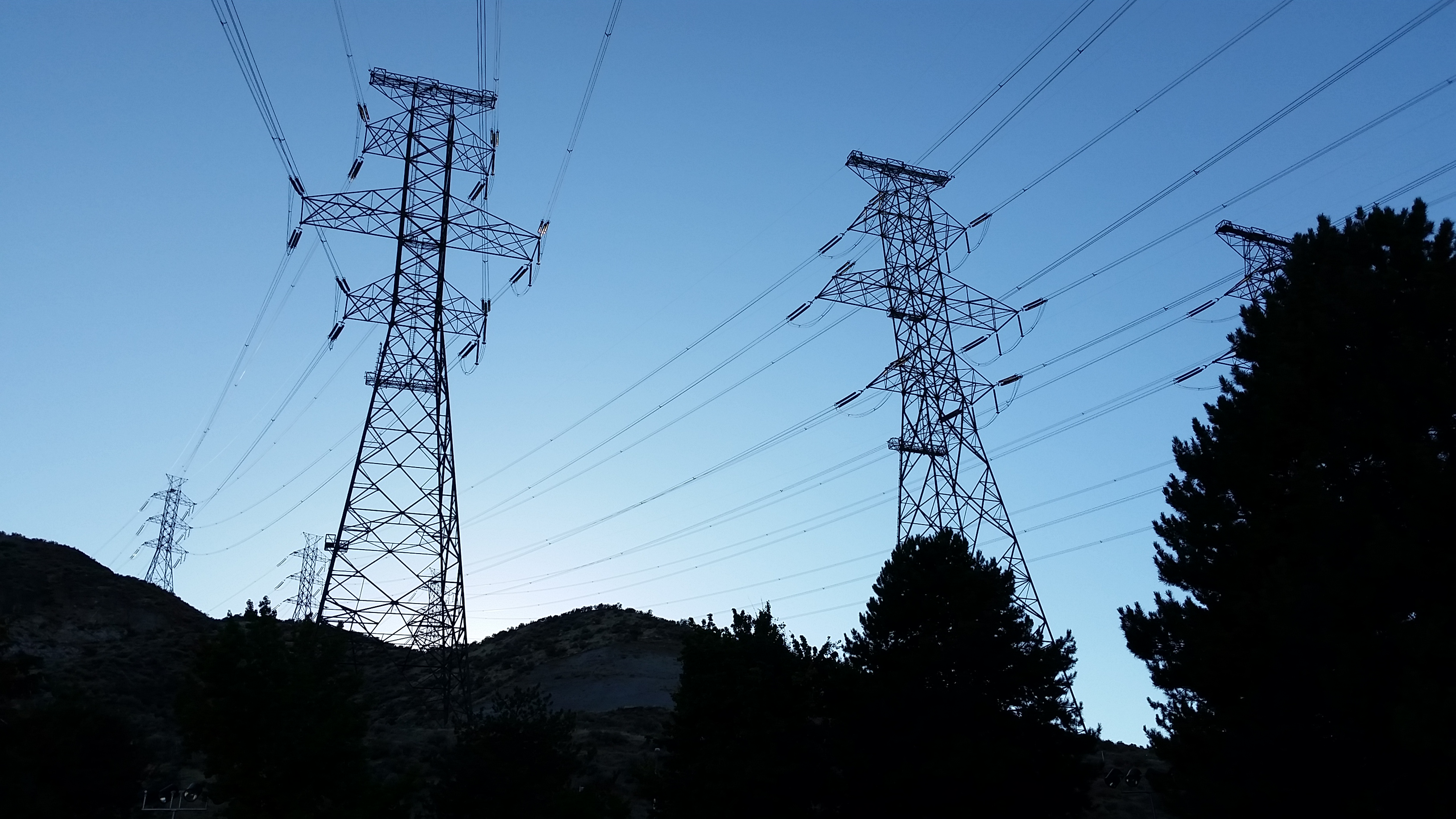
500 kV Three-phase electric power Transmission Lines at Grand Coulee Dam; four circuits are shown; two additional circuits are obscured by trees on the right; the entire 7079 MW generation capacity of the dam is accommodated by these six circuits.

Electric power transmission is the bulk movement of electrical energy from a generating site, such as a power plant, to an electrical substation. The interconnected lines which facilitate this movement are known as a transmission network. This is distinct from the local wiring between high-voltage substations and customers, which is typically referred to as electric power distribution. The combined transmission and distribution network is known as the "power grid" in North America, or just "the grid". In the United Kingdom, India, Malaysia and New Zealand, the network is known as the National Grid.

A wide area synchronous grid, also known as an "interconnection" in North America, directly connects many generators delivering AC power with the same relative frequency numerous consumers. For example, there are four major interconnections in North America (the Western Interconnection, the Eastern Interconnection, the Quebec Interconnection and the Electric Reliability Council of Texas (ERCOT) grid). In Europe one large grid connects most of continental Europe.

Historically, transmission and distribution lines were owned by the same company, but starting in the 1990s, many countries have liberalized the regulation of the electricity market in ways that have led to the separation of the electricity transmission business from the distribution business.

=== Electric power distribution ===
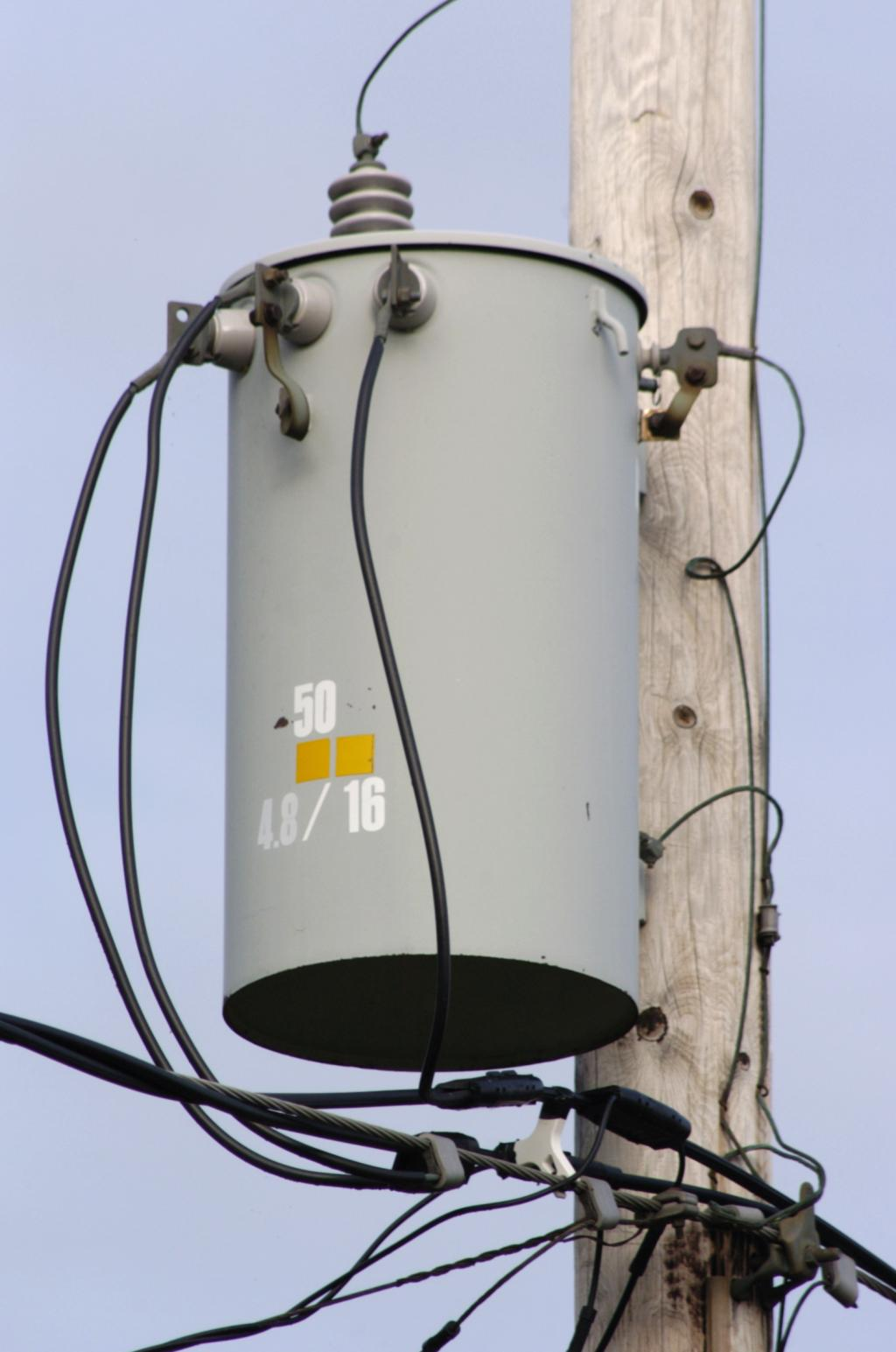
A 50 kVA pole-mounted distribution transformer

Electric power distribution is the final stage in the delivery of electric power; it carries electricity from the transmission system to individual consumers. Distribution substations connect to the transmission system and lower the transmission voltage to medium voltage ranging between 2 kV and 35 kV with the use of transformers. Primary distribution lines carry this medium voltage power to distribution transformers located near the customer's premises. Distribution transformers again lower the voltage to the utilization voltage used by lighting, industrial equipment or household appliances. Often several customers are supplied from one transformer through secondary distribution lines. Commercial and residential customers are connected to the secondary distribution lines through service drops. Customers demanding a much larger amount of power may be connected directly to the primary distribution level or the subtransmission level.

=== Electric retailing ===
Electricity retailing is the final sale of electricity from generation to the end-use consumer.

== World electricity industries ==
The organization of the electrical sector of a country or region varies depending on the economic system of the country. In some places, all electric power generation, transmission and distribution is provided by a government controlled organization. Other regions have private or investor-owned utility companies, city or municipally owned companies, cooperative companies owned by their own customers, or combinations. Generation, transmission and distribution may be offered by a single company, or different organizations may provide each of these portions of the system.

Not everyone has access to grid electricity. About 840 million people (mostly in Africa) had no access in 2017, down from 1.2 billion in 2010.

== Market reform ==
The business model behind the electric utility has changed over the years playing a vital role in shaping the electricity industry into what it is today; from generation, transmission, distribution, to the final local retailing. This has occurred prominently since the reform of the electricity supply industry in England and Wales in 1990.

=== United States ===
In 1996 – 1999 the Federal Energy Regulatory Commission (FERC) made a series of decisions which were intended to open the U.S. wholesale power market to new players, with the hope that spurring competition would save consumers $4 to $5 billion per year and encourage technical innovation in the industry. Steps were taken to give all market participants open access to existing interstate transmission lines.

- Order No. 888 ordered vertically integrated electric utilities to functionally separate their transmission, power generation and marketing businesses to prevent self-dealing.
- Order No. 889 set up a system to provide all participants with timely access to information about available transmission capacity and prices.
- The FERC also endorsed the concept of appointing independent system operators (ISOs) to manage the electric power grid – a function that was traditionally the responsibility of vertically integrated electric utility companies. The concept of an independent system operator evolved into that of regional transmission organizations (RTOs). FERC's intention was that all U.S. companies owning interstate electric transmission lines would place those facilities under the control of an RTO. In its Order No. 2000 (Regional Transmission Organizations), issued in 1999, FERC specified the minimum capabilities that an RTO should possess.

These decisions, which were intended to create a fully interconnected grid and an integrated national power market, resulted in the restructuring of the U.S. electricity industry. That process was soon dealt two setbacks: the California energy crisis of 2000, and the Enron scandal and collapse. Although industry restructuring proceeded, these events made clear that competitive markets could be manipulated and thus must be properly designed and monitored. Furthermore, the Northeast blackout of 2003 highlighted the need for a dual focus on competitive pricing and strong reliability standards.

=== Other countries ===
In some countries, wholesale electricity markets operate, with generators and retailers trading electricity in a similar manner to shares and currency. As deregulation continues further, utilities are driven to sell their assets as the energy market follows in line with the gas market in use of the futures and spot markets and other financial arrangements. Even globalization with foreign purchases are taking place. One such purchase was when the UK's National Grid, the largest private electric utility in the world, bought several electric utilities in New England for $3.2 billion. Between 1995 and 1997, seven of the 12 Regional Electric Companies (RECs) in England and Wales were bought by U.S. energy companies. Domestically, local electric and gas firms have merged operations as they saw the advantages of joint affiliation, especially with the reduced cost of joint-metering. Technological advances will take place in the competitive wholesale electric markets, such examples already being utilized include fuel cells used in space flight; aeroderivative gas turbines used in jet aircraft; solar engineering and photovoltaic systems; off-shore wind farms; and the communication advances spawned by the digital world, particularly with microprocessing which aids in monitoring and dispatching.

== Outlook ==
Electricity is expected to see growing demand in the future. The Information Revolution is highly reliant on electric power. Other growth areas include emerging new electricity-exclusive technologies, developments in space conditioning, industrial processes, and transportation (for example hybrid vehicles, locomotives).

== See also ==
- AC power
- Distributed generation
- Emissions & Generation Resource Integrated Database
- Meter Point Administration Number, a unique UK supply number
- National Grid (disambiguation)
- North American Electric Reliability Corporation
- Rate Case
- Reddy Kilowatt, a U.S. electricity corporate logo
- Samuel Insull
