= Robert Hammond =

Robert Hammond may refer to:

== Literary ==
- Robert Hammond (writer), American author, film producer and occasional actor
- Robert Hammond (author) (1920–2009), American film critic and professor of French

== Sports ==
- Robert Hammond (field hockey) (born 1981), Australian Olympic field hockey player
- Bobby Hammond (born 1952), American football running back
- Bob Hammond (1942–2020), Australian rules footballer
- Bob Hammond (footballer, born 1905) (1905–1993), Australian footballer
- Robert Hammond (footballer) (c. 1950–2017), Ghanaian footballer

== Other ==
- Robert H. Hammond (1791–1847), U.S. congressman from Pennsylvania
- Robert Hammond (Roundhead) (1621–1654), British noble and parliamentary governor of the Isle of Wight
- Robert Hammond (High Line) (born 1968/69), co-founder and executive director of Friends of the High Line
- Robert Hammond (electrical engineer) (1850–1915), English electrical engineer
- Robert Brodribb Hammond (1870-1946), Australian Anglican priest
- Robert C Hammond (sternwheeler), paddle steamer built for service on the upper Fraser and Nechako Rivers in Canada
- Robert R. Hammond, founder of Glastron Boats
