= COPERT =

- Developer(s): EMISIA SA European Environment Agency Joint Research Centre Aristotle University of Thessaloniki
- Operating system: Windows
- Available in: English
- Type: Emissions Calculation Tool
- License: Freeware
- Website: https://copert.emisia.com/

COPERT is an MS Windows software program aiming at the calculation of air pollutant emissions from road transport. The technical development of COPERT is financed by the European Environment Agency (EEA), in the framework of the activities of the European Topic Centre on Air and Climate Change. Since 2007, the European Commission's Joint Research Centre has been coordinating the further scientific development of the model. In principle, COPERT has been developed for use from the National Experts to estimate emissions from road transport to be included in official annual national inventories. The COPERT methodology is also part of the EMEP/CORINAIR Emission Inventory Guidebook. The Guidebook, developed by the UNECE Task Force on Emissions Inventories and Projections, is intended to support reporting under the UNECE Convention on Long-Range Transboundary Air Pollution and the EU directive on national emission limits. The COPERT methodology is fully consistent with the Road Transport chapter of the Guidebook. The use of a software tool to calculate road transport emissions allows for a transparent and standardized, hence consistent and comparable data collecting and emissions reporting procedure, in accordance with the requirements of international conventions and protocols and EU legislation.

== Features ==
- Calculation of Emissions from Road Transport
- Compilation of an emission inventory
- Calculation for different vehicle categories (passenger cars, light duty vehicles, heavy duty vehicles, mopeds and motorcycles)
- Pollutants covered:
  - major air pollutants (CO, NOx, VOC, PM, NH_{3}, SO_{2}, heavy metals)
  - greenhouse gas emissions (CO_{2}, N_{2}O, CH_{4})

== History ==
Version History

Older versions:

- COPERT 4 version 11.4 - September 2016
- COPERT 4 version 11.3 - June 2015
- COPERT 4 version 11.2 - January 2015
- COPERT 4 version 11.0 - September 2014
- COPERT 4 version 10.0 - November 2012
- COPERT 4 version 9.1 - August 2012
- COPERT 4 version 9.0 - October 2011
- COPERT 4 version 8.1 - May 2011
- COPERT 4 version 8.0 - October 2010
- COPERT 4 version 7.1 - March 2010
- COPERT 4 version 7.0 - December 2009
- COPERT 4 version 6.1 - February 2009
- COPERT 4 version 6.0 - December 2008
- COPERT 4 version 5.1 - February 2008
- COPERT 4 Version 5.0 - December 2007
- COPERT 4 Version 4.0 - October 2007
- COPERT 4 Version 3.0 - November 2006
- COPERT 4 Beta Version 2.0.0 - July 2006
- COPERT 4 Beta Version 1.4 - March 2006
- COPERT 4 Beta Version 1.0 - Dec 2005
- COPERT III Final Version 2.3 - July 2002

== See also ==
- Emission Inventory
- Handbook Emission Factors for Road Transport (HBEFA)
