= Electric power =

Rate at which electrical energy is transferred by an electric circuit

Power
- Common symbols: ℘ or P
- SI unit: watt (W)
- In SI base units: kg⋅m^{2}⋅s^{−3}
- Derivations from other quantities: ℘ = E/t; ℘ = F·v; ℘ = U·I; ℘ = τ·ω
- Dimension: $\mathsf{L}^2 \mathsf{M} \mathsf{T}^{-3}$

Share of the population with access to electricity

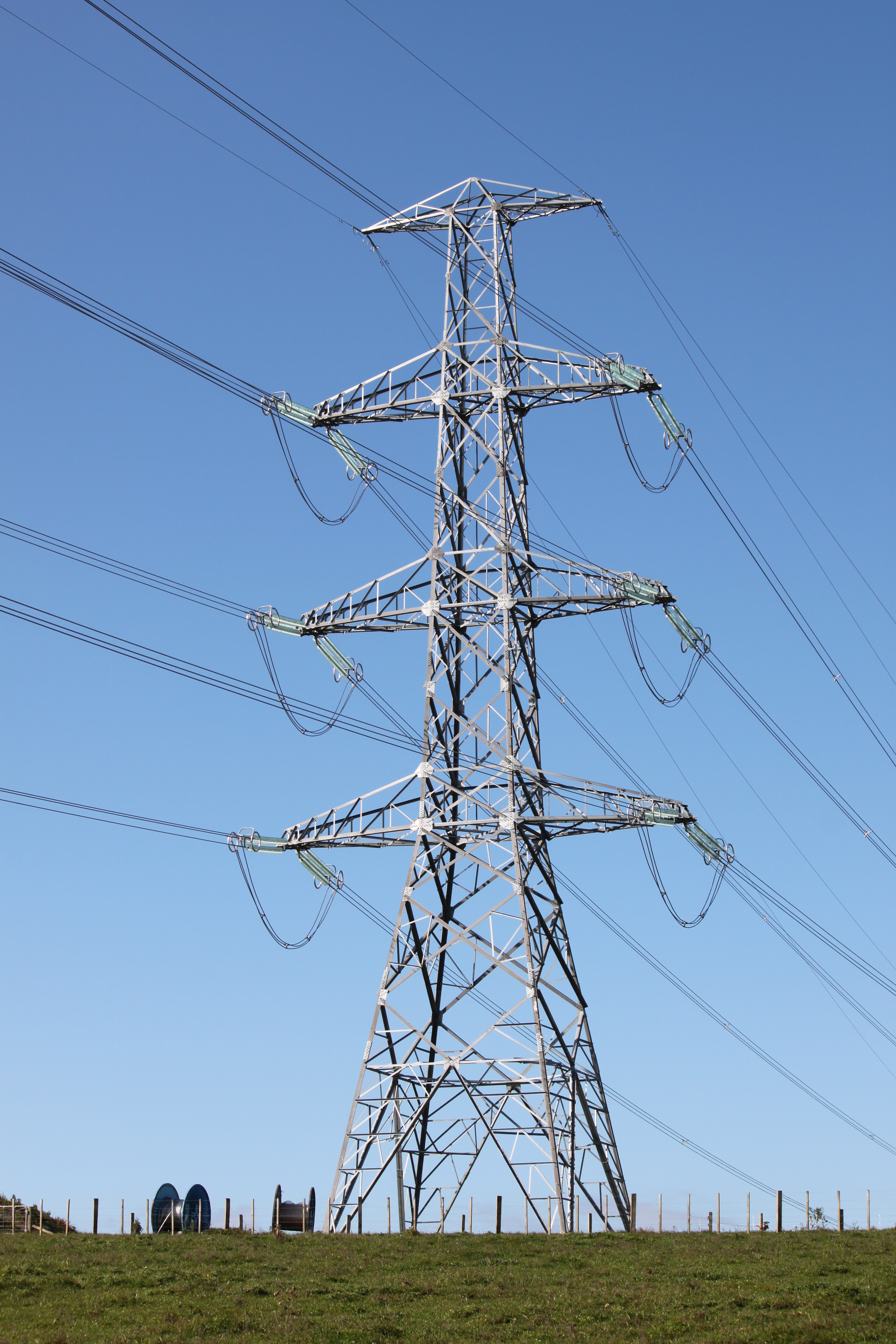
Electric power is transmitted by overhead lines like these, and also through underground high-voltage cables.

Electric power is the rate of transfer of electrical energy within a circuit. Its SI unit is the watt, the general unit of power, defined as one joule per second. Standard prefixes apply to watts as with other SI units: thousands, millions and billions of watts are called kilowatts, megawatts and gigawatts respectively.

In common parlance, electric power is the production and delivery of electrical energy, an essential public utility in much of the world. Electric power is usually produced by electric generators, but can also be supplied by sources such as electric batteries. It is usually supplied to businesses and homes (as domestic mains electricity) by the electric power industry through an electrical grid.

Electric power can be delivered over long distances by transmission lines and used for applications such as motion, light or heat with high efficiency.

== Definition ==
Electric power, like mechanical power, is the rate of doing work, measured in watts, and represented by the letter P. The term wattage is used colloquially to mean "electric power in watts". The electric power in watts produced by an electric current I consisting of a charge of Q coulombs every t seconds passing through an electric potential (voltage) difference of V is:
$$\text{Work done per unit time} = P = \frac{W}{t} = V \times I$$
The voltage between two terminals is defined as the work required to move a unit charge from one terminal to the other against the force of the electric field, so this equation can be derived as

$P$	$=$	$\frac{W}{t}$	$=$	$\frac{W}{Q}$	$\times$	$\frac{Q}{t}$
		work done per unit time		work done moving a unit charge from one terminal to the other		amount of charge flowing through the circuit per unit time
			$=$	$V$	$\times$	$I$
				voltage		current

where:

- W is work in joules
- t is time in seconds
- Q is electric charge in coulombs
- V is electric potential or voltage in volts
- I is electric current in amperes

== Explanation ==
Animation showing power source

Animation showing electric load

Electric power is transformed to other forms of energy when electric charges move through an electric potential difference (voltage), which occurs in electrical components in electric circuits.

An often confusing aspect of the terminology is that the direction of electric current (conventional current) is defined as the direction that positive charge flows, but the actual mobile charge carriers in circuits are electrons, which have a negative charge. But a flow of positive charge in one direction is equivalent to an equal flow of negative charge in the other direction. So the electrons in the circuit flow in the opposite direction to the direction of conventional current.

=== Sources and loads ===
From the standpoint of electric power, components in an electric circuit can be divided into two categories:

- Active devices (power sources): if conventional electric current (positive charge) is forced to flow through the device in the direction from the lower electric potential to the higher, against the opposing force of the electric field (E) between the terminals (this is equivalent to the negatively charged electrons moving from the positive terminal to the negative terminal) work will be done on the charges. So energy is being converted to electric potential energy from some other type of energy, such as mechanical energy or chemical energy. Devices in which this occurs are called active devices or power sources; such as electric generators and batteries.
- Passive devices (loads): if conventional current flows through the device in a direction from higher potential to lower potential (equivalent to the negative electrons moving from the negative terminal to the positive terminal), in the same direction as the force of the electric field, work is done by the charges on the device. The potential energy of the charges due to the voltage between the terminals is converted to kinetic energy in the device. These devices are called passive components or loads; they 'consume' electric power from the circuit, converting it to other forms of energy such as mechanical work, heat, light, etc. Examples are electrical appliances, such as light bulbs, electric motors, and electric heaters.

Some devices can be either a source or a load, depending on the voltage and current through them. For example, a rechargeable battery acts as a source when it provides power to a circuit, but as a load when it is connected to a battery charger and is being recharged.

In alternating current (AC) circuits the direction of the voltage and current periodically reverses, but the definition of sources and loads is the same; in a source at any instant the current flows from the lower potential to the higher potential, while in a load the instantaneous current flows from the higher to lower potential.

=== Passive sign convention ===
Transmission of power through an electric circuit

Since electric power can flow either into or out of a component, a convention is needed for which direction represents positive power flow. Electric power flowing out of a circuit into a component is arbitrarily defined to have a positive sign, while power flowing into a circuit from a component is defined to have a negative sign. Thus passive components have positive power consumption, while power sources have negative power consumption. This is called the passive sign convention.

=== Resistive circuits ===
In the case of resistive (Ohmic, or linear) loads, the power formula (P = I·V) and Joule's first law (P = I^{2}·R) can be combined with Ohm's law (V = I·R) to produce alternative expressions for the amount of power that is dissipated:
$$\wp = I V = I^2 R = \frac{V^2}{R}$$
where R is the electrical resistance.

=== Alternating current ===
In alternating current (AC) circuits, the polarity of the voltage and the direction of current flow reverses twice each cycle. In resistive circuits, with no reactance, in which the current reverses at the same instant as the voltage reverses, the circuit behaves the same as a DC circuit described above, with power flowing out of sources and consumed by loads.

However, in circuits with energy storage elements such as inductance and capacitance, in addition to the energy being consumed by resistances, some of the energy flowing into passive components is stored temporarily and returned to the circuit each cycle. This may result in periodic reversals of the direction of energy flow. The portion of energy flow (power) that, averaged over a complete cycle of the AC waveform, results in net transfer of energy in one direction is known as real power (also referred to as active power). The amplitude of that portion of energy flow (power) that results in no net transfer of energy but instead oscillates between the source and load in each cycle due to stored energy, is known as the absolute value of reactive power. The product of the RMS value of the voltage wave and the RMS value of the current wave is known as apparent power. The real power P in watts consumed by a device is given by
$$\wp = {1 \over 2} V_p I_p \cos \theta = V_{\rm rms}I_{\rm rms} \cos \theta$$
where

- V_{p} is the peak voltage in volts
- I_{p} is the peak current in amperes
- V_{rms} is the root-mean-square voltage in volts
- I_{rms} is the root-mean-square current in amperes
- θ = θ_{v} − θ_{i} is the phase angle by which the voltage sine wave leads the current sine wave, or equivalently the phase angle by which the current sine wave lags the voltage sine wave

Power triangle: The components of AC power

The relationship between real power, reactive power and apparent power can be expressed by representing the quantities as vectors. Real power is represented as a horizontal vector and reactive power is represented as a vertical vector. The apparent power vector is the hypotenuse of a right triangle formed by connecting the real and reactive power vectors. This representation is often called the power triangle. Using the Pythagorean theorem, the relationship among real, reactive and apparent power is:
$$\text{(apparent power)}^2 = \text{(real power)}^2 + \text{(reactive power)}^2$$

Real and reactive powers can also be calculated directly from the apparent power, when the current and voltage are both sinusoids with a known phase angle θ between them:
$$\text{(real power)} = \text {(apparent power)}\cos \theta$$
$$\text{(reactive power)} = \text {(apparent power)}\sin \theta$$

The ratio of real power to apparent power is called power factor and is a number always between −1 and 1. Where the currents and voltages have non-sinusoidal forms, power factor is generalized to include the effects of distortion.

=== Electromagnetic fields ===
Electrical energy flows wherever electric and magnetic fields exist together and fluctuate in the same place. The simplest example of this is in electrical circuits, as the preceding section showed. In the general case, however, the simple equation P = IV may be replaced by a more complex calculation. The closed surface integral of the cross-product of the electric field intensity and magnetic field intensity vectors gives the total instantaneous power (in watts) out of the volume:
$$\wp = \oint_\text{area} (\mathbf{E} \times \mathbf{H}) \cdot d \mathbf{A}.$$

The result is a scalar since it is the surface integral of the Poynting vector.

== Production ==
=== Generation ===
2024 world electricity generation by source in terawatt-hours (TWh). Total generation was 30.85 petawatt-hours.
1. Coal 10,587 (34.4%)
2. Natural gas 6,796 (22.1%)
3. Hydro 4,417 (14.4%)
4. Nuclear 2,765 (8.99%)
5. Wind 2,497 (8.12%)
6. Solar 2,130 (6.92%)
7. Other 1,569 (5.10%)

The fundamental principles of much electricity generation were discovered during the 1820s and early 1830s by the British scientist Michael Faraday. His basic method is still used today: electric current is generated by the movement of a loop of wire, or disc of copper between the poles of a magnet.

For electric utilities, it is the first process in the delivery of electricity to consumers. The other processes, electricity transmission, distribution, and electrical energy storage and recovery using pumped-storage methods are normally carried out by the electric power industry.

Electricity is mostly generated at a power station by electromechanical generators, driven by heat engines heated by combustion, geothermal power or nuclear fission. Other generators are driven by the kinetic energy of flowing water and wind. There are many other technologies that are used to generate electricity such as photovoltaic solar panels.

A battery is a device consisting of one or more electrochemical cells that convert stored chemical energy into electrical energy. Since the invention of the first battery (or "voltaic pile") in 1800 by Alessandro Volta and especially since the technically improved Daniell cell in 1836, batteries have become a common power source for many household and industrial applications. According to a 2005 estimate, the worldwide battery industry generates US$48 billion in sales each year, with 6% annual growth. There are two types of batteries: primary batteries (disposable batteries), which are designed to be used once and discarded, and secondary batteries (rechargeable batteries), which are designed to be recharged and used multiple times. Batteries are available in many sizes; from miniature button cells used to power hearing aids and wristwatches to battery banks the size of rooms that provide standby power for telephone exchanges and computer data centers.

=== Electric power industry ===
The electric power industry provides the production and delivery of power, in sufficient quantities to areas that need electricity, through a grid connection. The grid distributes electrical energy to customers. Electric power is generated by central power stations or by distributed generation. The electric power industry has gradually been trending towards deregulation – with emerging players offering consumers competition to the traditional public utility companies.

== Uses ==
Electric power, produced from central generating stations and distributed over an electrical transmission grid, is widely used in industrial, commercial, and consumer applications. A country's per capita electric power consumption correlates with its industrial development. Electric motors power manufacturing machinery and propel subways and railway trains. Electric lighting is the most important form of artificial light. Electrical energy is used directly in processes such as extraction of aluminum from its ores and in production of steel in electric arc furnaces. Reliable electric power is essential to telecommunications and broadcasting. Electric power is used to provide air conditioning in hot climates, and in some places, electric power is an economically competitive energy source for building space heating. The use of electric power for pumping water ranges from individual household wells to irrigation and energy storage projects.

== See also ==
- EGRID
- Electric energy consumption
- Electric power system
- High-voltage cable
- Power engineering
- Rural electrification

== Bibliography ==
- Reports on August 2003 Blackout, North American Electric Reliability Council website
- Croft, Terrell; Summers, Wilford I. (1987). American Electricians' Handbook (Eleventh ed.). New York: McGraw Hill. ISBN 0-07-013932-6.
- Fink, Donald G.; Beaty, H. Wayne (1978). Standard Handbook for Electrical Engineers (Eleventh ed.). New York: McGraw Hill. ISBN 0-07-020974-X.
