= Emissions & Generation Resource Integrated Database =

Emissions & Generation Resource Integrated Database (eGRID)
- Developer: U.S. EPA
- Stable release: eGRID2023rev2 / June 12, 2025
- Website: https://www.epa.gov/egrid

The Emissions & Generation Resource Integrated Database (eGRID) is a comprehensive source of data on the environmental characteristics of almost all electric power generated in the United States. eGRID is issued by the U.S. Environmental Protection Agency (EPA).

As of January 2025, the available editions of eGRID contain data for years 2023, 2022, 2021, 2020, 2019, 2018, 2016, 2014, 2012, 2010, 2009, 2007, 2005, 2004, and 1996 through 2000. eGRID is unique in that it links air emissions data with electric generation data for United States power plants.

== History ==
- eGRID2023 was released by EPA on January 15, 2025, eGRID2023rev1 was released on January 17, 2025, and eGRIDrev2 was released June 12, 2025. It contains year 2023 data.
- eGRID2022 was released by EPA on January 30, 2024. It contains year 2022 data.
- eGRID2021 was released by EPA on January 30, 2023. It contains year 2021 data.
- eGRID2020 was released by EPA on January 27, 2022. It contains year 2020 data.
- eGRID2019 was released by EPA on February 23, 2021. It contains year 2019 data.
- eGRID2018 was released by EPA on January 28, 2020 and eGRID2018v2 was released on March 9, 2020. It contains year 2018 data.
- eGRID2016 was released by EPA on February 15, 2018. It contains year 2016 data.
- eGRID2014 was released by EPA on January 13, 2017. It contains year 2014 data.
- eGRID2012 was released by EPA on October 8, 2015. It is the 10th edition and contains year 2012 data.
- eGRID2010 Version 1.0 with year 2010 data was released on February 24, 2014.
- eGRID2009 Version 1.0, with year 2009 data was released on May 10, 2012.
- eGRID2007 Version 1.0 was released on February 23, 2011 and Version 1.1 was released May 20, 2011.
- eGRID2005 Version 1.0 was released in October 2008 and Version 1.1 was released in January 2009.
- eGRID2004 Version 1.0 was released in December 2006; Version 2.0 was released in early April 2007; and Version 2.1, was released in late April 2007 and updated for typos in May 2007.
- eGRID2000 Version 1.0 was released in December 2002; Version 2.0 was released in April 2003; and Version 2.01 was released in May 2003. (eGRID2000 replaced eGRID versions 1996 through 1998).
- eGRID1998 was released in March and September 2001.
- eGRID1997 was released in December 1999.
- eGRID1996 was first released in December 1998.

== Data summary ==
eGRID data include emissions, different types of emission rates, electricity generation, resource mix, and heat input. eGRID data also include plant identification, location, and structural information. The emissions information in eGRID include carbon dioxide (CO_{2}), nitrogen oxides (NO_{x}), sulfur dioxide (SO_{2}), mercury (Hg), methane (CH_{4}), nitrous oxide (N_{2}O), and carbon dioxide equivalent (CO_{2}e). CO_{2}, CH_{4}, and N_{2}O are greenhouse gases (GHG) that contribute to global warming or climate change. NO_{x} and SO_{2} contribute to unhealthy air quality and acid rain in many parts of the country. eGRID's resource mix information includes the following fossil fuel resources: coal, oil, gas, other fossil; nuclear resources; and the following renewable resources: hydroelectric (water), biomass (including biogas, landfill gas and digester gas), wind, solar, and geothermal.

eGRID data is presented as an Excel workbook with data worksheets and a table of contents. The eGRID workbook contains data at the unit, generator, and plant levels and aggregated data by state, power control area, eGRID subregion, NERC region, and U.S. The workbook also includes a worksheet that displays the grid gross loss (%). Beginning with eGRID2023, R programming language was used to develop eGRID. EPA has made the R scripts available for users to view and use. The R scripts can be found on GitHub. There is a readme available in the repository to assist users in understanding the necessary scripts and documentation in creating eGRID.

Additional documentation is also provided with each eGRID release such as, a Technical Guide (PDF), Summary Tables, eGRID subregion map (JPG), NERC region Map (JPG), and release notes (TXT). These files are available as separate downloadable files or all of them are contained in a ZIP file. Similar files can be downloaded for a given year's eGRID release from EPA's eGRID website.

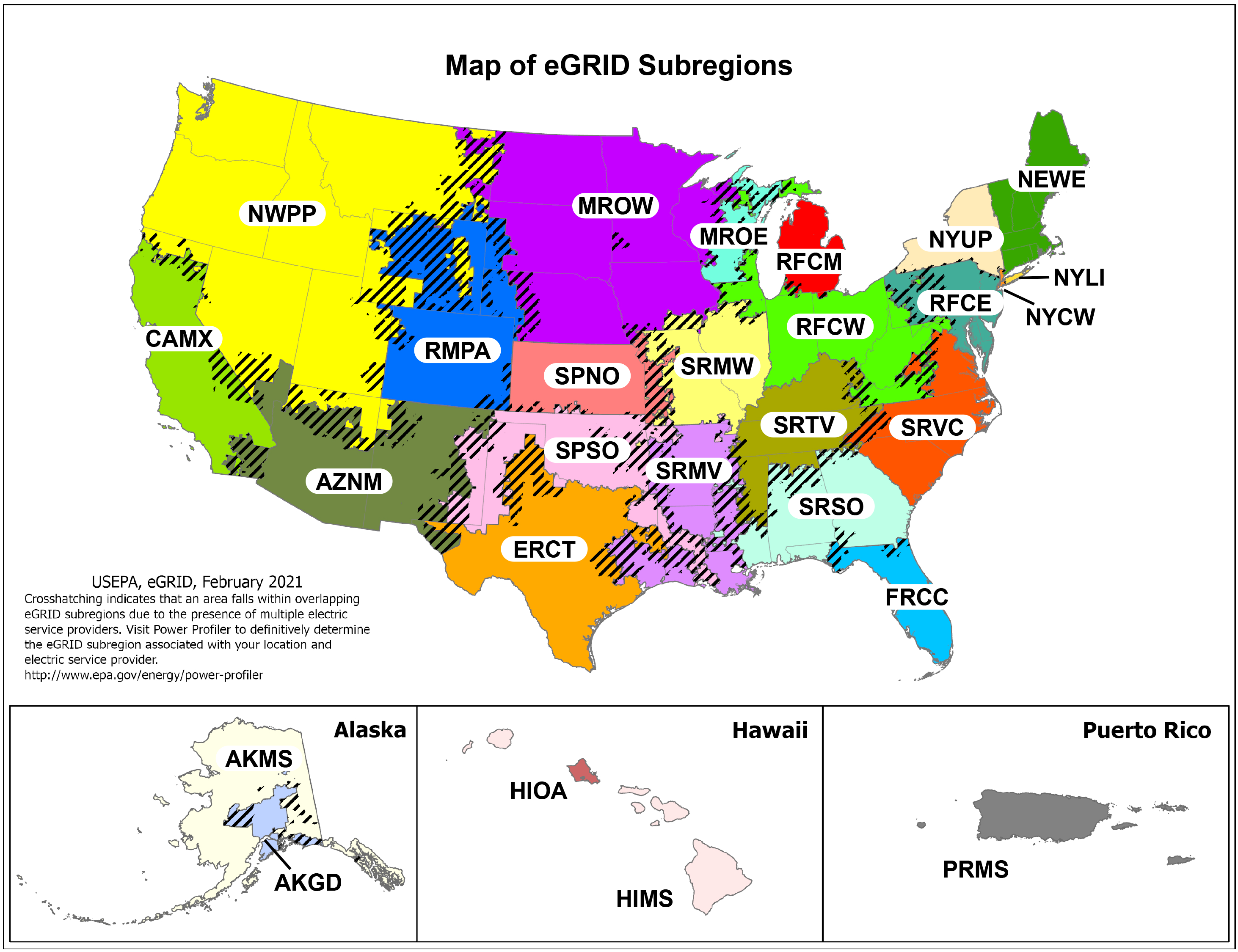
eGRID Subregions, 2019

The primary data sources used for eGRID include data reported by electric generators to EPA’s Clean Air Markets Division (pursuant to 40 CFR Part 75) and to the U.S. Energy Information Administration (EIA).

== Data use ==
eGRID data are used for carbon footprinting; emission reduction calculations; calculating indirect greenhouse gas emissions for The Climate Registry, the California Climate Action Registry, California's Mandatory GHG emissions reporting program (Global Warming Solutions Act of 2006, AB 32), and other GHG protocols; were used as the starting point for the new international carbon emissions database, CARMA. EPA tools and programs such as Power Profiler, Portfolio Manager, the WasteWise Office Carbon Footprint Tool, the Green Power Equivalency Calculator, the Personal Greenhouse Gas Emissions Calculator, and the Greenhouse Gas Equivalencies Calculator use eGRID. Other tools such as labeling/environmental disclosure, Renewable Portfolio Standards (RPS) and Renewable Energy Credits (RECs) attributes are supported by eGRID data. States also rely on eGRID data for electricity labeling (environmental disclosure programs), emissions inventories, and for policy decisions such as output based standards. eGRID is additionally used by nongovernmental organizations for tools and analysis by the International Council for Local Environmental Initiatives (ICLEI), the Northeast States for Coordinated Air Use Management (NESCAUM), the Rocky Mountain Institute, the National Resource Defense Council (NRDC), the Ozone Transport Commission (OTC), Powerscorecard.org, and the Greenhouse Gas Protocol Initiative.

In 2010, Executive Order 13514 was issued, requiring Federal agencies to “measure, report, and reduce their greenhouse gas emissions from direct and indirect activities.” The Federal GHG Accounting and Reporting Guidance accompanied this order and recommended using eGRID non-baseload emission rates to estimate the Scope 2 (indirect) emission reductions from renewable energy.

== See also ==
- Air pollution
- Combined Heat and Power (CHP)
- Combined cycle
- Electric power
- Electric utility
- Electrical power industry
- Electricity generation
- External combustion engine
- Gas turbine
- Power station
- Renewable energy
- Steam turbine
