= National Grid =

National Grid or National grid may refer to:

== Power transmission ==
- Electrical grid, an interconnected network for delivering electricity
  - National Grid (Great Britain), the electricity transmission network of Great Britain
    - National Grid plc, a utilities company based in the UK that also operates in the northeastern United States
  - National Grid (India), the electricity transmission network of India
  - National Grid (Malaysia), the electricity transmission network of Malaysia
  - National Grid (New Zealand), the electricity transmission network of New Zealand

== Geosurvey ==
- National grid reference system, a national geographical coordinate system for mapping
  - Ordnance Survey National Grid, used in Great Britain
  - Irish national grid reference system
  - United States National Grid

== Other uses ==
- National Grid for Learning, a former government funded educational program in the UK

== See also ==
- Power Grid Corporation of India
- State Grid Corporation of China
