= Robert Hammond (electrical engineer) =

English electrical engineer

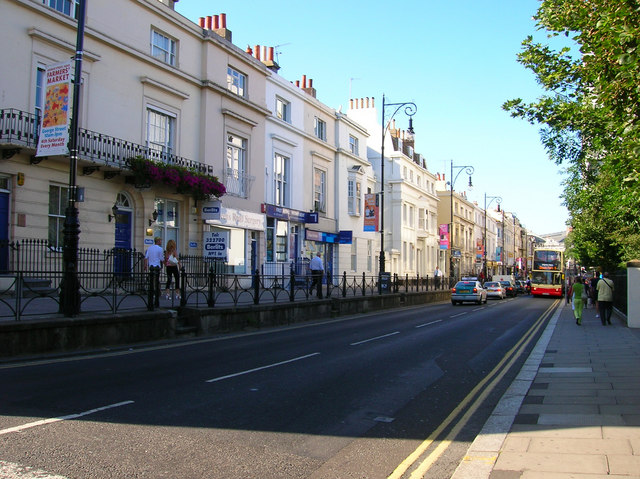
Queen's Road Brighton, showing street lights

Robert Hammond (19 January 1850, Waltham Cross – 5 August 1915, Hampstead) was an English electrical engineer who pioneered electric lighting and the generation and distribution of electrical power for lighting and other purposes.

Following the demonstration of a Charles F. Brush's arc lamp lighting system in Brighton in 1881, Hammond established the Hammond Electric Light and Power Company which supplied electricity to enable shopkeepers located in Queen’s Road, Brighton and Western Road to install electric lighting in their premises.
