= Nowruzabad =

Nowruzabad (Persian: نوروزاباد), also rendered as Noruzabad, may refer to any of a number of settlements in Iran:

== East Azerbaijan Province ==
- Nowruzabad, East Azerbaijan, a village in Meyaneh County

== Fars Province ==
- Nowruzabad, Fars, a village in Kazerun County
- Nowruzabad, Shiraz, a village in Shiraz County

== Gilan Province ==
- Nowruzabad, Gilan, a village in Siahkal County

== Kermanshah Province ==
- Nowruzabad, Kermanshah, a village in Kermanshah County
- Nowruzabad, Kuzaran, a village in Kermanshah County

== Lorestan Province ==
- Nowruzabad, Mirbag-e Shomali, a village in Mirbag-e Shomali Rural District, Central District, Delfan County
- Nowruzabad, Nurali, a village in Nurali Rural District, Central District, Delfan County

== Qazvin Province ==
- Nowruzabad, Qazvin, a village in Qazvin County

== Razavi Khorasan Province ==
- Nowruzabad, Chenaran, a village in the Central District of Chenaran County
- Nowruzabad, Golbajar, a village in Golbajar District, Chenaran County
- Nowruzabad, Nishapur, a village Nishapur County
- Nowruzabad, Sarakhs, a village Sarakhs County

== West Azerbaijan Province ==
- Nowruzabad, West Azerbaijan, a village in Shahin Dezh County

== Zanjan Province ==
- Nowruzabad, Zanjan, a village in Zanjan County

== See also ==
- Nowruz (disambiguation)
- Nowrozabad, in India
  - Nowrozabad railway station
