= Nowruz (disambiguation) =

Nowruz is the celebration of the Persian new year.

Nowruz or Navruz may also refer to:

- Nowruz (name), a list of people and a figure in folklore with the given name or surname
- Nowruz (oil field), an Iranian oil field in the Persian Gulf
- Nowruz (magazine), a Persian-language magazine published between 1903 and 1904
- Navruz Cup, international football tournament in Uzbekistan
- Navruz Jurakobilov, Uzbekistani judoka
- Nawrūz (Mongol emir), 13th century Mongol Naib of Ilkhanate and Ilkhanate emir of Khorasan
- Nawruz Ahmad (Baraq Khan), Khan of the Uzbek Khanate
- Nawruz Beg, Khan of the Golden Horde in 1360

== See also ==
- Navroʻz, an urban-type settlement in Uzbekistan
- Newroz (disambiguation)
- Deh-e Nowruz (disambiguation)
- Nowruzi (disambiguation)
- Naoroji (disambiguation)
- Navroz Dubash, Indian climate-change scientist
- Navroze Godrej, Indian businessman
- Navrozashvili, Georgian surname derived from the word Nowruz
- Nowruzabad (disambiguation)
- Nowrozabad, city in Madhya Pradesh, India
  - Nowrozabad railway station
