= Niklas Höhne =

German researcher (born 1970)

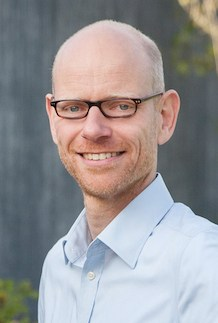
- Höhne
- Born: October 1970; Hamburg, Germany
- Education: RWTH Aachen University; INSA Lyon; University of Utrecht
- Known for: Climate policy
- Scientific career
- Fields: Climate change mitigation
- Workplaces: UNFCCC; NewClimate Institute; Wageningen University
- Doctoral advisor: Kornelis Blok

Niklas Höhne (born October 1970) is a German scientist in the field of national and international climate policy and mitigation of greenhouse gas emissions. He is founder of the NewClimate Institute in Cologne, Germany, and professor at Wageningen University.

== Career ==
Höhne attended RWTH Aachen University with a one-year scholarship at INSA Lyon and received his Diplom degree in physics in 1997. From 1998 to 2001 he worked as a staff member at the UNFCCC secretariat. In 2001, he joined Ecofys, a leading climate and energy consultancy. In 2005, he received his PhD from the Department of Science, Technology, and Society, University of Utrecht, The Netherlands, for the dissertation on "What is next after the Kyoto Protocol – Assessment of options for international climate policy post 2012″. In 2009, he became Director of Energy and Climate Policy at Ecofys. Together with colleagues he founded in 2014 the NewClimate Institute, a non-profit research organization for climate policy. In 2017, he was appointed Special Professor "Mitigation of Greenhouse Gas Emissions" at Wageningen University.

== Research ==
Already in his Diplom thesis "Photothermal deflection spectroscopy as a method to characterize solar cells based on amorphous silicon" Höhne was devoted to the promotion of renewable energy. As programme officer at the UNFCCC secretariat from 1998 on he supported the negotiations on reporting under the Kyoto Protocol, projections of greenhouse gas emissions, fluorinated greenhouse gases and emissions from international transport. Höhne led studies related to the international climate change negotiations and national climate policies.

Höhne contributes to reports of the Intergovernmental Panel on Climate Change (IPCC) since 2003. He is author of the chapter on climate policies and international cooperation in the Fourth and Fifth Assessment Report and contributing author for the Sixth Assessment Report of the IPCC. The IPCC with its authors received the Nobel Peace Prize in 2007. He is also lead author of all UNEP Emissions Gap reports since 2010. He created the Climate Action Tracker in 2009 that tracks commitments and actions of countries on climate change.

His work with the Climate Action Tracker, the UNEP emissions gap reports and in publications in Nature significantly contributed to the understanding that all national climate targets taken together are not yet compatible with the long-term temperature goal of the Paris Agreement.

Höhne, Farhana Yamin and Erik Haites were the first to propose in 2013 a global goal for a future international climate agreement to phase out greenhouse gas emissions entirely. This idea was eventually included in the Paris Agreement adopted in 2015 as "to achieve a balance between anthropogenic emissions by sources and removals by sinks of greenhouse gases in the second half of this century", the so-called net zero emissions goal. Accordingly, many countries set themselves national net zero emissions goals. Höhne and colleagues were the first to find that the full implementation of this wave of national net zero goals would bring the long-term temperature goal of the Paris Agreement within reach.

He and colleagues broke down the challenge of net-zero global greenhouse gas emissions into actionable sectoral benchmarks. For example, in 2016, they argued that this would mean the end of sales of cars with internal combustion engines by 2035. In 2021, the IEA (International Energy Agency) picked up this goal. Finally in 2022, the EU adopted this date in their regulation on CO_{2} emissions from cars and vans.

His PhD thesis work of 2005 on sharing the effort of reducing greenhouse gas emissions between countries contains the statement that developed countries would need to reduce greenhouse gas emissions by 25% to 40% in 2020 compared to 1990 and 80% to 95% by 2050 to be compatible with limiting global temperature increase to 2 °C. These values were picked up in the IPCC Fourth Assessment Report and became the internationally agreed standard for the required reductions by developed countries at that time and inspired many national greenhouse gas emission reduction targets, e.g. Norway, Japan, German, EU, Korea, Mexico, US.

== Selected publications ==
- Kuramochi, T.; Höhne, N.; Schaeffer, M.; Cantzler, J.; Hare, B.; Deng, Y.; Sterl, S.; Hagemann, M.; Rocha, M.; Yanguas-Parra, P.A.; Mir, G.-U.-R.; Wong, L.; El-Laboudy, T.; Wouters, K.; Deryng, D.; Blok, K. (2018). "Ten key short-term sectoral benchmarks to limit warming to 1.5 °C". Clim. Policy. 18 (3): 287–305. Bibcode:2018CliPo..18..287K. doi:10.1080/14693062.2017.1397495. S2CID 158468991.
- NewClimate Institute, Germanwatch, Allianz SE, 2018. Allianz Climate and Energy Monitor 2018.
- Rogelj, J; den Elzen, M; Höhne, N; Fransen, T; Fekete, H; Winkler, H; et al. (2016). "Paris Agreement climate proposals need a boost to keep warming well below 2 °C" (PDF). Nature. 534 (7609): 631–639. Bibcode:2016Natur.534..631R. doi:10.1038/nature18307. PMID 27357792. S2CID 205249514.
- UNEP, 2017. The Emissions Gap Report 2017. United Nations Environment Programme (UNEP), Nairobi, Kenya. ISBN 978-92-9253-062-4
- Höhne, N.; den Elzen, M.G.J.; Escalante, D. (2014). "Regional GHG reduction targets based on effort sharing: a comparison of studies". Climate Policy. 14 (1): 122–147. Bibcode:2014CliPo..14..122H. doi:10.1080/14693062.2014.849452. S2CID 154815226.
- Stavins, R.N., Zou, J., Brewer, T., Grand, M.C., Elzen, M. den, Finus, M., Gupta, J., Höhne, N., Lee, M.-K., Michaelowa, A., Paterson, M., Ramakrishna, K., Wen, G., Wiener, J., Winkler, H., 2014. Chapter 13: International Cooperation: Agreements & Instruments, Climate Change 2014: Mitigation of Climate Change. Contribution of Working Group III to the Fifth Assessment Report of the Intergovernmental Panel on Climate Change.
- Dubash, N.K.; Hagemann, M.; Höhne, N.; Upadhyaya, P. (2013). "Developments in national climate change mitigation legislation and strategy". Climate Policy. 13 (6): 649–664. Bibcode:2013CliPo..13..649D. doi:10.1080/14693062.2013.845409. S2CID 154979624.
- Höhne, N.; Blum, H.; Fuglestvedt, J.; Skeie, R.B.; Kurosawa, A.; Hu, G.; Lowe, J.; Gohar, L.; Matthews, B.; Nioac de Salles, A.C.; Ellermann, C. (2011). "Contributions of individual countries' emissions to climate change and their uncertainty". Climatic Change. 106 (3): 359–391. Bibcode:2011ClCh..106..359H. doi:10.1007/s10584-010-9930-6. S2CID 59149563.
- den Elzen, M.G. J.; Höhne, N. (2010). "Sharing the reduction effort to limit global warming to 2 °C". Climate Policy. 10 (3): 247–260. Bibcode:2010CliPo..10..247D. doi:10.3763/cpol.2009.0678a. S2CID 152964846.
- Rogelj, J.; Nabel, J.; Chen, C.; Hare, W.; Markmann, K.; Meinshausen, M.; Schaeffer, M.; Macey, K.; Höhne, N. (2010). "Copenhagen Accord pledges are paltry". Nature. 464 (7292): 1126–1128. Bibcode:2010Natur.464.1126R. doi:10.1038/4641126a. PMID 20414291. S2CID 4359678.
- den Elzen, M.G.J.; Höhne, N. (2008). "Reductions of greenhouse gas emissions in Annex I and non-Annex I countries for meeting concentration stabilisation targets. An editorial comment". Climatic Change. 91: 249–274. Bibcode:2008ClCh...91..249D. doi:10.1007/s10584-008-9484-z.
- Gupta, S., Tirpak, D., Burger, N., Gupta, J., Höhne, N., Boncheva, A.I., Kanoan, G.M., Kolstad, C., Kruger, J.A., Michaelowa, A., Murase, S., Pershing, J., Saijo, T., Sari, A., 2007. Policies, Instruments and Co-operative Arrangements, Climate Change 2007: Mitigation. Contribution of Working Group III to the Fourth Assessment Report of the Intergovernmental Panel on Climate Change. Cambridge University Press, Cambridge, UK, and New York, NY.
- Höhne, N.; den Elzen, M.G.J.; Weiss, M. (2006). "Common but differentiated convergence (CDC): a new conceptual approach to long-term climate policy". Climate Policy. 6 (2): 181–199. doi:10.3763/cpol.2006.0610.
- Höhne, N., 2005. What is next after the Kyoto Protocol? Assessment of options for international climate policy post 2012. PhD thesis, University of Utrecht, Utrecht, The Netherlands. ISBN 90-739-5893-8, Revised version published in 2006 at Techne Press, Amsterdam as ISBN 90-8594-005-2.
- Höhne, Niklas; den Elzen, Michel; Rogelj, Joeri; Metz, Bert; Fransen, Taryn; Kuramochi, Takeshi; Olhoff, Anne; Alcamo, Joseph; Winkler, Harald; Fu, Sha; Schaeffer, Michiel; Schaeffer, Roberto; Peters, Glen P.; Maxwell, Simon; Dubash, Navroz K. (4 March 2020). "Emissions: world has four times the work or one-third of the time" (PDF). Nature. 579 (7797). Springer Science and Business Media LLC: 25–28. Bibcode:2020Natur.579...25H. doi:10.1038/d41586-020-00571-x. ISSN 0028-0836. PMID 32132686. S2CID 212408092.
