= Naoroji =

Naoroji may refer to:

- Dadabhai Naoroji (1825-1917), Parsi intellectual, educator, cotton trader
  - Dadabhai Naoroji Road, road in Mumbai, India
- Naoroji Furdunji (1817–1885), Parsi reformer from Bombay
- Naroji Pirojaha Godrej (1916-1990), Indian businessman
- Nowroji Saklatwala (1875–1938), Indian businessman, third chairman of the Tata Group
- Navroji Mistri (1885–1953), Indian entrepreneur and philanthropist
- Jamshyd Naoroji Godrej (born 1949), Indian industrialist
- Rishad Naoroji (born 1951), Indian billionaire environmentalist
- Prenolepis naoroji, species of ant in the subfamily Formicinae
- Nowroji Road, road in Visakhapatnam, India

== See also ==
- Norouzi, an Iranian surname
- Nowruzi (disambiguation)
- Nowruz (disambiguation)
