= Nowruzan =

Nowruzan or Nauruzan (Persian: نوروزان) may refer to:

- Nowruzan, Kavar
- Nowruzan, Shiraz
