= 2 degree climate target =

International climate policy goal

This figure depicts the rates at which global CO_{2} emissions must decline after 2024 to limit the global temperature increase to 1.5, 1.7, or 2.0 degrees Celsius without relying on net-negative emissions.

Evolution of land and sea temperatures 1880–2020 compared to the 1951–1980 average

The two degree target is the international climate policy goal of limiting global warming to less than two degrees Celsius (3.6 degrees Fahrenheit) compared to pre-industrialization levels (1850–1900). It is an integral part of the Paris climate agreement. This objective is a political determination based on scientific knowledge concerning the probable consequences of global warming, which dates from the Copenhagen Conference in 2009. Physical climate risk scenarios, which often project to the end of the century, 2100, use the 2 °C target as a reference point. The time at which global mean temperature is predicted to reach +2 °C compared to the pre-industrial period (1850–1900) is termed the "crossing year".

As a global target for limiting emissions, the 2 °C target has frequently been criticized for being higher than desirable, because two degrees of warming will have serious consequences for humans and the environment. The IPCC Special Report on Global Warming of 1.5 °C (2018) included detailed analysis of the probable differences in impact of "limiting global warming to 1.5 °C compared with 2 °C", warning that a 2 °C temperature increase would worsen impacts that include extreme weather, Arctic sea ice decline, rising sea levels, coral bleaching, and ecosystem loss.

The impact of climate change is not uniform: for example, land regions tend to warm faster than ocean regions. NASA has modeled predicted changes in six key climate variables: air temperature, precipitation, relative humidity, wind speed, and short- and longwave solar radiation, with particular attention to their impacts on heat stress and fire weather. NASA's NEX-GDDP-CMIP6 data set models impact at a fine-grained spatial scale, which can be used to identify key risk areas and develop adaptation and mitigation action plans for specific regions. Above the 2 °C threshold, dangerous and cascading effects are predicted to occur, with many areas experiencing simultaneous multiple impacts due to climate change.

As of 2022, the UN Environment Programme reported that countries have not met their climate goals to date. As a result the UN Framework Convention on Climate Change predicts a likely increase between 2.1 and 2.9 °C in temperature by 2100, exceeding the 2 °C climate target. Some scientists suggest that the development of decarbonization technologies may offer a way to reverse the accumulation of CO_{2} in the atmosphere. Even if temperatures increase above 2 °C, it may become possible to halt or reverse increases by late in the century and bring CO_{2} levels back to the levels identified by the Paris climate agreement. This type of scenario is referred to as an "overshoot pathway". Achieving such an outcome will require multigenerational management over many decades.

== See also ==
- Anthropocene
- Climate target
- Keeling Curve
- Eco-sufficiency
