= NewClimate Institute =

The NewClimate Institute is a German nonprofit focused on producing research related to climate change and other sustainability topics. It was founded by Niklas Höhne. The organization showed 6 million Euros in funding as for 2024.

Notable projects include the Climate Action Tracker, Climate Change Performance Index, Corporate Climate Responsibility Monitor and the Net Zero Tracker. They are heavily cited in academic reviews; and their trackers have described them as accurate and useful for tracking progress against the international climate goals, and they have been used in IPCC reports such as Chapter 13 of the WGIII 6th Assessment report.

== Climate action tracker ==
Climate Action Tracker (CAT) is an independent scientific project with the aim of monitoring government action to achieve their reduction of greenhouse gas emissions with regard to international agreements – specifically the globally agreed Paris Agreement aim of "holding warming well below 2°C, and pursuing efforts to limit warming to 1.5°C". It is tracking climate action in 39 countries and the European Union responsible for over 85% of global emissions. Climate Action Tracker is the product of two organisations: NewClimate Institute and Climate Analytics .

The actions it tracks are: - Effect of climate policies and action on emissions. - Impact of pledges, targets and nationally determined contributions on national emissions over the time period to 2030, and where possible beyond. - Comparability of effort against countries' fair share and modelled domestic pathways.

== Climate Change Performance Index ==
2023 Climate Change Performance Index

The Climate Change Performance Index (CCPI) is a scoring system designed by the German environmental and development organisation Germanwatch e.V. to enhance transparency in international climate politics. On the basis of standardised criteria, the index evaluates and compares the climate protection performance of 63 countries and the European Union (EU) (status CCPI 2022), which are together responsible for more than 90% of global greenhouse gas (GHG) emissions.

The CCPI was first published in 2005 and an updated version is presented at the UN Climate Change Conference annually. Germanwatch publishes the index in cooperation with the NewClimate Institute and Climate Action Network International and with financial support from Barthel Foundation. The most important results are available in German, English, French and Spanish.
