= Newroz (disambiguation) =

Newroz (نەورۆز) is a prominent holiday in the Kurdish calendar.

Nawroz or Newruz may also refer to:

== People ==
- Newroz Uysal Aslan, Turkish lawyer and politician
- Newroz Dogan, Danish footballer
- Nawroz Mangal, Afghan former cricketer

== Sport ==
- Newroz SC, a Kurdish football team based in Sulaymaniyah
- Newroz International Stadium, Newroz SC Official Stadium

== Other uses ==
- Nawroz University, a university in Duhok, Iraq
- Newroz (song), single song by Hassan Zirak

== See also ==
- Nowruz (disambiguation)
