= Germanwatch =

Voluntary association

- Formation: 1991 (35 years ago)
- Type: non-profit, non-governmental organization
- Location(s): Bonn and Berlin, Germany
- Website: germanwatch.org/en

Germanwatch e.V. is a non-profit, non-governmental organization based in Bonn, Germany. It seeks to influence public policy on trade, the environment, and relations between countries in the industrialized north and underdeveloped south. The organization collates a variety of economic and social data to formulate position papers, often in partnership with other NGOs. Particular areas of interest include trade in food and agricultural policy, climate change, and corporate accountability.

Germanwatch was founded 1991 by Christoph Bals.

== Climate Change Performance Index ==
The Climate Change Performance Index (CCPI) is an annual publication by Germanwatch, the NewClimate Institute, and Climate Action Network International. It evaluates the climate protection performance of 63 countries and the EU, which are together responsible for over 90% of global greenhouse gas emissions.

Since the CCPI 2018, the CCPI takes into account greenhouse gas emissions (40%), renewable energy (20%), energy use (20%), and climate policy (20%). The climate policy evaluation is unique for the CCPI and consults around 400 experts regarding national and international climate policy performance.

In the most recent CCPI 2019, no country has performed well enough to reach one of the top three places. The fourth rank is occupied by Sweden.

== Global Climate Risk Index ==
Germanwatch also publishes the Global Climate Risk Index. The annually published Global Climate Risk Index analyses to what extent countries have been affected by the impacts of weather-related loss events. The index takes into account lives lost and financial costs incurred due to such events. Slow onset climate risks like rising sea levels and melting glaciers, which occur incrementally and over a long period are not factored in by the index.

== Events ==
On 9 November 2016, Lutz Weischer of Germanwatch told Deutsche Welle, following the election of Donald Trump as US president, that "Germany's climate and energy policy stances are highly influential globally, and now must be strengthened".
