= Nowruz (name) =

Nowruz or spelling variations thereof may refer to the following:

== Given name ==
- Nawrūz (Mongol emir) (died 1297), emir of the Ilkhanid era
- Nawruz Beg (died 1361), Khan of the Blue Horde
- Nowruz Beg (died 1640), Safavid official
- Navroz Dubash, 21st century Indian climatologist
- Navroze Godrej, 21st century Indian business executive
- Navruz Jurakobilov (born 1984), Uzbek judoka
- Nawroz Mangal (born 1984), Afghanistan cricketer

== Surname ==
- Alp Navruz (born 1990), Turkish actor and model
- Amu Nowruz, a figure in Iranian folklore associated with the Nowruz festival
