= Deh-e Nowruz =

Deh-e Nowruz (Persian: ده نوروز) may refer to:

- Deh-e Nowruz, Kerman
- Deh-e Nowruz, Khuzestan
- Deh-e Nowruz, Lorestan
