= Nowruzi =

Nowruzi (Persian: نوروزي) may refer to:

- Norouzi, an Iranian surname
- Nowruzi, Khoshab, Razavi Khorasan Province
- Nowruzi, Quchan, Razavi Khorasan Province
- Nowruzi Mosaic Blocks, Khuzestan Province

== See also ==
- Naoroji (disambiguation)
- Nowruz (disambiguation)
