= Climate target =

Policy for emissions reductions

States by intended year of climate neutrality: Already climate neutral or positive (Note: Climate positive is synonymous to carbon negative but includes greenhouse gases other than carbon dioxide.) 2030 2035 2040 2045 2050 2053 2060 2070 Unknown or undeclared

This figure depicts the rates at which global CO_{2} emissions must decline after 2024 to limit the global temperature increase to 1.5, 1.7, or 2.0 degrees Celsius without relying on net-negative emissions.

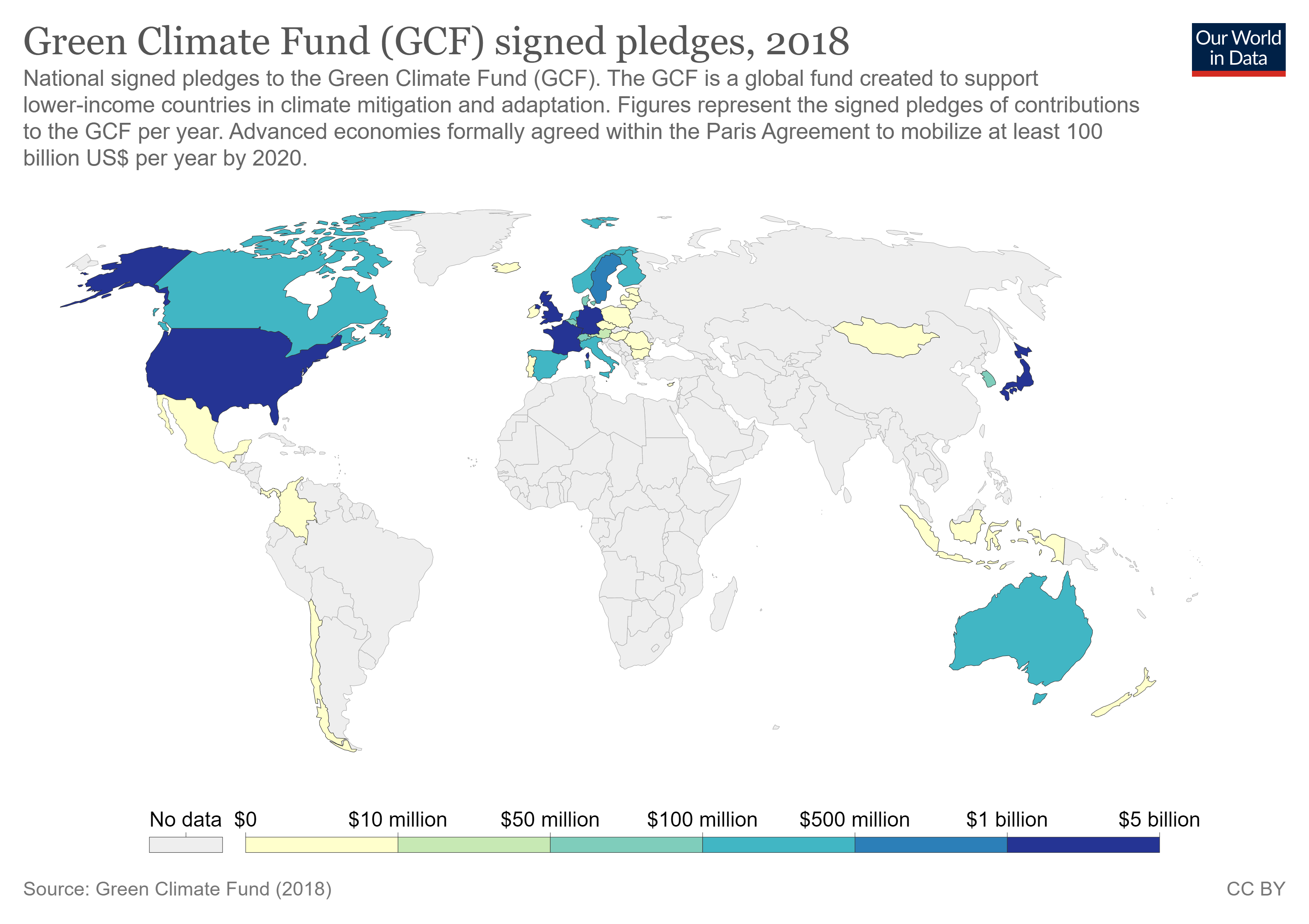
World map for Sustainable Development Goal 13 Indicator 13.A.1: Green Climate Fund mobilization of $100 billion, 2018.

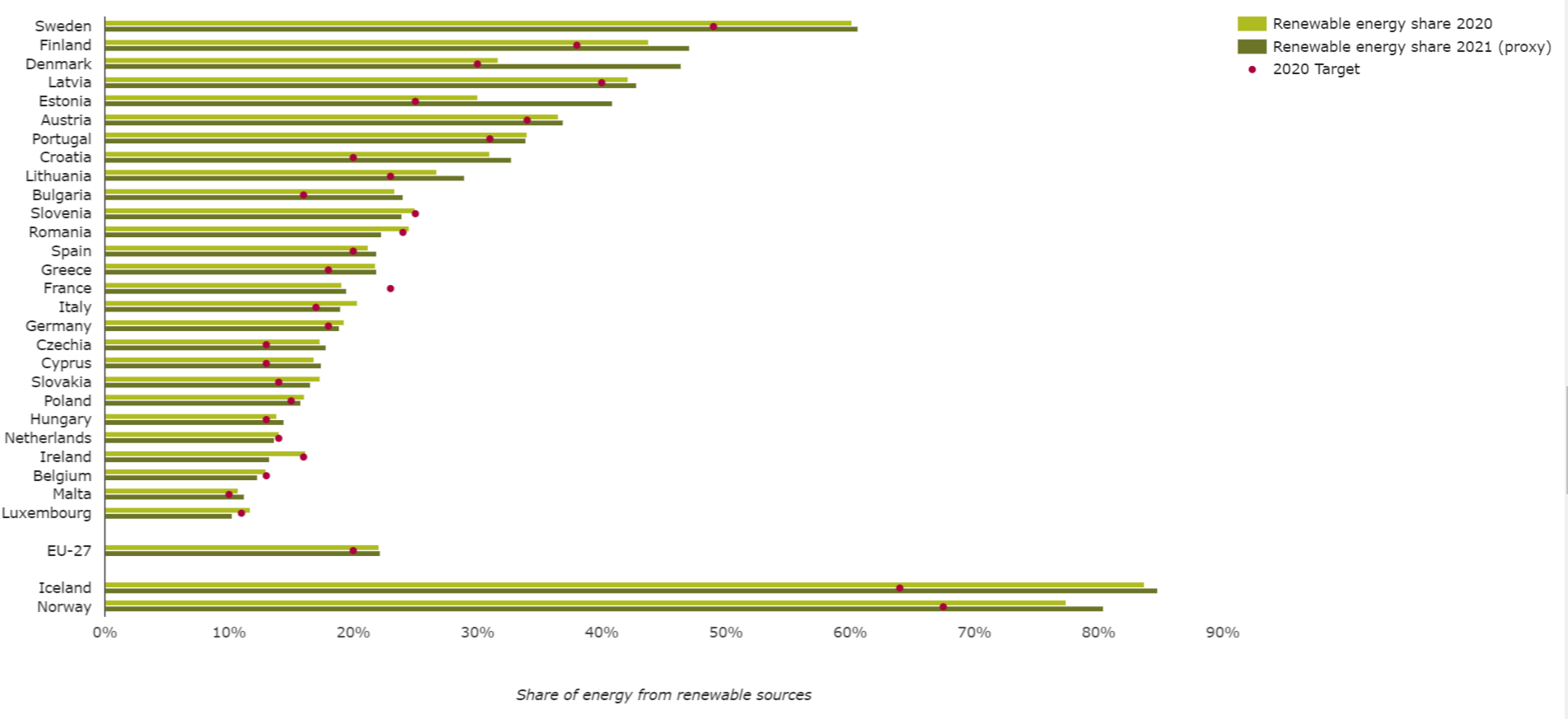
Share of energy consumption from renewable sources for EU and EEA countries 2020 and 2021, compared to the national targets for 2020. EU28 (including United Kingdom) pledged an average of 20 percent renewable energy for 2020, and EU27 reached 22 percent.

A climate target, climate goal or climate pledge is a measurable long-term commitment for climate policy and energy policy with the aim of limiting the climate change. Researchers within, among others, the UN climate panel have identified probable consequences of global warming for people and nature at different levels of warming. Based on this, politicians in a large number of countries have agreed on temperature targets for warming, which is the basis for scientifically calculated carbon budgets and ways to achieve these targets. This in turn forms the basis for politically decided global and national emission targets for greenhouse gases, targets for fossil-free energy production and efficient energy use, and for the extent of planned measures for climate change mitigation and adaptation.

At least 164 countries have implemented climate targets in their national climate legislation.

== Global climate targets ==
Countries' targets for when new sales of fossil fuel vehicles should be prohibited: 2020s 2030s 2040s 2050s

Number of parties in multilateral environmental agreements

Global climate targets are goals that a large number of countries have agreed upon, including at United Nations Climate Change conferences (COP). Targets often referred to are:

- The Climate Convention – an international environmental treaty adopted at the Rio Conference in Brazil in 1992.
- Targets for 2008 to 2012: In the Kyoto Protocol of 1997, 160 countries committed to reducing their greenhouse gas emissions by an average of 5.2 percent over the period 2008 to 2012 compared to 1990 levels.
- Targets for 2013 to 2020: In the Doha amendment to the Kyoto Protocol, slightly fewer I countries committed to reducing their emissions by at least 18 percent in the period 2013 to 2020 compared to 1990.
- Targets for 2030:
  - 105 countries promised deforestation at the COP26 in 2021 to end deforestation to 2030.
  - 105 countries signed in connection with COP26 and COP27 a pledge to reduce methane emissions by 30 percent by 2030 compared to 2020.
- Targets for 2100:
  - United Nations Climate Change Conference 2009 proposed a 2 degree climate target for global warming until the year 2100.
  - The Paris Agreement (United Nations Climate Change Agreement) of 2015 with countries' non-binding climate pledges, formally known as NDCs, and before the agreement's ratification for INDCs (Intended Nationally Determined Contributions), to keep global warming well below the 2-degree target by 2100, and that further efforts should be made towards a 1.5-degree target.
- Goal number 13 in the global goals for sustainable development within the Agenda 2030 deals with climate action, and was decided by the UN General Assembly in 2015. Among other things, it includes the UN Green Climate Fund.

== Climate targets by country ==
=== South Korea ===
The Republic of Korea regularly submits its Nationally Determined Contributions (NDCs) under the Paris Agreement, setting mid- and long-term greenhouse gas (GHG) reduction targets and carbon neutrality goals. Korea’s climate targets are discussed across various dimensions, including participation in international climate negotiations, domestic legislation and institutional reforms, and international assessments.

- 2030 National Greenhouse Gas Reduction Target (NDC)

When the Paris Agreement was adopted in 2015, South Korea submitted a target to reduce its Greenhouse gas emissions by 37% from the business-as-usual (BAU) level by 2030. In December 2020, the government submitted an updated NDC to the United Nations Framework Convention on Climate Change (UNFCCC). In October 2021, under the Moon Jae-in administration, the NDC target was raised to a 40% reduction compared to 2018 emission levels. The plan includes sectoral roadmaps for energy, industry, transport, buildings, and waste, as well as management of forests and carbon sinks.

- 2050 Carbon Neutrality Goal

In October 2020, President Moon Jae-in declared in a policy address to the National Assembly that South Korea would achieve carbon neutrality by 2050. The “2050 Carbon Neutrality Scenarios,” finalized in December 2021, presented two options: a “basic scenario” (phasing out coal gradually) and an “enhanced scenario” (accelerating coal phase-out). In the same year, the Framework Act on Carbon Neutrality and Green Growth was enacted, legally defining 2050 carbon neutrality as a national long-term strategy.

- International Evaluation and Criticism

The Climate Action Tracker has rated South Korea’s 2030 target as “Insufficient.” Criticisms include the slow transition to renewable energy, continued reliance on coal-fired power generation, and uncertainty in industrial sector reduction plans. Both the OECD and the IEA have identified energy mix reform and coal phase-out as key challenges in Korea’s climate policy.

== Calculation of emissions targets ==
An emissions target or greenhouse gas emissions reduction target is a central policy instrument of international greenhouse gas emissions reduction politics and a key pillar of climate policy. They typically include heavy consideration of emissions budgets, which are calculated using rate of warming per standard emission of carbon dioxide, a historic baseline temperature, a desired level of confidence and a target global average temperature to stay below.

An "emissions target" may be distinguished from an emissions budget, as an emissions target may be internationally or nationally set in accordance with objectives other than a specific global temperature. This includes targets created for their political palatability, rather than budgets scientifically determined to meet a specific temperature target.

A country's determination of emissions targets is based on careful consideration of pledged NDCs (nationally determined contributions), economic and social feasibility, and political palatability. Carbon budgets can provide political entities with knowledge of how much carbon can be emitted before likely reaching a certain temperature threshold, but specific emissions targets take more into account. The exact way these targets are determined varies widely from country to country. Variation in emissions targets and time to complete them depends on factors such as accounting of land-use emissions, afforestation capacity of a country, and a countries transport emissions. Importantly, emissions targets also depend on their hypothesized reception.

Many emissions pathways, budgets and targets also rely on the implementation of negative emissions technology. These currently undeveloped technologies are predicted to pull net emissions down even as source emissions are not reduced.

== Effectiveness ==
Many countries' emissions targets are above the scientifically calculated allowable emissions to remain below a certain temperature threshold. In 2015, many countries pledged NDCs to limit the increase in the global average temperature to well below 2 °C above pre-industrial levels. Many of the largest emitters of GHGs, however, are on track to push global average temperature to as much as 4 °C. Some of these projections contradict agreements made in the 2015 Paris Agreement, meaning countries are not keeping to their pledged NDCs.

In addition, it is uncertain how effective many emissions targets and accompanying policies really are. For example, with countries that have high consumption-based carbon emissions, strictly enforced, aligned and coordinated international policy measures determine the effectiveness of targets. In addition, many ambitious policies are proposed and passed but are not practically enforced or regulated, or have unintended consequences. China's ETS (emissions trading scheme), while seeming to have an effect on reducing production-based emissions also promoted outsourcing of emissions contributing to a further imbalance of carbon transfer among China's different provinces. The ETS evaluation also did not account for exported consumption-based emissions.

Many countries aim to reach net zero emissions in the next few decades. In order to reach this goal however, there must be a radical shift in energy infrastructure. For example, in the United States, political entities are attempting to switch away from coal and oil based energy by replacing plants with natural gas combined cycle (NGCC) power plants. Other countries like the Netherlands were obligated by the District Court of Hague to reduce its greenhouse gas emissions by 25% by 2020. The Court has passed other innovations (Milieudefensie v. Royal Dutch Shell) to reduce dioxide emissions by 45% by 2030. However many find this transition to not be significant enough to reach net-zero emissions. More significant changes, for example using biomass energy with carbon capture and storage (BECCS) are suggested as a viable option to transition to net-zero emissions countries.

== See also ==
- Climate change in Europe#Climate targets
- Intergovernmental Panel on Climate Change
- United Nations Climate Change conference
- Nationally Determined Contributions
- Bioenergy with Carbon Capture and Storage
- Paris Agreement
- List of countries by greenhouse gas emissions per capita
