= Climate Change Performance Index =

Ranking of countries according to climate protection efforts

2023 Climate Change Performance Index

The Climate Change Performance Index (CCPI) is a scoring system designed by the German environmental and development organisation Germanwatch e.V. to enhance transparency in international climate politics. On the basis of standardised criteria, the index evaluates and compares the climate protection performance of 63 countries and the European Union (EU) (status CCPI 2022), which are together responsible for more than 90% of global greenhouse gas (GHG) emissions.

The CCPI was first published in 2005 and an updated version is presented at the UN Climate Change Conference annually. Germanwatch publishes the index in cooperation with the NewClimate Institute and Climate Action Network International and with financial support from Barthel Foundation. The most important results are available in German, English, French and Spanish.

== Methodology ==
In 2017, the underlying methodology of the CCPI was revised and adapted to the new climate policy framework of the Paris Agreement from 2015. The CCPI was extended in order to include the measurement of a country’s progress towards the Nationally Determined Contributions (NDCs) and the country’s 2030 targets. The national performances are assessed based on 14 indicators in the following four categories:

1. GHG emissions (weighting 40%)
2. Renewable energy (weighting 20%)
3. Energy use (weighting 20%)
4. Climate policy (weighting 20%)

The three categories "GHG emissions", "renewable energy" and "energy use" are each defined by four equally weighted indicators: (1) current level, (2) recent developments (5-year trend), (3) 2 °C compatibility of the current performance, and (4) 2 °C compatibility of 2030 target. These 12 indicators are complemented by two indicators, measuring the country's performance regarding its national climate policy framework and implementation as well as regarding international climate diplomacy in the category "climate policy". The data for the "climate policy" category is assessed annually in a comprehensive research study. Its basis is the performance rating by climate change experts from non-governmental organisations, universities and think tanks within the countries that are evaluated. In a questionnaire, the respondents give a rating on the most important measures of their governments. The results are rated as very high, high, medium, low, or very low.

== Results ==
The most recent results illustrate the main regional differences in climate protection efforts and performance within 63 evaluated countries and the EU. The CCPI has not evaluated the performance of Ukraine since the 2023 index due to the Russian invasion of Ukraine.

In the CCPI index for 2023, Denmark led the index followed by Sweden and Chile. The last three were Iran, Saudi Arabia and Kazakhstan. In the CCPI Index for 2024, Denmark led the index followed by Estonia and the Philippines respectively. The bottom three were the UAE, Iran, and Saudi Arabia.

According to the CCPI, no country has yet achieved a performance across all indicators that can be qualified as very high, because "no country is doing enough to prevent dangerous climate change". In addition, no country has fulfilled the requirements to limit global warming to well below 2°C, as agreed in the Paris Agreement. Therefore, beginning with the CCPI index of 2009, the first three places in the final ranking have remain unoccupied, with the highest-ranked country (Denmark as of the most recent indices) placed fourth.

The following tables omit the unoccupied first three places.

=== 2026 and 2025 ===
2026 results				2025 results			
Rank	Change	Country	Score	Rank	Change	Country	Score
4	0	Denmark	80.52	4	0	Denmark	78.37
5	▲1	United Kingdom	70.80	5	▲3	Netherlands	69.60
6	▲2	Morocco	70.75	6	▲14	United Kingdom	69.29
7	▲5	Chile	70.63	7	▼ -1	Philippines	68.41
8	▲5	Luxembourg	70.45	8	▲1	Morocco	68.32
9	▲9	Lithuania	70.30	9	▲3	Norway	68.21
10	▼ -5	Netherlands	67.27	10	▼ -3	India	67.99
11	▼ -2	Norway	66.83	11	▼ -1	Sweden	67.62
12	▼ -3	Portugal	66.05	12	▼ -1	Chile	67.29
13	▼ -2	Sweden	64.91	13	▲2	Luxembourg	67.29
14	▲5	Spain	64.62	14	▼ -9	Estonia	66.79
15	▲16	Pakistan	64.43	15	▼ -2	Portugal	66.59
16	▲16	Romania	64.33	16	▼ -2	Germany	64.91
17	▲9	Nigeria	63.33	17	▼ -1	European Union (27)	63.76
18	▼ -4	Estonia	63.08	18	▲1	Lithuania	63.05
19	▼ -12	Philippines	62.78	19	▼ -1	Spain	61.57
20	▼ -3	European Union (27)	62.69	20	▲2	Egypt	60.52
21	▲4	France	62.42	21	▲6	Vietnam	60.04
22	▼ -6	Germany	61.51	22	▲6	Greece	59.41
23	▼ -13	India	61.31	23	▲9	Austria	59.40
24	▼ -3	Vietnam	60.65	24	▲1	Thailand	59.19
25	▲9	Malta	60.44	25	▲12	France	59.18
26	▲7	Switzerland	58.21	26	▼ -9	Nigeria	59.16
27	▲1	Brazil	58.16	27	▲4	Colombia	57.49
28	▲2	Slovenia	57.95	28	▼ -5	Brazil	57.25
29	▲8	Finland	57.62	29	▲14	Ireland	57.17
30	▼ -8	Greece	57.62	30	▲11	Slovenia	57.16
31	▲8	Mexico	57.24	31	▼ -1	Pakistan	56.85
32	▼ -8	Thailand	57.04	32	▼ -8	Romania	56.45
33	▼ -4	Ireland	56.96	33	▼ -12	Switzerland	56.10
34	▲2	Latvia	56.59	34	▼ -5	Malta	55.78
35	▼ -12	Austria	55.05	35	▲4	Belgium	54.89
36	▼ -9	Colombia	54.45	36	▼ -3	Latvia	54.35
37	▼ -2	Belgium	53.80	37	▼ -11	Finland	54.24
38	▼ -18	Egypt	53.74	38	▲7	South Africa	52.74
39	▲5	Cyprus	52.99	39	▼ -1	Mexico	52.66
40	▲11	Algeria	52.92	40	▼ -5	Croatia	51.83
41	▼ -3	South Africa	51.44	41	▼ -7	New Zealand	51.06
42	▲7	Czechia	51.12	42	▼ -6	Indonesia	50.84
43	▼ -1	Indonesia	50.84	43	▲1	Italy	49.81
44	▼ -3	New Zealand	50.71	44	▼ -2	Cyprus	49.45
45	▼ -5	Croatia	50.48	45	▲4	Hungary	48.81
46	▼ -3	Italy	50.00	46	▼ -6	Slovakia	48.44
47	▼ -1	Slovakia	49.62	47	▲8	Poland	47.86
48	▼ -3	Hungary	49.47	48	▲11	Malaysia	47.59
49	▼ -1	Malaysia	48.73	49	▲3	Czechia	47.57
50	▼ -3	Poland	48.07	50	▼ -4	Bulgaria	47.13
51	▼ -1	Bulgaria	47.26	51	▲3	Algeria	45.96
52	▲1	Turkey	44.96	52	▼ -2	Australia	45.52
53	▲1	Uzbekistan	44.49	53	▲3	Turkey	45.06
54	▲1	China	44.45	54	▼ -6	Uzbekistan	44.51
55	▲1	Belarus	43.43	55	▼ -4	China	44.15
56	▼ -4	Australia	42.49	56	▼ -9	Belarus	42.64
57	▲1	Japan	40.95	57	0	United States	40.58
58	▲1	Argentina	34.71	58	0	Japan	39.23
59	▲1	Taiwan	33.64	59	▼ -6	Argentina	35.96
60	▲1	Kazakhstan	29.38	60	▲1	Taiwan	34.87
61	▲1	Canada	28.30	61	▼ -1	Kazakhstan	33.43
62	▲3	United Arab Emirates	27.63	62	0	Canada	28.37
63	0	South Korea	23.32	63	▲1	South Korea	26.42
64	0	Russia	23.09	64	▼ -1	Russia	23.54
65	▼ -8	United States	21.84	65	0	United Arab Emirates	19.54
66	▲1	Iran	14.33	66	▲1	Saudi Arabia	18.15
67	▼ -1	Saudi Arabia	11.90	67	▼ -1	Iran	17.47

=== 2024 and 2023 ===
2024 results				2023 results			
Rank	Change	Country	Score	Rank	Change	Country	Score
4	0	Denmark	75.59	4	0	Denmark	79.61
5	▲4	Estonia	72.07	5	0	Sweden	73.28
6	▲6	Philippines	70.70	6	▲3	Chile	69.54
7	▲1	India	70.25	7	▲1	Morocco	67.44
8	▲5	Netherlands	69.98	8	▲2	India	67.35
9	▼ -2	Morocco	69.82	9	▲23	Estonia	65.14
10	▼ -5	Sweden	69.39	10	▼ -4	Norway	64.47
11	▼ -5	Chile	68.74	11	▼ -4	United Kingdom	63.07
12	▼ -2	Norway	67.48	12	▲11	Philippines	62.75
13	▲1	Portugal	67.39	13	▲6	Netherlands	62.24
14	▲2	Germany	65.77	14	▲2	Portugal	61.55
15	▲2	Luxembourg	65.09	15	▼ -1	Finland	61.24
16	▲3	European Union (27)	64.71	16	▼ -3	Germany	61.11
17	New	Nigeria	63.88	17	▲1	Luxembourg	60.76
18	▲5	Spain	63.37	18	▼ -6	Malta	60.42
19	▲2	Lithuania	62.99	19	▲3	European Union (27)	59.96
20	▼ -9	United Kingdom	62.36	20	▲1	Egypt	59.37
21	▲1	Switzerland	61.94	21	▼ -10	Lithuania	59.21
22	▼ -2	Egypt	61.80	22	▼ -7	Switzerland	58.61
23	▲15	Brazil	61.74	23	▲11	Spain	58.59
24	▲19	Romania	61.50	24	0	Greece	57.52
25	▲17	Thailand	61.38	25	▲1	Latvia	56.81
26	▼ -11	Finland	61.11	26	▲1	Indonesia	54.59
27	▲13	Vietnam	60.94	27	▼ -2	Colombia	54.50
28	▼ -4	Greece	60.34	28	▼ -11	France	52.97
29	▼ -11	Malta	59.80	29	▲1	Italy	52.90
30	New	Pakistan	59.35	30	▼ -1	Croatia	52.04
31	▼ -4	Colombia	58.68	31	▼ -3	Mexico	51.77
32	0	Austria	58.17	32	▲5	Austria	51.56
33	▼ -8	Latvia	57.68	33	▲2	New Zealand	50.55
34	▼ -1	New Zealand	57.66	34	▲6	Slovak Republic	50.12
35	▼ -5	Croatia	57.32	35	▲7	Cyprus	49.39
36	▼ -10	Indonesia	57.20	36	▲8	Bulgaria	49.15
37	▼ -9	France	57.12	37	▲9	Ireland	48.47
38	▼ -7	Mexico	55.81	38	▼ -5	Brazil	48.39
39	0	Belgium	55.00	39	▲10	Belgium	48.38
40	▼ -6	Slovak Republic	54.47	40	▲3	Vietnam	48.31
41	0	Slovenia	53.57	41	▲9	Slovenia	48.16
42	▼ -7	Cyprus	53.09	42	▼ -11	Thailand	47.23
43	▼ -6	Ireland	51.42	43	▼ -7	Romania	47.09
44	▼ -15	Italy	50.60	44	▼ -5	South Africa	45.69
45	▼ -1	South Africa	49.53	45	▲6	Czech Republic	44.16
46	▼ -10	Bulgaria	46.94	46	▲2	Belarus	43.69
47	▼ -1	Belarus	46.80	47	▼ -6	Turkey	43.32
48	New	Uzbekistan	46.68	48	▲6	Algeria	42.26
49	▲4	Hungary	45.93	49	▼ -2	Argentina	41.19
50	▲5	Australia	45.72	50	▼ -5	Japan	40.85
51	0	China	45.56	51	▼ -13	China	38.80
52	▼ -7	Czech Republic	45.41	52	▲3	United States	38.53
53	▼ -4	Argentina	45.39	53	0	Hungary	38.51
54	▼ -6	Algeria	44.54	54	▼ -2	Poland	37.94
55	▼ -1	Poland	44.40	55	▲4	Australia	36.26
56	▼ -9	Turkey	43.82	56	▲1	Malaysia	33.51
57	▼ -5	United States	42.79	57	▲1	Taiwan	28.35
58	▼ -8	Japan	42.08	58	▲3	Canada	26.47
59	▼ -3	Malaysia	38.57	59	▼ -3	Russia	25.28
60	▲1	Kazakhstan	38.52	60	0	South Korea	24.91
61	▼ -4	Taiwan	36.94	61	▲3	Kazakhstan	24.61
62	▼ -4	Canada	31.55	62	▲1	Saudi Arabia	22.41
63	▼ -4	Russia	31.00	63	▼ -1	Iran	18.77
64	▼ -4	South Korea	29.98				
65	New	United Arab Emirates	24.55				
66	▼ -3	Iran	23.53				
67	▼ -5	Saudi Arabia	19.33				

=== 2022 and 2021 ===
2022 results				2021 results		
Rank	Change	Country	Score	Rank	Country	Score
4	▲2	Denmark	76.67	4	Sweden	74.42
5	▼ -1	Sweden	74.22	5	United Kingdom	69.66
6	▲2	Norway	73.29	6	Denmark	69.42
7	▼ -2	United Kingdom	73.09	7	Morocco	67.59
8	▼ -1	Morocco	71.60	8	Norway	65.45
9	0	Chile	69.51	9	Chile	64.05
10	0	India	69.20	10	India	63.98
11	▲4	Lithuania	64.89	11	Finland	62.63
12	0	Malta	64.18	12	Malta	62.21
13	▲6	Germany	63.53	13	Latvia	61.88
14	▼ -3	Finland	62.41	14	Switzerland	60.85
15	▼ -1	Switzerland	61.70	15	Lithuania	58.03
16	▲1	Portugal	61.11	16	European Union (28)	57.29
17	▲6	France	61.01	17	Portugal	56.80
18	▲3	Luxembourg	60.80	18	Croatia	56.69
19	▲10	Netherlands	60.44	19	Germany	56.39
20	0	Ukraine	60.40	20	Ukraine	55.48
21	▲1	Egypt	59.74	21	Luxembourg	55.23
22	▼ -6	European Union (27)	59.21	22	Egypt	54.33
23	New	Philippines	58.98	23	France	53.72
24	▲10	Greece	58.22	24	Indonesia	53.59
25	New	Colombia	57.87	25	Brazil	53.26
26	▼ -13	Latvia	57.73	26	Thailand	53.18
27	▼ -3	Indonesia	57.17	27	Italy	53.05
28	▲4	Mexico	56.05	28	New Zealand	51.30
29	▼ -11	Croatia	55.96	29	Netherlands	50.96
30	▼ -3	Italy	55.39	30	Romania	50.33
31	▼ -5	Thailand	55.01	31	Slovak Republic	49.51
32	▲6	Estonia	54.98	32	Mexico	48.76
33	▼ -8	Brazil	54.86	33	China	48.18
34	▲7	Spain	54.35	34	Greece	48.11
35	▼ -7	New Zealand	54.03	35	Austria	48.09
36	▼ -6	Romania	52.43	36	Belarus	47.27
37	▼ -2	Austria	52.35	37	South Africa	46.13
38	▼ -5	China	52.20	38	Estonia	46.01
39	▼ -2	South Africa	51.13	39	Ireland	45.47
40	▼ -9	Slovak Republic	50.67	40	Belgium	45.11
41	▲1	Turkey	50.53	41	Spain	45.02
42	▲7	Cyprus	50.52	42	Turkey	43.47
43	New	Vietnam	49.21	43	Algeria	43.27
44	0	Bulgaria	48.71	44	Bulgaria	42.64
45	0	Japan	48.53	45	Japan	42.49
46	▼ -7	Ireland	47.86	46	Argentina	40.48
47	▼ -1	Argentina	47.08	47	Czech Republic	38.98
48	▼ -12	Belarus	46.66	48	Poland	38.94
49	▼ -9	Belgium	45.90	49	Cyprus	38.73
50	▲1	Slovenia	43.28	50	Hungary	38.22
51	▼ -4	Czech Republic	42.15	51	Slovenia	37.02
52	▼ -4	Poland	40.63	52	Russia	30.34
53	▼ -3	Hungary	40.41	53	South Korea	29.76
54	▼ -11	Algeria	39.91	54	Australia	28.82
55	▲6	United States	37.39	55	Kazakhstan	28.04
56	▼ -4	Russia	34.73	56	Malaysia	27.76
57	▼ -1	Malaysia	33.74	57	Taiwan	27.11
58	▼ -1	Taiwan	30.70	58	Canada	24.82
59	▼ -5	Australia	30.06	59	Iran	24.58
60	▼ -7	South Korea	26.74	60	Saudi Arabia	22.46
61	▼ -3	Canada	26.03	61	United States	19.75
62	▼ -3	Iran	25.66	62		
63	▼ -3	Saudi Arabia	24.25	63		
64	▼ -9	Kazakhstan	19.23	64		

=== 2020 and 2019 ===
2020 results			2019 results		
Rank	Country	Score	Rank	Country	Score
4	Sweden	75.77	4	Sweden	76.28
5	Denmark	71.14	5	Morocco	70.48
6	Morocco	70.63	6	Lithuania	70.47
7	United Kingdom	69.80	7	Latvia	68.31
8	Lithuania	66.22	8	United Kingdom	65.92
9	India	66.02	9	Switzerland	65.42
10	Finland	63.25	10	Malta	65.06
11	Chile	62.88	11	India	62.93
12	Norway	61.14	12	Norway	62.80
13	Luxembourg	60.91	13	Finland	62.61
14	Malta	60.60	14	Croatia	62.39
15	Latvia	60.75	15	Denmark	61.96
16	Switzerland	60.61	16	European Union (28)	60.65
17	Ukraine	60.60	17	Portugal	60.54
18	France	57.90	18	Ukraine	60.09
19	Egypt	57.53	19	Luxembourg	59.92
20	Croatia	56.97	20	Romania	59.42
21	Brazil	55.82	21	France	59.30
22	European Union (28)	55.82	22	Brazil	59.29
23	Germany	55.78	23	Italy	58.69
24	Romania	54.85	24	Egypt	57.49
25	Portugal	54.10	25	Mexico	56.82
26	Italy	53.92	26	Slovak Republic	56.61
27	Slovak Republic	52.69	27	Germany	55.18
28	Greece	52.59	28	Netherlands	54.11
29	Netherlands	50.89	29	Belarus	53.31
30	China	48.16	30	Greece	50.86
31	Estonia	48.05	31	Belgium	50.63
32	Mexico	47.01	32	Czech Republic	49.73
33	Thailand	46.76	33	China	49.60
34	Spain	46.03	34	Argentina	49.01
35	Belgium	45.73	35	Spain	48.97
36	South Africa	45.67	36	Austria	48.78
37	New Zealand	45.67	37	Thailand	48.71
38	Austria	44.74	38	Indonesia	48.68
39	Indonesia	44.65	39	South Africa	48.25
40	Belarus	44.18	40	Bulgaria	48.11
41	Ireland	44.04	41	Poland	47.59
42	Argentina	43.77	42	Hungary	46.79
43	Czech Republic	42.93	43	Slovenia	44.90
44	Slovenia	41.91	44	New Zealand	44.61
45	Cyprus	41.66	45	Estonia	44.37
46	Algeria	41.45	46	Cyprus	44.34
47	Hungary	41.17	47	Algeria	42.10
48	Turkey	40.76	48	Ireland	40.84
49	Bulgaria	40.12	49	Japan	40.63
50	Poland	39.98	50	Turkey	40.22
51	Japan	39.03	51	Malaysia	38.08
52	Russia	37.8	52	Russia	37.59
53	Malaysia	34.21	53	Kazakhstan	36.47
54	Kazakhstan	33.39	54	Canada	34.26
55	Canada	31.01	55	Australia	31.27
56	Australia	30.75	56	Taiwan	28.80
57	Iran	28.41	57	South Korea	28.53
58	South Korea	26.75	58	Iran	23.94
59	Taiwan	23.33	59	United States	18.82
60	Saudi Arabia	23.03	60	Saudi Arabia	8.82
61	United States	18.60			
