= Norouzi =

Norouzi (Persian: نوروزی) is an Iranian surname. Notable people with the surname include:

- Afshin Norouzi, Iranian table tennis player
- Anahita Norouzi Iranian-Canadian artist
- Daniel Norouzi, Danish footballer
- Elnaaz Norouzi, Iranian-German actress
- Hadi Norouzi, Iranian footballer
- Kambiz Norouzi, Iranian lawyer
- Mahtab Norouzi, Iranian Baloch master artisan in needlework
- Reza Norouzi, Iranian footballer
- Reza Fieze Norouzi, Iranian actor

== See also ==
- Nowruzi (disambiguation)
- Naoroji (disambiguation)
