= Nowruz (magazine) =

1903 Persian-language literature magazine

Naurūz
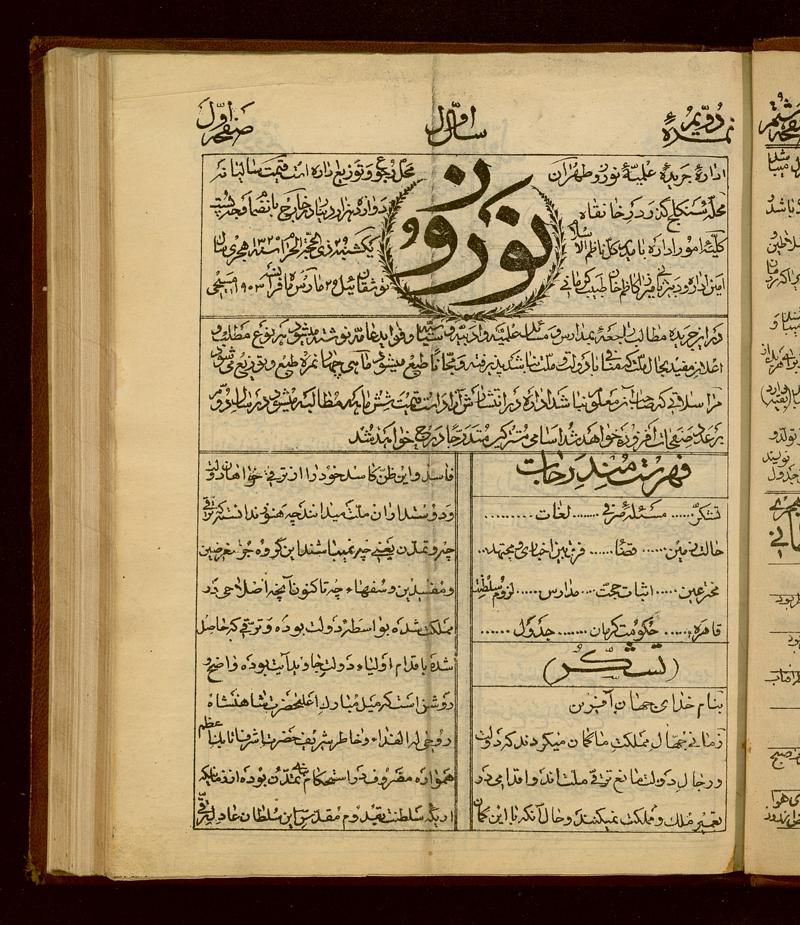
- Categories: Science, education, job training
- Founded: 1903
- Final issue Number: 1904
- Country: Iran
- Based in: Tehran
- Language: Persian
- Website: Naurūz

The Persian-language magazine Nowruz (Persian: نوروز; DMG: Naurūz; English: "New day" or "New Year") was published in Tehran in 1903 and 1904. A total of 48 issues was edited weekly in a single volume. In terms of content, the journal focused particularly on scientific articles and on education and job training in Iran.
