= Nowruzabad, East Azerbaijan =

Nowruzabad نوروزاباد
- Village
- Location within Iran
- Coordinates: 37°12′35″N 47°52′02″E
- Country: Iran
- Province: East Azerbaijan
- County: Meyaneh
- Bakhsh: Kaghazkonan
- Rural District: Qaflankuh-e Sharqi

Population (2006)
  - Total: 114
- Time zone: UTC+3:30 (IRST)
  - Summer (DST): UTC+4:30 (IRDT)

Nowruzabad (Persian: نوروزاباد, also Romanized as Nowrūzābād) is a village in Qaflankuh-e Sharqi Rural District, Kaghazkonan District, Meyaneh County, East Azerbaijan Province, Iran. At the 2006 census, its population was 114, in 30 families.
