= Nowruzabad, Qazvin =

Nowruzabad نوروزاباد
- Village
- Country: Iran
- Province: Qazvin
- County: Qazvin
- Bakhsh: Kuhin
- Rural District: Ilat-e Qaqazan-e Gharbi

Population (2006)
  - Total: 65
- Time zone: UTC+3:30 (IRST)
  - Summer (DST): UTC+4:30 (IRDT)

Nowruzabad (Persian: نوروزاباد, also Romanized as Nowrūzābād) is a village in Ilat-e Qaqazan-e Gharbi Rural District, Kuhin District, Qazvin County, Qazvin Province, Iran. At the 2006 census, its population was 65, in 17 families.
