= Nowruzabad, West Azerbaijan =

Coordinates: 36°44′52″N 46°27′26″E

Nowruzabad نوروزاباد
- Village
- Interactive map of Nowruzabad
- Country: Iran
- Province: West Azerbaijan
- County: Shahin Dezh
- Bakhsh: Central
- Rural District: Mahmudabad

Population (2006)
  - Total: 286
- Time zone: UTC+3:30 (IRST)
  - Summer (DST): UTC+4:30 (IRDT)

Nowruzabad (Persian: نوروزاباد, also Romanized as Nowrūzābād) is a village in Mahmudabad Rural District, in the Central District of Shahin Dezh County, West Azerbaijan Province, Iran. At the 2006 census, its population was 286, in 68 families.
