= Rishad Naoroji =

Billionaire and environmentalist

- Born: August 30, 1951 (age 74)
- Occupation: environmentalist
- Relatives: Adi Godrej (cousin)

Rishad Naoroji (born 30 August 1951) is an Indian billionaire, environmentalist, businessperson, author, and one of the members of the Godrej family.

== Career ==
Naoroji is the cousin of Indian billionaire Adi Godrej and gets his fortune from a one-fifth share in the Godrej family's assets, but has never been involved in the family businesses.

He founded the Raptor Research and Conservation Foundation to focus on the conservation of Indian birds of prey.

Naoroji sits on the governing council of the Bombay Natural History Society.

According to the Forbes Billionaire's List in 2021, Naoroji has an estimated net worth of $2.4 billion, making him the 1299th richest person in the world.

== Books ==
- Naoroji, Rishad (2006). Birds of Prey of the Indian subcontinent.
- Naoroji, Rishad (2011). "Breeding of the Red-headed Falcon Falco chicquera in Saurashtra, Gujarat, India". Forktail.
- Naoroji, Rishad (1991). "Shikra Accipiter badius taking carrion". J. Bombay Nat. Hist. Soc.

== See also ==
- Godrej family
