= Nowruzabad, Gilan =

Nowruzabad نوروزآباد
- Village
- Location within Iran
- Coordinates: 37°07′51″N 49°54′06″E
- Country: Iran
- Province: Gilan
- County: Siahkal
- Bakhsh: Central
- Rural District: Malfejan

Population (2006)
  - Total: 33
- Time zone: UTC+3:30 (IRST)

Nowruzabad (Persian: نوروزآباد, also Romanized as Nowrūzābād; also known as Norūzābād) is a village in Malfejan Rural District, in the Central District of Siahkal County, Gilan Province, Iran. At the 2016 census, its population was 18, in 6 families. Down from 33 in 2006.
