= Nowroji Road =

Road in Visakhapatnam, India

Coordinates: 17.713160°N 83.314840°E

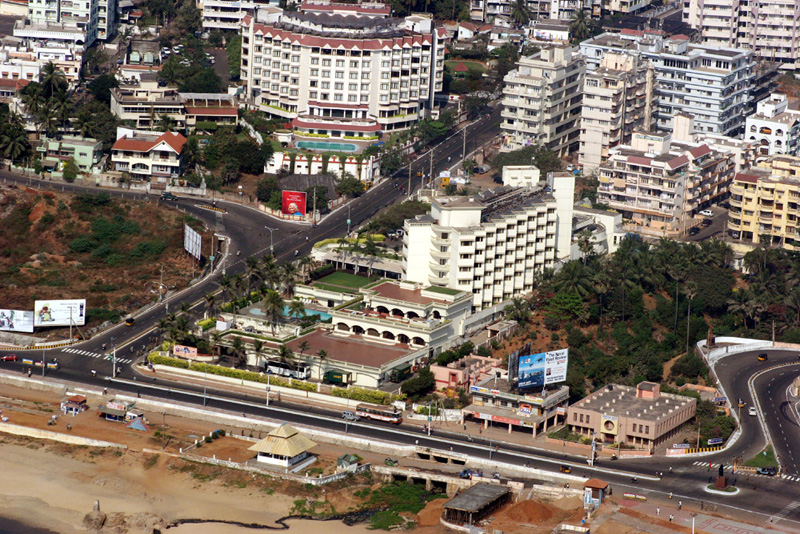
Nowroji Road Aerial View.

Nowroji Road is an important road located in the Indian city of Visakhapatnam. This road links Beach Road to Waltair Main Road. Nowroji Road is in a very posh area in the city and contains many star hotels. Royal families Bobbili, Vizianagaram, Jeypore and Kalahandi have large extents of land in the area.
