= Navroz Dubash =

Indian climate-change scientist

Navroz K Dubash is a professor at the Centre for Policy Research (CPR). He works on climate change policy and governance, the political economy of energy and water, and the regulatory state in the developing world. Widely published in these areas, Navroz serves on the Intergovernmental Panel on Climate Change as a Chapter Lead Author, Government of India advisory committees on climate change, energy and water policy, and the editorial boards of several international journals.

== Career ==
During his tenure as a professor at the National Institute of Public Finance and Policy, Navroz Dubash was a member of the Expert Group constituted by the Planning Commission to Review the Issue of Groundwater Ownership in India. NK Dubash has also served in the Expert Group on Low Carbon Strategies for Inclusive Growth, another committee constituted by the Planning Commission.

He has served as a Lead Author for three chapters (Chapter 15, Summary for Policymakers, and Technical Summary) in Working Group III of the IPCC's Fifth Assessment Report, which was published in 2014. He served as a member of the science advisory group to the UN Secretary General’s 2019 Climate Action Summit.

He served as one of the two coordinating lead author for chapter 13 in Working Group III of the IPCC's Sixth Assessment Report, which was finalized during the 56th session of the IPCC on 4 April 2022. The chapter deals with National and sub-national policies and institutions in the context of climate change mitigation.

Navroz has been actively engaged in the climate debate as a scholar, policy adviser and activist for 25 years. His previous affiliations include Jawaharlal Nehru University, the National Institute of Public Finance and Policy, and the World Resources Institute. He holds an MA and PhD in Energy and Resources from the University of California, Berkeley, and an AB cum laude in public and international affairs from Princeton University.

== Selected bibliography ==
Books
Title	Year of Publication	Reference
India in a Warming World: Integrating Climate Change and Development	2019	
Mapping Power: The Political Economy of Electricity in India's States	2018	
The Rise of the Regulatory State of the South: Infrastructure and Development in Emerging Economies	2013	
Handbook of Climate Change and India: Development, Politics and Governance	2011	
The Practice and Politics of Regulation: Regulatory Governance in Indian Electricity	2007	
Tubewell Capitalism: Groundwater Development and Agrarian Change in Gujarat	2002	
Power Politics: Equity and Environment in Electricity Reform	2002	
A Watershed in Global Governance: An Independent Assessment of the World Commission on Dams	2001	
The Right Conditions: The World Bank, Structural Adjustment and Forest Policy Reform	2000	
The Thin Green Line: World Bank Leverage and Forest Policy Reform in Papua New Guinea Colin Filer	2000	

== Awards ==
In 2015, he was conferred the 12th T N Khoshoo Memorial Award by ATREE for his work on Indian and global climate change governance and the international discourse on global climate governance. He was the sole recipient of the award that year.
