= Deh-e Nowruz, Lorestan =

Deh-e Nowruz ده نوروز
- Village
- Location within Iran
- Coordinates: 33°32′47″N 48°26′15″E
- Country: Iran
- Province: Lorestan
- County: Khorramabad
- Bakhsh: Central
- Rural District: Dehpir-e Shomali

Population (2006)
  - Total: 336
- Time zone: UTC+3:30 (IRST)
  - Summer (DST): UTC+4:30 (IRDT)

Deh-e Nowruz (Persian: ده نوروز, also Romanized as Deh-e Nowrūz) is a village in Dehpir-e Shomali Rural District, in the Central District of Khorramabad County, Lorestan Province, Iran. At the 2006 census, its population was 336, in 71 families.
