= Nowruzabad, Nurali =

Nowruzabad نوروزآباد
- Village
- Location within Iran
- Coordinates: 34°11′46″N 47°55′54″E
- Country: Iran
- Province: Lorestan
- County: Delfan
- Bakhsh: Central
- Rural District: Nurali

Population (2006)
  - Total: 62
- Time zone: UTC+3:30 (IRST)
  - Summer (DST): UTC+4:30 (IRDT)

Nowruzabad (Persian: نوروزآباد, also Romanized as Nowrūzābād) is a village in Nurali Rural District, in the Central District of Delfan County, Lorestan Province, Iran. At the 2006 census, its population was 62, in 14 families.
