= Climate Action Tracker =

Independent scientific environmental project

- Abbreviation: CAT
- Formation: 2009
- Website: climateactiontracker.org

Climate Action Tracker (CAT) is an independent scientific project with the aim of monitoring government action to achieve their reduction of greenhouse gas emissions with regard to international agreements – specifically the globally agreed Paris Agreement aim of "holding warming well below 2°C, and pursuing efforts to limit warming to 1.5°C". It is tracking climate action in 39 countries and the European Union responsible for over 85% of global emissions. Climate Action Tracker is the product of two organisations: NewClimate Institute and Climate Analytics.

The actions it tracks are: - Effect of climate policies and action on emissions. - Impact of pledges, targets and nationally determined contributions on national emissions over the time period to 2030, and where possible beyond. - Comparability of effort against countries' fair share and modelled domestic pathways.

== COP26 ==
Toward the end of the 2021 United Nations Climate Change Conference (COP26), Climate Action Tracker produced a report concluding that the current "wave of net‑zero emission goals [are] not matched by action on the ground" and that the world is likely headed for more than 2.4°C of warming by the end of the century.
