= Politics of climate change =

Interaction of societies and governments with current climate change

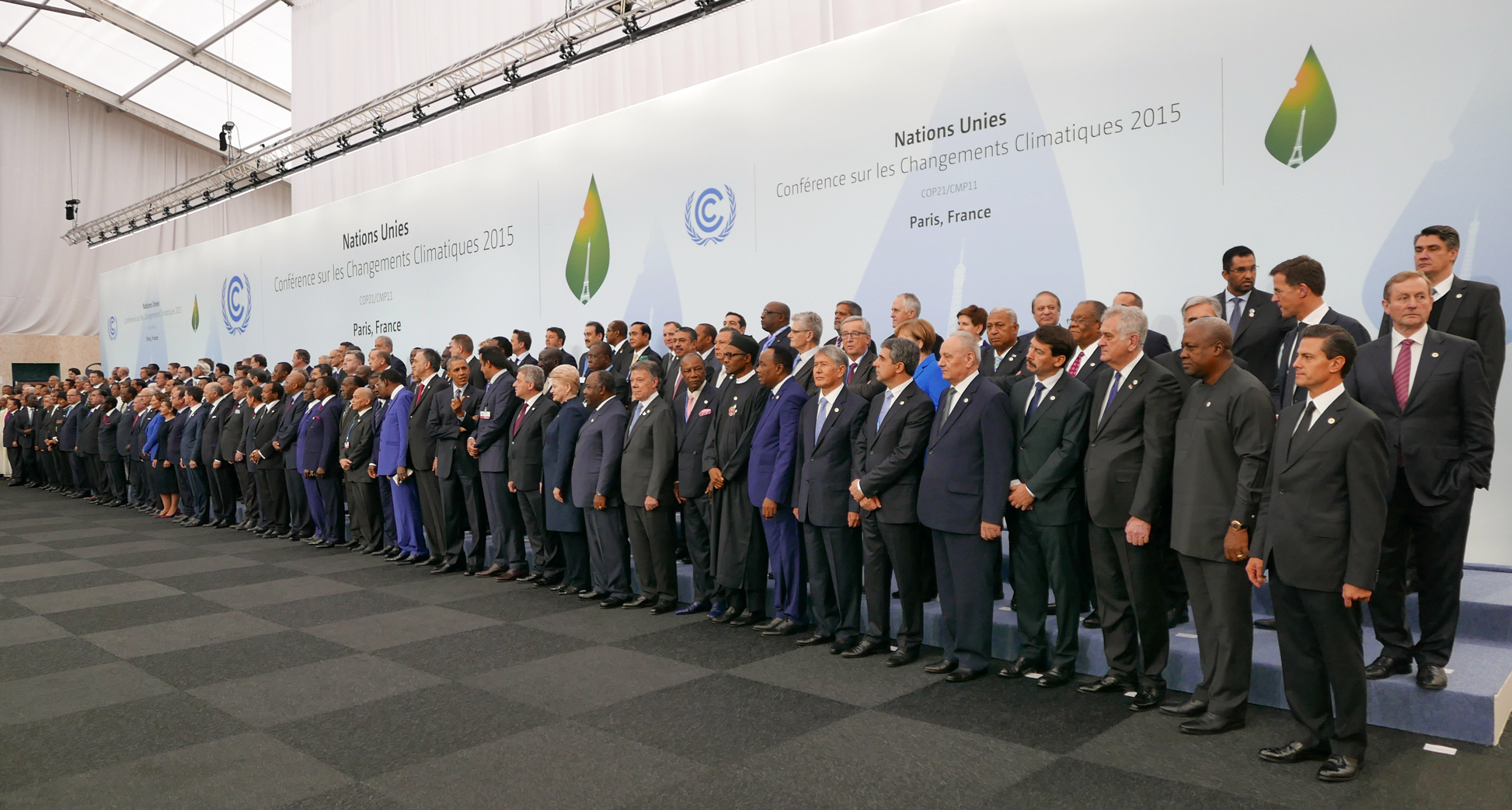
Heads of delegations at the 2015 United Nations Paris conference

The politics of climate change results from different perspectives on how to respond to climate change. Global warming is driven largely by the emissions of greenhouse gases due to human activity, especially the burning of fossil fuels, certain industries like cement and steel production, and land use for agriculture and forestry. Since the Industrial Revolution, fossil fuels have provided the main source of energy for economic and technological development. The centrality of fossil fuels and other carbon-intensive industries has resulted in much resistance to climate policy, despite widespread scientific consensus that such policy is necessary.

Climate change first emerged as a political issue in the 1970s. Efforts to mitigate climate change have been prominent on the international political agenda since the 1990s, and are also increasingly addressed at national and local level. Climate change is a complex global problem. Greenhouse gas (GHG) emissions contribute to global warming across the world, regardless of where the emissions originate. Yet the impact of global warming varies widely depending on how vulnerable a location or economy is to its effects. Global warming is on the whole having negative impact, which is predicted to worsen as heating increases. Ability to benefit from both fossil fuels and renewable energy vary substantially from nation to nation.

Early international climate talks made little progress because countries disagreed on who should reduce emissions, who benefited, and who faced the biggest risks. In the 21st century, there has been increased attention to mechanisms like climate finance in order for vulnerable nations to adapt to climate change. In some nations and local jurisdictions, climate friendly policies have been adopted that go well beyond what was committed to at international level. Yet local reductions in GHG emission that such policies achieve have limited ability to slow global warming unless the overall volume of GHG emission declines across the planet.

Since the 2020s, the feasibility of replacing fossil fuels with renewable energy sources has significantly increased, with some countries now generating almost all their electricity from renewables. Public awareness of the climate change threat has risen, in large part due to social movement led by youth and visibility of the impacts of climate change, such as extreme weather events and flooding caused by sea level rise. Many surveys show a growing proportion of voters support tackling climate change as a high priority, making it easier for politicians to commit to policies that include climate action. The COVID-19 pandemic and economic recession lead to widespread calls for a "green recovery", with some polities like the European Union successfully integrating climate action into policy change. Outright climate change denial had become a much less influential force by 2019, and opposition has pivoted to strategies of encouraging delay or inaction.

== Climate policy ==
Climate policy or climate change policy is policy about climate change. It is often decided by national governments - for example the climate policy of China. It may include policy on reducing greenhouse gas emissions to limit climate change, and also adapting to climate change. National climate policy sometimes conflicts with sub-national or bloc policy, for example the climate change policy of Washington (state) diverges from the climate change policy of the United States, and EU climate policy can conflict with other national policies.

Climate policies may have co-benefits for health policy such as by: reducing air pollution, and increasing walking and cycling; they may also help energy policy by reducing oil imports. Public support for policies depends on: how effective people think they are in reducing emissions, their impact on poor people, their effect on respondents' households, and how well they understand them. Climate-economy modelling may help when deciding policy. Policy, such as target dates for net-zero emissions, may be put into law.

The usage of military termes in climate policy is dangerous and can lead to unintended consequences.

== Policy debate ==
Like all policy debates, the political debate on climate change is fundamentally about action. Various distinct arguments underpin the politics of climate change - such as different assessments of the urgency of the threat, and on the feasibility, advantages and disadvantages of various responses. But essentially, these all relate to potential responses to climate change.

The statements that form political arguments can be divided into two types: positive and normative statements. Positive statements can generally be clarified or refuted by careful definition of terms, and scientific evidence. Whereas normative statements about what one "ought" to do often relate at least partly to morality, and are essentially a matter of judgement. Experience has indicated that better progress is often made at debates if participants attempt to disentangle the positive and normative parts of their arguments, reaching agreement on the positive statements first. In the early stages of a debate, the normative positions of participants can be strongly influenced by perceptions of the best interests of whatever constituency they represent. In achieving exceptional progress at the 2015 Paris conference, Christiana Figueres and others noted it was helpful that key participants were able to move beyond a competitive mindset concerning competing interests, to normative statements that reflected a shared abundance based collaborative mindset. (Note: Dessler (2020), broadly agrees that this more collaborative approach was key to success at Paris, though warned that one of the main parties which drove the change (China) had by 2018 returned to a less friendly approach, seeking to magnify differences between developed and less developed nations.)

Actions in response to climate change can be divided into three classes: mitigation – actions to reduce greenhouse gas emissions and to enhance carbon sinks, adaptation – actions to defend against the negative results of global warming, and solar geoengineering – a technology in which sunlight would be reflected back to outer space.

Most 20th century international debate on climate change focused almost entirely on mitigation. It was sometimes considered defeatist to pay much attention to adaptation. Also, compared to mitigation, adaptation is more a local matter, with different parts of the world facing vastly different threats and opportunities from climate change. By the early 21st century, while mitigation still receives most attention in political debates, it is no longer the sole focus. Some degree of adaptation is now widely considered essential, and is discussed internationally at least at high level, though which specific actions to take remain mostly a local matter. A commitment to provide $100 billion per year worth of funding to developing countries was made at the 2009 Copenhagen Summit. At Paris, it was clarified that allocation of the funding should involve a balanced split between adaptation and mitigation, though as of December 2020, not all funding had been provided, and what had been delivered was going mainly to mitigation projects. By 2019, possibilities for geoengineering were also increasingly being discussed, and were expected to become more prominent in future debates.

Political debate on how to mitigate tends to vary depending on the scale of governance concerned. Different considerations apply for international debate, compared with national and municipal level discussion. In the 1990s, when climate change first became prominent on the political agenda, there was optimism that the problem could be successfully tackled. The then recent signing of the 1987 Montreal Protocol to protect the ozone layer had indicated that the world was able to act collectively to address a threat warned about by scientists, even when it was not yet causing significant harm to humans. Yet by the early 2000s GHG emissions had continued to rise, with little sign of agreement to penalise emitters or reward climate friendly behaviour. It had become clear that achieving global agreement for effective action to limit global warming would be much more challenging. (Note: In addition to the normal collective action problems, other difficulties have included: 1.) The fact that fossil fuel use has been common across the economy, unlike the relatively few firms that controlled manufacture of products containing the CFCs, which had been damaging the Ozone layer. 2.) Incompatible views from different nations on the level of responsibility that highly developed countries had in assisting less developed controls to control their emissions without inhibiting their economic growth. 3.) Difficulty in getting humans to take significant action to limit a threat that is far away in the future. 4.) The dilemma between the conflicting needs to reach agreements that could be accepted by all, versus the desirability for the agreement to have significant practical effect on human activity. See e.g. Dryzek (2011) Chpt. 3, and Dessler (2020) Chpt. 1, 4 & 5.) Some politicians, such as Arnold Schwarzenegger with his slogan "terminate pollution", say that activists should generate optimism by focusing on the health co-benefits of climate action.

The EU's Carbon Border Adjustment Mechanism (CBAM) is among the trade-related measures introduced to address climate concerns. A proposed enhancement—known as "CBAM-plus"—aims to channel CBAM revenues towards decarbonisation initiatives in developing exporting countries. By also recognising non-pricing climate policies, CBAM-plus could promote more comprehensive global mitigation efforts.

=== Multilateral ===
Greenhouse gas emissions per person in the highest-emitting countries. Though China has the greatest total annual carbon dioxide emissions, the U.S. and a few other high-emitting countries exceed China in per capita emissions.

Share of global carbon dioxide emissions, total for each country without regard to population size

Climate change became a fixture on the global political agenda in the early 1990s, with United Nations Climate Change conferences set to run yearly. These annual events are also called Conferences of the Parties (COPs). Major landmark COPs were the 1997 Kyoto Protocol, the 2009 Copenhagen Summit and the 2015 Paris conference. Kyoto was initially considered promising, yet by the early 2000s its results had proved disappointing. Copenhagen saw a major attempt to move beyond Kyoto with a much stronger package of commitments, yet largely failed. Paris was widely considered successful, yet how effective it will be at reducing long term global warming remains to be seen.

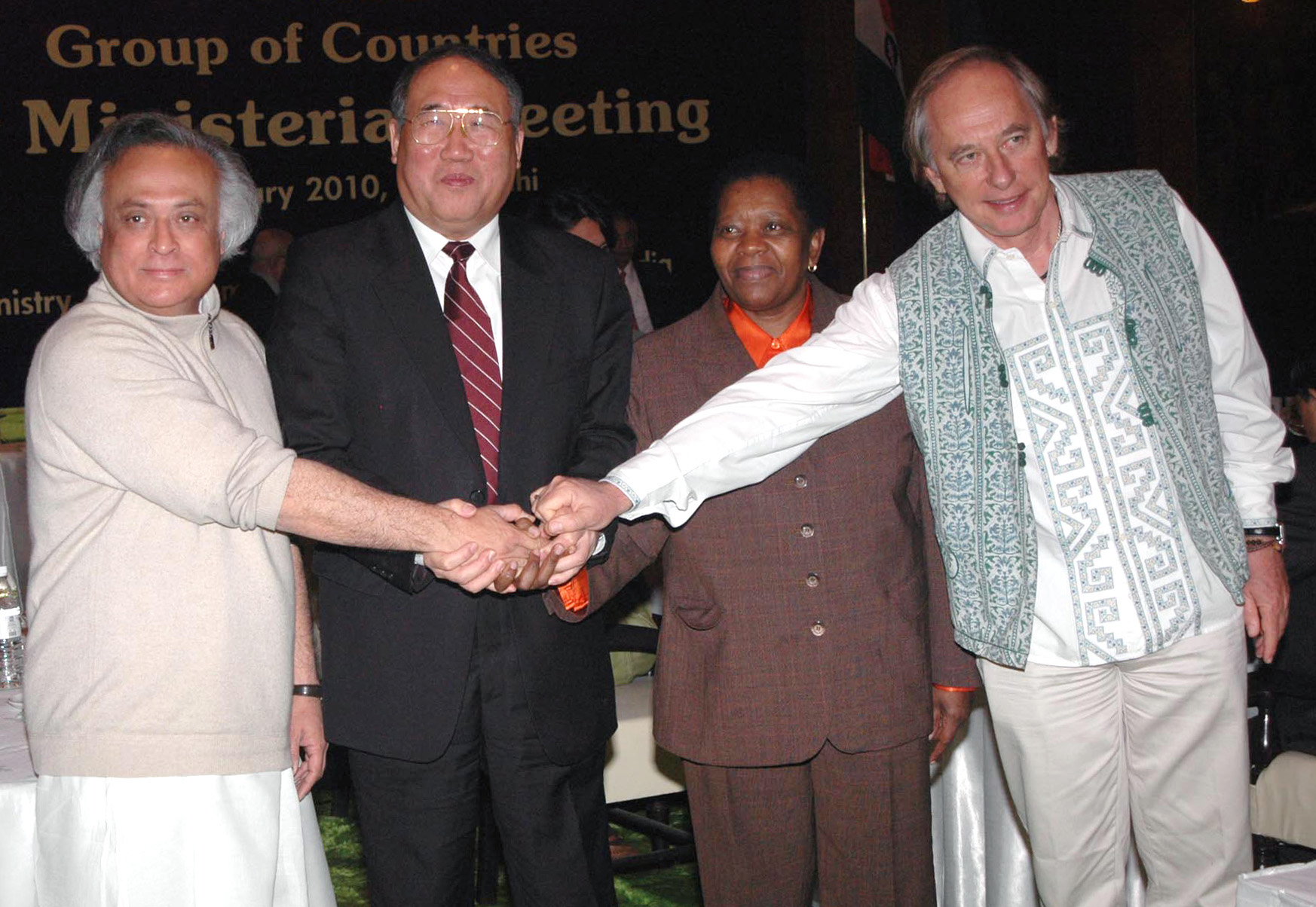
Environment ministers from BASIC countries meet to discuss climate policy after COP15.

At international level, there are three broad approaches to emissions reduction that nations can attempt to negotiate. Firstly, the adoption of emissions reductions targets. Secondly, setting a carbon price. Lastly, creating a largely voluntary set of processes to encourage emission reduction, which include the sharing of information and progress reviews. These approaches are largely complementary, though at various conferences much of the focus has often been on a single approach. Until about 2010, international negotiations focused largely on emissions targets. The success of the Montreal treaty in reducing emissions that damaged the ozone layer suggested that targets could be effective. Yet in the case of greenhouse gas reductions, targets have not in general led to substantial cuts in emissions. Ambitious targets have usually not been met. Attempts to impose severe penalties that would incentivize more determined efforts to meet challenging targets, have always been blocked by at least one or two nations.

In the 21st century, there is widespread agreement that a carbon price is the most effective way to reduce emissions, at least in theory. Generally though, nations have been reluctant to adopt a high carbon price, or in most cases any price at all. One of the main reasons for this reluctance is the problem of carbon leakage – the phenomena where activities producing GHG emissions are moved out of the jurisdiction that imposes the carbon price thus depriving the jurisdiction of jobs & revenue, and to no benefit, as the emissions will be released elsewhere. Nonetheless, the percentage of the worlds' emissions that are covered by a carbon price rose from 5% in 2005, to 15% by 2019, and should reach over 40% once China's carbon price comes fully into force. Existing carbon price regimes have been implemented mostly independently by the European Union, nations and sub national jurisdictions acting autonomously.

The largely voluntary pledge and review system where states make their own plans for emissions reduction was introduced in 1991, but abandoned before the 1997 Kyoto treaty, where the focus was on securing agreement for "top down" emissions targets. The approach was revived at Copenhagen, and gained further prominence with the 2015 Paris Agreement, though pledges came to be called nationally determined contributions (NDCs). These are meant to be re-submitted in enhanced form every 5 years. How effective this approach is remains to be seen. Some countries submitted elevated NDCs in 2021, around the time of the Glasgow conference. Accounting rules for carbon trading were agreed at the 2021 Glasgow COP meeting.

In 2025 the agreement of the European Union and China about joint climate action is considered as very important for uphold multilateralism and global governance on climate issues. The agreement came at time of global instability, tensions and withdrawal of the Donald Trump government from the Paris agreement.

=== Regional, national and sub-national ===
The Climate Change Performance Index ranks countries by greenhouse gas emissions (40% of score), renewable energy (20%), energy use (20%), and climate policy (20%).: High / Medium / Low / Very low

Policies to reduce GHG emissions are set by either national or sub national jurisdictions, or at regional level in the case of the European Union. Much of the emission reduction policies that have been put into place have been beyond those required by international agreements. Examples include the introduction of a carbon price by some individual US states, or Costa Rica reaching 99% electrical power generation by renewables in the 2010s.

Actual decisions to reduce emissions or deploy clean technologies are mostly not made by governments themselves, but by individuals, businesses and other organizations. Yet it is national and local governments that set policies to encourage climate friendly activity. Broadly these policies can be divided into four types: firstly, the implementation of a carbon price mechanism and other financial incentives; secondly prescriptive regulations, for example mandating that a certain percentage of electricity generation must be from renewables; thirdly, direct government spending on climate friendly activity or research; and fourthly, approaches based on information sharing, education and encouraging voluntary climate friendly behavior. Local politics is sometimes combined with air pollution, for example the politics of creating low emission zones in cities may also aim to reduce carbon emissions from road transport.

=== Non-governmental actors ===
Individuals, businesses and NGOs can affect the politics of climate change both directly and indirectly. Mechanisms include individual rhetoric, aggregate expression of opinion by means of polls, and mass protests. Historically, a significant proportion of these protests have been against climate friendly policies. Since the 2000 UK fuel protests there have been dozens of protests across the world against fuel taxes or the ending of fuel subsidies. Since 2019 and the advent of the school strike and Extinction Rebellion, pro climate protests have become more prominent. Indirect channels for apolitical actors to effect the politics of climate change include funding or working on green technologies, and the fossil fuel divestment movement.

==== Special interests and lobbying by non-country actors ====
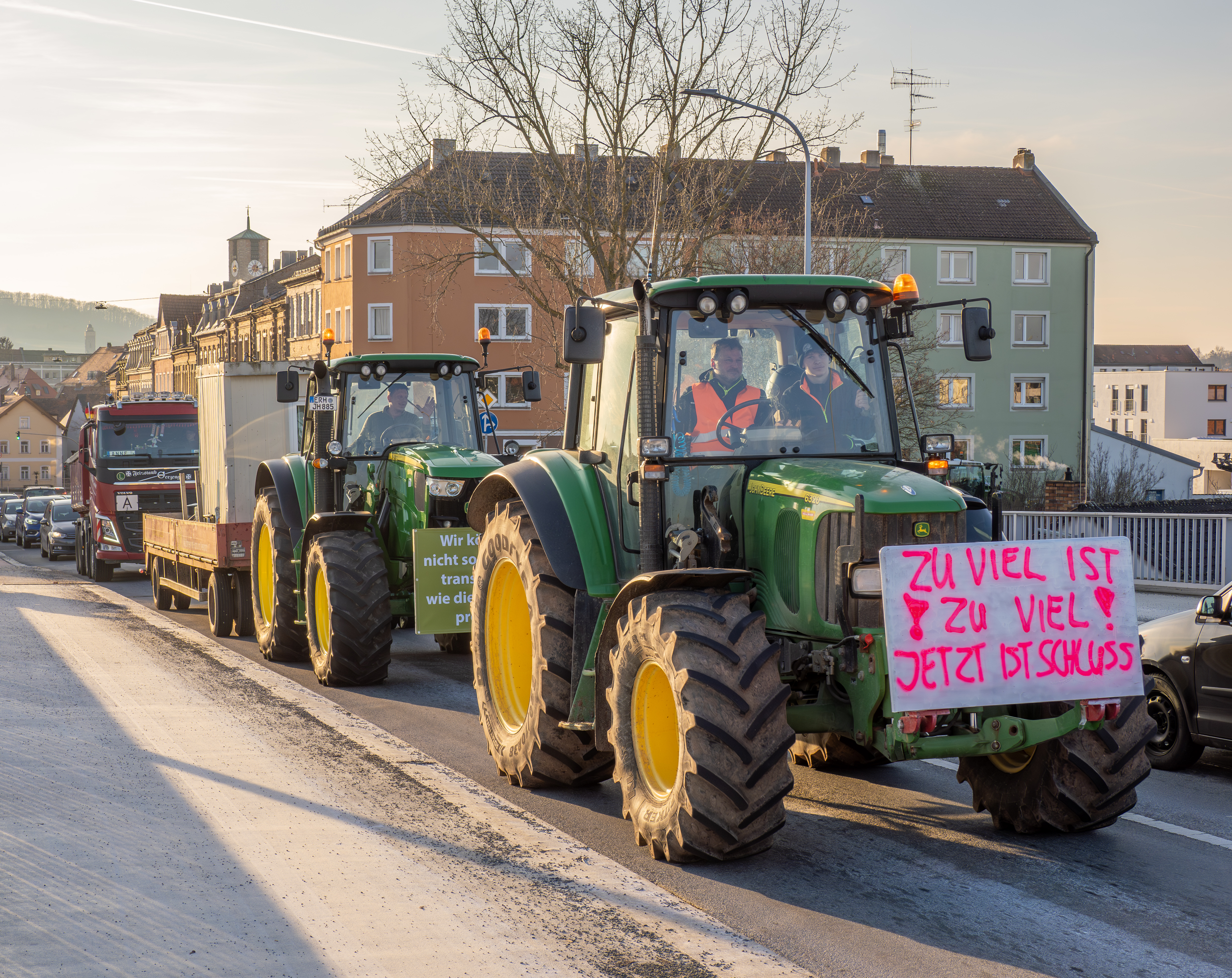
Farmers protest against the European Green Deal in 2024

There are numerous special interest groups, organizations, and corporations who have public and private positions on the multifaceted topic of global warming. The following is a partial list of the types of special interest parties that have shown an interest in the politics of global warming:

- Fossil fuel companies: Traditional fossil fuel corporations stand to lose from stricter global warming regulations, though there are exceptions. The fact fossil fuel companies are engaged in energy trading might mean that their participation in trading schemes and other such mechanisms could give them a unique advantage, so it is unclear whether every traditional fossil fuel companies would always be against stricter global warming policies. As an example, Enron, a traditional gas pipeline company with a large trading desk heavily lobbied the United States government to regulate CO_{2}: they thought that they would dominate the energy industry if they could be at the center of energy trading.
- Farmers and agribusiness are an important lobby but vary in their views on effects of climate change on agriculture and greenhouse gas emissions from agriculture and, for example, the role of the EU Common Agricultural Policy.
- Financial Institutions: Financial institutions generally support policies against global warming, particularly the implementation of carbon trading schemes and the creation of market mechanisms that associate a price with carbon. These new markets require trading infrastructures, which banking institutions can provide. Financial institutions are also well positioned to invest, trade and develop various financial instruments that they could profit from through speculative positions on carbon prices and the use of brokerage and other financial functions like insurance and derivative instruments.
- Environmental groups: Environmental advocacy groups generally favor strict restrictions on CO_{2} emissions. Environmental groups, as activists, engage in raising awareness.
- Renewable energy and energy efficiency companies: companies in wind, solar and energy efficiency generally support stricter global warming policies. They expect their share of the energy market to expand as fossil fuels are made more expensive through trading schemes or taxes.
- Nuclear power companies: support and benefit from carbon pricing or subsidies of low-carbon energy production, as nuclear power produces minimal greenhouse gas emissions.
- Electricity distribution companies: may lose from solar panels but benefit from electric vehicles.
- Traditional retailers and marketers: traditional retailers, marketers, and the general corporations respond by adopting policies that resonate with their customers. If "being green" provides customer appeal, then they could undertake modest programs to please and better align with their customers. However, since the general corporation does not make a profit from their particular position, it is unlikely that they would strongly lobby either for or against a stricter global warming policy position.
- Medics: often say that climate change and air pollution can be tackled together and so save millions of lives.
- Information and communications technology companies: say their products help others combat climate change, tend to benefit from reductions in travel, and many purchase green electricity.

The various interested parties sometimes align with one another to reinforce their message, for example electricity companies fund the purchase of electric school buses to benefit medics by reducing the load on the health service whilst at the same time selling more electricity. Sometimes industries will fund specialty nonprofit organizations to raise awareness and lobby on their behest.

== Collective action ==
Current climate politics are influenced by a number of social and political movements focused on different parts of building political will for climate action. This includes the climate justice movement, youth climate movement and movements to divest from fossil fuel industries.

=== Divestment movement ===
As of 2021, 1,300 institutions possessing US$14.6 trillion have divested from the fossil fuel industry.

Fossil fuel divestment or fossil fuel divestment and investment in climate solutions is an attempt to reduce climate change by exerting social, political, and economic pressure for the institutional divestment of assets including stocks, bonds, and other financial instruments connected to companies involved in extracting fossil fuels.

Fossil fuel divestment campaigns emerged on college and university campuses in the United States in 2011 with students urging their administrations to turn endowment investments in the fossil fuel industry into investments in clean energy and communities most impacted by climate change. In 2012, Unity College in Maine became the first institution of higher learning to divest its endowment from fossil fuels. While fossil fuel divestment focusses on financial asset management, a related movement, Fossil Free Research, campaigns for universities to stop accepting research funding and sponsorships from fossil fuel companies.

By 2015, fossil fuel divestment was reportedly the fastest growing divestment movement in history. As of July 2023, more than 1593 institutions with assets totalling more than $40.5 trillion in assets worldwide had begun or committed some form of divestment of fossil fuels.

Divesters cite several reasons for their decisions. To some, it is a means of aligning investments with core values; to others, it is a tactic for combatting the fossil fuel industry; to others, it is a way to protect portfolios from climate-related financial risk. Financial research suggests that, in the longer term, fossil fuel divestment has positively impacted investors' returns.

=== Youth movement ===
Global warming—the progression from cooler historical temperatures (blue) to recent warmer temperatures (red)—is being experienced disproportionately by younger generations.

Successive generations are predicted to experience progressively greater unprecedented lifetime exposure (ULE) events such as heat waves. About 111 million children born in 2020 will live with unprecedented heatwave exposure in a world that warms by 3.5 °C, compared with 62 million with only 1.5 °C of warming.

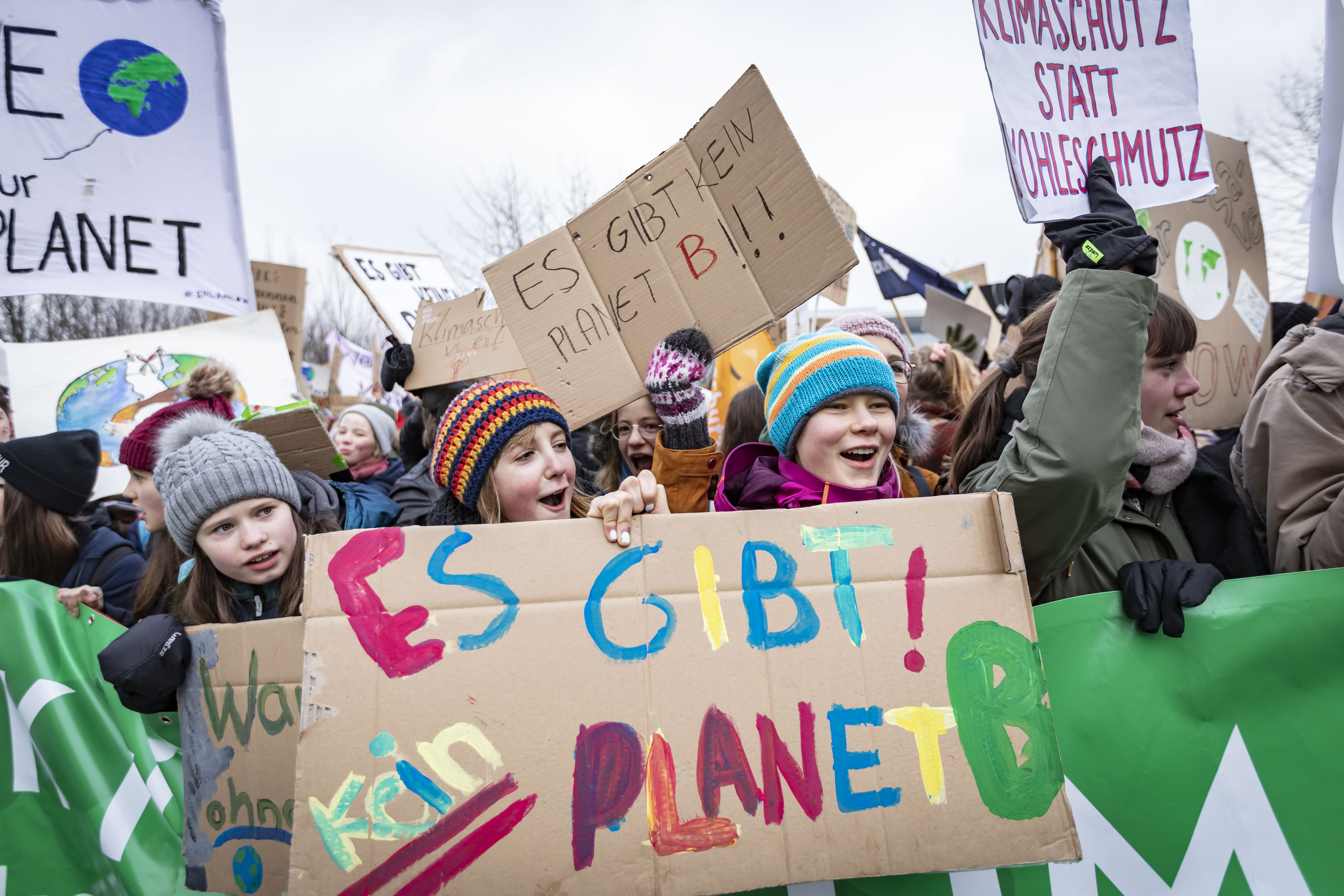
Children at a Fridays for Future protest in Germany, 2019

Fridays for Future (FFF), also known as the School Strike for Climate (Swedish: Skolstrejk för klimatet [ˈskûːlstrɛjk fœr klɪˈmɑ̌ːtɛt]), is an international movement of school students who skip Friday classes to participate in demonstrations to demand action from political leaders to prevent climate change and for the fossil fuel industry to transition to renewable energy. Publicity and widespread organising began after Swedish pupil Greta Thunberg staged a protest in August 2018 outside of the Swedish parliament, the Riksdag, holding a sign that read "Skolstrejk för klimatet" ("School strike for the climate").

A global strike on 15 March 2019 gathered more than one million strikers in 2,200 strikes organised in 125 countries. On 24 May 2019, in the second global strike, 1,600 protests across 150 countries drew hundreds of thousands of strikers. The May protests were timed to coincide with the 2019 European Parliament election.

The 2019 Global Week for Future was a series of 4,500 strikes across over 150 countries, focused around Friday 20 September and Friday 27 September. Likely the largest climate strikes in world history, the 20 September strikes gathered roughly 4 million protesters, many of them schoolchildren, including 1.4 million in Germany. On 27 September, an estimated two million people participated in demonstrations worldwide, including over one million protesters in Italy and several hundred thousand protesters in Canada.

== Outlook ==
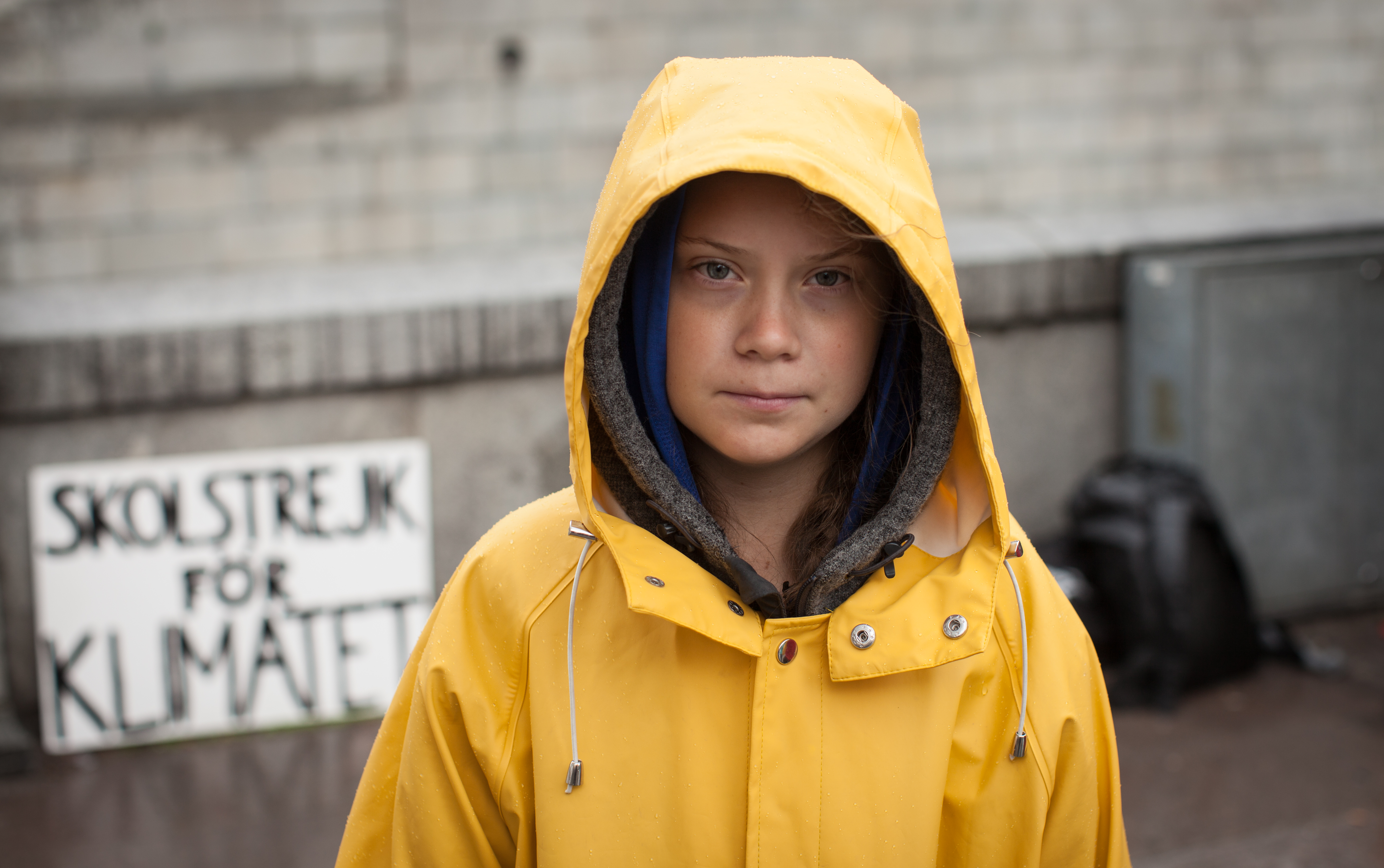
Greta Thunberg's Fridays for Future movement, begun in August 2018, has been influential in raising public awareness of the threat from global warming, her influence described as the Greta effect.

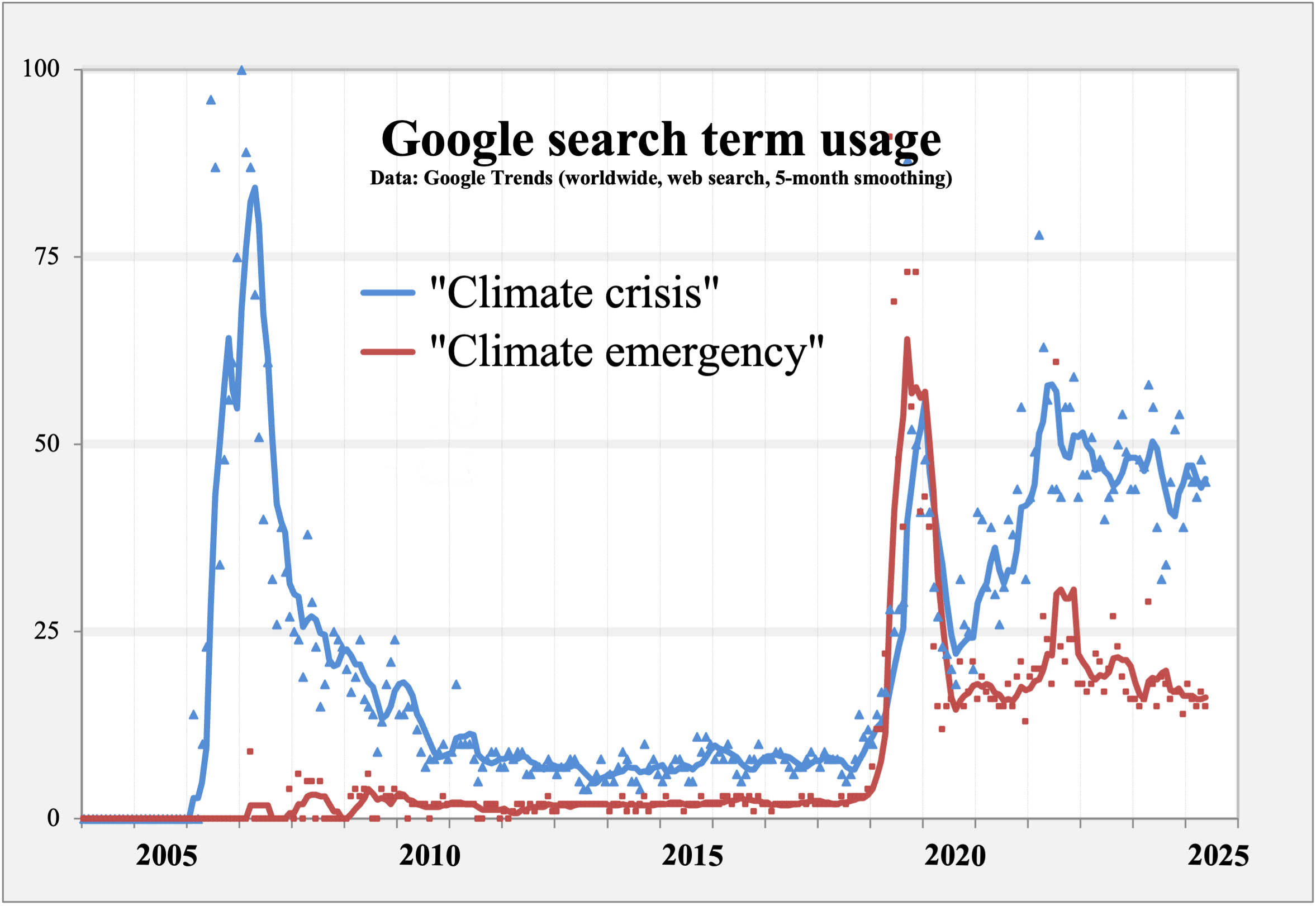
Google Trends data shows that online searches for the terms, climate crisis and climate emergency, surged in 2019. A similar surge occurred after the 2006 Al Gore documentary, An Inconvenient Truth.

Historical political attempts to agree on policies to limit global warming have largely failed to mitigate climate change. Commentators have expressed optimism that the 2020s can be more successful, due to various recent developments and opportunities that were not present during earlier periods. Other commentators have expressed warnings that there is now very little time to act in order to have any chance of keeping warming below 1.5 °C, or even to have a good chance of keeping global heating under 2 °C.

According to Torsten Lichtenau, leading expert in global carbon transition, there was a huge peak on corporate climate action in 2021 – 2022 at the time of COP26, but in 2024 "it's dropped back to 2019 levels." As for 2024 issues like geopolitics, inflation and artificial intelligence became more important for corporations even though the number of climate concerned consumers rose. 2024 was the first year in which the amount of money given to ESG declined.

=== Opportunities ===
In the late 2010s, various developments conducive to climate friendly politics saw commentators express optimism that the 2020s might see good progress in addressing the threat of global heating.

==== Tipping point in public opinion ====
In this 2022 Pew survey, a majority said climate change is a major threat to their country, with respondents from almost half the countries ranking climate change highest of five listed threats.

In a UNDP survey covering 77 countries, most respondents from top fossil fuel-producing countries favored a quick transition away from fossil fuels.

The year 2019 has been described as "the year the world woke up to climate change", driven by factors such growing recognition of the global warming threat resulting from recent extreme weather events, the Greta effect and the IPPC 1.5 °C report.

In 2019, the secretary general of OPEC recognized the school strike movement as the greatest threat faced by the fossil fuel industry. According to Christiana Figueres, once about 3.5% of a population start participating in non violent protest, they are always successful in sparking political change, with the success of Greta Thunberg's Fridays for Future movement suggesting that reaching this threshold may be obtainable.

A 2023 review study published in One Earth stated that opinion polls show that most people perceive climate change as occurring now and close by. The study concluded that seeing climate change as more distant does not necessarily result in less climate action, and reducing psychological distancing does not reliably increase climate action.

==== Reduced influence of climate change denial ====
By 2019, outright climate change denial had become a much less influential force than it had been in previous years. Reasons for this include the increasing frequency of extreme weather events, more effective communication on the part of climate scientists, and the Greta effect. As an example, in 2019 the Cato Institute closed down its program seeking to raise uncertainty about climate science. Studies show that conservatives and liberals are not significantly different in their support for climate solutions; however, the way these solutions are framed can greatly influence their effectiveness. For example, conservatives respond more positively to messages about actions like tree planting when the language avoids explicit references to climate change.

==== Growth of renewable energy ====
Renewable energy is an inexhaustible source of naturally replenishing energy. The major renewable energy sources are wind, hydropower, solar, geothermal, and biomass. In 2020, renewable energy generated 29% of world electricity.

In the wake of the Paris Agreement, adopted by 196 Parties, 194 of these Parties have submitted their Nationally Determined Contributions (NDCs), i.e., climate pledges, as of November 2021. There are many different efforts used by these countries to help include renewable energy investments such as 102 countries have implemented tax credits, 101 countries include some sort of public investment, and 100 countries currently use tax reductions. The largest CO_{2} emitters tend to be industrialized countries like the US, China, UK, and India. These countries aren't implementing enough industrial policies (188) compared to deployment policies (more than 1,000).

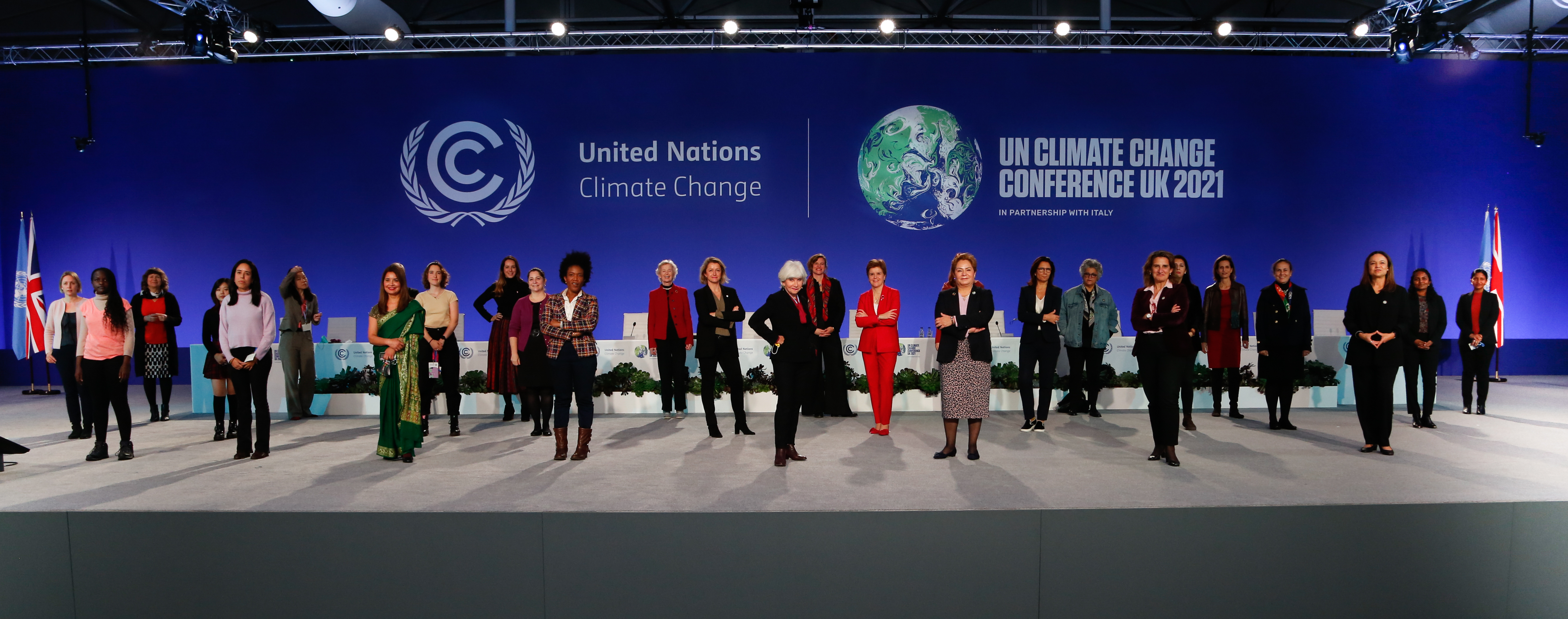
A group of women world leaders at COP26 in Glasgow

In November 2021, the 26th United Nation Conference of the Parties (COP26) took place in Glasgow, Scotland. Almost 200 nations agreed to accelerate the fight against climate change and commit to more effective climate pledges. Some of the new pledges included reforms on methane gas pollution, deforestation, and coal financing. Surprisingly, the US and China (the two largest carbon emitters) also both agreed to work together on efforts to prevent global warming from surpassing 1.5 degrees Celsius. Some scientists, politicians, and activist say that not enough was done at this summit and that we will still reach that 1.5 degree tipping point. An Independent report by Climate Action Tracker said the commitments were "lip service" and "we will emit roughly twice as much in 2030 as required for 1.5 degrees."

As of 2020, the feasibility of replacing energy from fossil fuel with nuclear and especially renewable energy has much increased, with dozens of countries now generating more than half of their electricity from renewable sources.

==== Green recovery ====
Green recovery packages are proposed environmental, regulatory, and fiscal reforms to rebuild prosperity in the wake of an economic crisis, such as the COVID-19 recession or the 2008 financial crisis. They pertain to fiscal measures that intend to recover economic growth while also positively benefitting the environment, including measures for renewable energy, efficient energy use, nature-based solutions, sustainable transport, green innovation and green jobs, amongst others.

Support for a green recovery in response to the COVID-19 pandemic has come from multiple political parties, governments, activists, and academia across the globe. Following similar measures in response to the GFC, a key goal of the packages is to ensure that actions to combat recession also combat climate change. These actions include the reduction of coal, oil, and gas use, clean transport, renewable energy, eco-friendly buildings, and sustainable corporate or financial practices. Green recovery initiatives are supported by the United Nations (UN) and the Organisation for Economic Co-operation and Development (OECD). Several global initiatives have provided live tracking of national fiscal responses, including the Global Recovery Observatory (from Oxford University, the UN, and the International Monetary Fund (IMF)), the Energy Policy Tracker, and the OECD's Green Recovery Tracker.

Delineating between rescue and recovery investment, in March 2021 analysis by the Global Recovery Observatory found that 18% of recovery investment and 2.5% of total spending was expected to enhance sustainability. In July 2021, the International Energy Agency supported that analysis, noting that only around 2% of economic bailout money worldwide was going to clean energy. According to a 2022 analysis of the $14tn that G20 countries spent as economic stimulus, only about 6% of pandemic recovery spending was allocated to areas that will also cut greenhouse-gas emissions, including electrifying vehicles, making buildings more energy efficient and installing renewables.

=== Challenges ===
Despite various promising conditions, commentators tend to warn that several difficult challenges remain, which need to be overcome if climate change politics is to result in a substantial reduction of greenhouse gas emissions. For example, increasing tax on meat can be politically difficult.

==== Urgency ====
As of 2021, CO_{2} levels have already increased by about 50% since the pre-industrial era, with billions of tons more being released each year. Global warming has already passed the point where it is beginning to have a catastrophic impact in some localities. So major policy changes need to be implemented very soon if the risk of escalating environmental impact is to be avoided.

==== Centrality of fossil fuel ====
Energy from fossil fuels remains central to the worlds economy, accounting for about 80% of its energy generation as of 2019. Suddenly removing fossil fuel subsidies from consumers has often been found to cause riots. While clean energy can sometimes be cheaper, (Note: Whether it actually is cheaper depends on various factors like the fluctuating price of fossil fuels on the global market, the endowments that the Jurisdiction enjoys (sunlight, amount of flowing water etc. ) and if the new renewable energy infrastructure is replacing an existing fossil fuel plant, on the timescale under consideration, which determines whether construction costs can be offset.) provisioning large amounts of renewable energy in a short period of time tends to be challenging. According to a 2023 report by the International Energy Agency, coal emissions grew 243 Mt to a new all-time high of almost 15.5 Gt. This 1.6% increase was faster than the 0.4% annual average growth over the past decade. In 2022 the European Central Bank argued that high energy prices were accelerating the energy transition away from fossil fuel, but that governments should take steps to prevent energy poverty without hindering the move to low carbon energy.

==== Inactivism ====
While outright denial of climate change is much less prevalent in the 2020s compared to the preceding decades, many arguments continue to be made against taking action to limit GHG emissions. Such arguments include the view that there are better ways to spend available funds (such as adaptation), that it would be better to wait until new technology is developed as that would make mitigation cheaper, that technology and innovation will render climate change moot or resolve certain aspects, and that the future negative effects of climate change should be heavily discounted compared to current needs.

==== Fossil fuel lobby and political spending ====
The largest oil and gas corporations that comprise Big Oil and their industry lobbyist arm, the American Petroleum Institute (API), spend large amounts of money on lobbying and political campaigns, and employ hundreds of lobbyists, to obstruct and delay government action to address climate change. The fossil fuel lobby has considerable clout in Washington, D.C. and in other political centers, including the European Union and the United Kingdom. Fossil fuel industry interests spend many times as much on advancing their agenda in the halls of power than do ordinary citizens and environmental activists, with the former spending $2 billion in the years 2000–2016 on climate change lobbying in the United States. The five largest Big Oil corporations spent hundreds of millions of euros to lobby for its agenda in Brussels. Big Oil companies often adopt "sustainability principles" that are at odds with the policy agenda their lobbyists advocate, which often entails sowing doubt about the reality and impacts of climate change and forestalling government efforts to address them. API launched a public relations disinformation campaign with the aim of creating doubt in the public mind so that "climate change becomes a non-issue." This industry also spends lavishly on American political campaigns, with approximately 2/3 of its political contributions over the past several decades fueling Republican Party politicians, and outspending many-fold political contributions from renewable energy advocates. Fossil fuel industry political contributions reward politicians who vote against environmental protections. According to a study published by the Proceedings of the National Academy of Sciences of the United States of America, as voting by a member of United States Congress turned more anti-environment, as measured by his/her voting record as scored by the League of Conservation Voters (LCV), the fossil fuel industry contributions that this member of Congress received increased. On average, a 10% decrease in the LCV score was correlated with an increase of $1,700 in campaign contributions from the fossil fuel industry for the campaign following the Congressional term.

==== Suppression of climate science ====
Big Oil companies, starting as early as the 1970s, suppressed their own scientists' reports of major climate impacts of the combustion of fossil fuels. ExxonMobil launched a corporate propaganda campaign promoting false information about the issue of climate change, a tactic that has been compared to Big Tobacco's public relations efforts to hoodwink the public about the dangers of smoking. Fossil fuel industry-funded think tanks harassed climate scientists who were publicly discussing the dire threat of climate change. As early as the 1980s when larger segments of the American public began to become aware of the climate change issue, the administrations of some United States presidents scorned scientists who spoke publicly of the threat fossil fuels posed for the climate. Other U.S. administrations have silenced climate scientists and muzzled government whistleblowers. Political appointees at a number of federal agencies prevented scientists from reporting their findings regarding aspects of the climate crisis, changed data modeling to arrive at conclusions they had set out a prior to prove, and shut out the input of career scientists of the agencies.

==== Targeting of climate activists ====
Climate and environmental activists, including, increasingly, those defending woodlands against the logging industry, have been killed in several countries, such as Colombia, Brazil and the Philippines. The perpetrators of most such killings have not been punished. A record number of such killings was recorded for the year 2019. Indigenous environmental activists are disproportionately targeted, comprising as many as 40% of fatalities worldwide. Domestic intelligence services of several governments, such as those of the U.S. government, have targeted environmental activists and climate change organizations as "domestic terrorists," surveilling them, investigating them, questioning them, and placing them on national "watchlists" that could make it more difficult for them to board airplanes and could instigate local law enforcement monitoring. Other U.S. tactics have included preventing media coverage of American citizen assemblies and protests against climate change, and partnering with private security companies to monitor activists.

==== Doomism ====
In the context of climate change politics, doomism refers to pessimistic narratives that claim that it is now too late to do anything about climate change. Doomism can include exaggeration of the probability of cascading climate tipping points, and their likelihood in triggering runaway global heating beyond human ability to control, even if humanity was able to immediately stop all burning of fossil fuels. In the US, polls found that for people who did not support further action to limit global warming, a belief that it is too late to do so was given as a more common reason than skepticism about man made climate change.

==== Lack of compromise ====
Several climate friendly policies have been blocked in the legislative process by environmental and/or left leaning pressure groups and parties. For example, in 2009, the Australian green party voted against the Carbon Pollution Reduction Scheme, as they felt it did not impose a high enough carbon price. In the US, the Sierra Club helped defeat a 2016 climate tax bill which they saw as lacking in social justice. Some of the attempts to impose a carbon price in US states have been blocked by left wing politicians because they were to be implemented by a cap and trade mechanism, rather than a tax.

==== Multi-sector governance ====
The issue of climate change usually fits into various sectors, which means that the integration of climate change policies into other policy areas is frequently called for. Thus the problem is difficult, as it needs to be addressed at multiple scales with diverse actors involved in the complex governance process.

==== Maladaptation ====
Successful adaptation to climate change requires balancing competing economic, social, and political interests. In the absence of such balancing, harmful unintended consequences can undo the benefits of adaptation initiatives. For example, efforts to protect coral reefs in Tanzania forced local villagers to shift from traditional fishing activities to farming that produced higher greenhouse gas emissions.

==== Wars and tensions ====
"Conflict sensitivity and peacebuilding" are a "key for climate policy-making." Wars and geopolitical tensions harm climate action, including by preventing just distribution of needed resources. Climate change can increase conflicts, creating a vicious cycle. The war in Ukraine seriously disturbed climate action. Military forces are responsible for 5.5% of global emissions and wars diverte resources from climate action. On the other hand, climate policy itself can also function as an arena for positive competition among states engaged in a race to the top.

=== Technology ===
The promise of technology is seen as both a threat and a potential boon. New technologies can open up possibilities for new and more effective climate policies. Most models that indicate a path to limiting warming to 2 °C have a big role for carbon dioxide removal, one of the approaches of climate change mitigation. Commentators from across the political spectrum tend to welcome CO_{2} removal. But some are skeptical that it will be ever be able to remove enough CO_{2} to slow global warming without there also being rapid cuts in emissions, and they warn that too much optimism about such technology may make it harder for mitigation policies to be enacted.

Solar radiation management is another technology aiming to reduce global warming. At least with stratospheric aerosol injection, there is broad agreement that it would be effective in bringing down average global temperatures. Yet the prospect is considered unwelcome by many climate scientists. They warn that side effects would include possible reductions in agricultural yields due to reduced sunlight and rainfall, and possible localized temperature rises and other weather disruptions. According to Michael Mann, the prospect of using solar management to reduce temperatures is another argument used to reduce willingness to enact emissions reduction policy.

== Just transition ==
Economic disruption due to phase out of carbon-intensive activities, such as coal mining, cattle farming or bottom trawling, can be politically sensitive due to the high political profile of coal miners, farmers and fishers in some countries. Many labor and environmental groups advocate for a just transition that minimizes the harm and maximizes the benefits associated with climate-related changes to society, for example by providing job training.

== Different responses on the political spectrum ==
Democrats (blue) and Republicans (red) differ in views of the seriousness of addressing climate change, with the gap widening since the late 2010s mainly through Democrats' share increasing.

The sharp divide over the existence of and responsibility for global warming and climate change falls largely along political lines. Overall, 60% of Americans surveyed said oil and gas companies were "completely or mostly responsible" for climate change.

Educated and uneducated Republicans are almost equally likely to think that climate change is not human caused. Whereas opinions favoring becoming carbon neutral declined substantially with age among Republicans, but not among Democrats.

A broad range of policies to reduce greenhouse gas emissions has been proposed, but public support differs consistently along party lines.

National political divides on the seriousness of climate change consistently correlate with political ideology, with right-wing opinion being more negative.

Climate friendly policies are generally supported across the political spectrum, though there have been many exceptions among voters and politicians leaning towards the right, and even politicians on the left have rarely made addressing climate change a top priority. In the 20th century, right wing politicians led much significant action against climate change, both internationally and domestically, with Richard Nixon and Margaret Thatcher being prominent examples. Yet by the 1990s, especially in some English speaking countries and most especially in the US, the issue began to be polarized. Right wing media started arguing that climate change was being invented or at least exaggerated by the left to justify an expansion in the size of government. (Note: Much media coverage on these lines was paid for by the fossil fuel industry, with Koch, Inc. one of the more prominent companies involved. In the early 2010s, the Koch brothers pushed for taxes on households with solar panels selling excess energy back to the Grid, leading Michael Mann to suggest that preference for small government may not have been their primary motivation. See Mann (2021) Chpt 6, p. 124-127) As of 2020, some right wing governments have enacted increased climate friendly policies. Various surveys indicated a slight trend for even U.S. right wing voters to become less skeptical of global warming, and groups like American Conservation Coalition indicate young Republican voters embrace climate as a central policy field. Though in the view of Anatol Lieven, for some right wing US voters, being skeptical of climate change has become part of their identity, so their position on the matter cannot easily be shifted by rational argument.

A 2014 study from the University of Dortmund concluded that countries with center and left-wing governments had higher emission reductions than right-wing governments in OECD countries during 1992–2008. Historically, nationalist governments have been among the worst performers in enacting policies. Though according to Lieven, as climate change is increasingly seen as a threat to the ongoing existence of nation states, nationalism is likely to become one of the most effective forces to drive determined mitigation efforts. The growing trend to securitize the climate change threat may be especially effective for increasing support among nationalist and conservatives.

A 2024 analysis found 100 U.S. representatives and 23 U.S. senators—23% of the 535 members of Congress—to be climate change deniers, all the deniers being Republicans.

== History ==
The history of climate change policy and politics refers to the continuing history of political actions, policies, trends, controversies and activist efforts as they pertain to the issue of climate change. Climate change emerged as a political issue in the 1970s, when activist and formal efforts sought to address environmental crises on a global scale. International policy regarding climate change has focused on cooperation and the establishment of international guidelines to address global warming. The United Nations Framework Convention on Climate Change (UNFCCC) is a largely accepted international agreement that has continuously developed to meet new challenges. Domestic policy on climate change has focused on both establishing internal measures to reduce greenhouse gas emissions and incorporating international guidelines into domestic law.

In the 21st century, there has been a shift towards vulnerability-based policy for those most impacted by environmental anomalies. Over the history of climate policy, concerns have been raised about the treatment of developing nations. Critical reflection on the history of climate change politics provides "ways to think about one of the most difficult issues we human beings have brought upon ourselves in our short life on the planet".

== Relationship to climate science ==
In the scientific literature, there is an overwhelming consensus that global surface temperatures have increased in recent decades and that the trend is caused primarily by human-induced emissions of greenhouse gases.

The public substantially underestimates the degree of scientific consensus that humans are causing climate change. Studies from 2019 to 2021 found scientific consensus to range from 98.7 to 100%.

The politicization of science in the sense of a manipulation of science for political gains is a part of the political process. It is part of the controversies about intelligent design (compare the Wedge strategy) or Merchants of Doubt, scientists that are under suspicion to willingly obscure findings. e.g. about issues like tobacco smoke, ozone depletion, global warming or acid rain. However, e.g. in case of ozone depletion, global regulation based on the Montreal Protocol was successful, in a climate of high uncertainty and against strong resistance while in case of climate change, the Kyoto Protocol failed.

While the IPCC process tries to find and orchestrate the findings of global climate change research to shape a worldwide consensus on the matter it has itself been the object of a strong politicization. Anthropogenic climate change evolved from a mere science issue to a top global policy topic.

The IPCC process having built a broad science consensus does not stop governments following different, if not opposing goals. For ozone depletion, global regulation was already being put into place before a scientific consensus was established. So a linear model of policy-making, based on a the more knowledge we have, the better the political response will be view is not necessarily accurate. Instead knowledge policy, successfully managing knowledge and uncertainties as a foundation for political decision making; requires a better understanding of the relation between science, public (lack of) understanding and policy.

Most of the policy debate concerning climate change mitigation has been framed by projections for the twenty-first century. Academics have criticized this as short term thinking, as decisions made in the next few decades will have environmental consequences that will last for many millennia.

It has been estimated that only 0.12% of all funding for climate-related research is spent on the social science of climate change mitigation. Vastly more funding is spent on natural science studies of climate change and considerable sums are also spent on studies of the impact of and adaptation to climate change. It has been argued that this is a misallocation of resources, as the most urgent challenge is to work out how to change human behavior to mitigate climate change, whereas the natural science of climate change is already well established and there will be decades and centuries to handle adaptation.

== Political economy of climate change ==
Political economy of climate change is an approach that applies the political economy thinking concerning social and political processes to study the critical issues surrounding decision-making on climate change.

The ever-increasing awareness and urgency of climate change had led scholars to explore a better understanding of the multiple causes and influencing factors that affect climate change negotiation, and to seek more effective solutions to tackle climate change. Analyzing these complex issues from a political economy perspective helps to explain the interactions between different stakeholders in response to climate change impacts, and provides opportunities to achieve better implementation of climate change policies.

=== Introduction ===
==== Background ====
Climate change has become one of the most pressing environmental concerns and global challenges in society today. As the issue rises in prominence the international agenda, researchers from different academic sectors have for long been devoting great efforts to explore effective solutions to climate change. Technologists and planners have been devising ways of mitigating and adapting to climate change; economists estimating the cost of climate change and the cost of tackling it; development experts exploring the impact of climate change on social services and public goods. However, Cammack (2007) points out two problems with many of the above discussions, namely the disconnection between the proposed solutions to climate change from different disciplines; and the devoid of politics in addressing climate change at the local level. Further, the issue of climate change is facing various other challenges, such as the problem of elite-resource capture, the resource constraints in developing countries and the conflicts that frequently result from such constraints, which have often been less concerned and stressed in suggested solutions. In recognition of these problems, it is advocated that "understanding the political economy of climate change is vital to tackling it".

Meanwhile, the unequal distribution of the impacts of climate change and the resulting inequity and unfairness on the poor who contribute least to the problem have linked the issue of climate change with development study, which has given rise to various programs and policies that aim at addressing climate change and promoting development. Although great efforts have been made on international negotiations concerning the issue of climate change, it is argued that much of the theory, debate, evidence-gathering and implementation linking climate change and development assume a largely apolitical and linear policy process. In this context, Tanner and Allouche (2011) suggest that climate change initiatives must explicitly recognize the political economy of their inputs, processes and outcomes so as to find a balance between effectiveness, efficiency and equity.

==== Definition ====
In its earliest manifestations, the term "political economy" was basically a synonym of economics, while it is now a rather elusive term that typically refers to the study of the collective or political processes through which public economic decisions are made. In the climate change domain, Tanner and Allouche (2011) define the political economy as "the processes by which ideas, power and resources are conceptualized, negotiated and implemented by different groups at different scales". While there have emerged a substantial literature on the political economy of environmental policy, which explains the "political failure" of the environmental programmes to efficiently and effectively protect the environment, systematic analysis on the specific issue of climate change using the political economy framework is relatively limited.

=== Characteristics of climate change ===
The urgent need to consider and understand the political economy of climate change is based on the specific characteristics of the problem.

The key issues include:

- The cross-sectoral nature of climate change: The issue of climate change usually fits into various sectors, which means that the integration of climate change policies into other policy areas is frequently called for. Thus the problem is complicated as it needs to be tackled at multiple scales, with diverse actors involved in the complex governance process. The interaction of these facets leads to political processes with multiple and overlapping conceptualizations, negotiation and governance issues, which requires the understanding of political economy processes.
- The problematic perception of climate change as simply a "global" issue: Climate change initiatives and governance approaches have tended to be driven from a global scale. While the development of international agreements has witnessed a progressive step of global political action, this globally-led governance of climate change issue may be unable to provide adequate flexibility for specific national or sub-national conditions. Besides, from the development point of view, the issue of equity and global environmental justice would require a fair international regime within which the impact of climate change and poverty could be simultaneously prevented. In this context, climate change is not only a global crisis that needs the presence of international politics, but also a challenge for national or sub-national governments. The understanding of the political economy of climate change could explain the formulation and translation of international initiatives to specific national and sub-national policy context, which provides an important perspective to tackle climate change and achieve environmental justice.
- The growth of climate change finance: Recent years have witnessed a growing number of financial flows and the development of financing mechanisms in the climate change arena. The 2010 United Nations Climate Change Conference in Cancún, Mexico committed a significant amount of money from developed countries to developing a world in supportive of the adaptation and mitigation technologies. In short terms, the fast start finance will be transferred through various channels including bilateral and multilateral official development assistance, the Global Environment Facility, and the UNFCCC. Besides, a growing number of public funds have provided greater incentives to tackle climate change in developing countries. For instance, the Pilot Program for Climate Resilience aims at creating an integrated and scaled-up approach of climate change adaptation in some low-income countries and preparing for future finance flows. In addition, climate change finance in developing countries could potentially change the traditional aid mechanisms, through the differential interpretations of 'common but differentiated responsibilities' by developing and developed countries. As a result, it is inevitable to change the governance structures so as for developing countries to break the traditional donor-recipient relationships. Within these contexts, the understanding of the political economy processes of financial flows in the climate change arena would be crucial to effectively govern the resource transfer and to tackling climate change.
- Different ideological worldviews of responding to climate change: Nowadays, because of the perception of science as a dominant policy driver, much of the policy prescription and action in climate change arena have concentrated on assumptions around standardized governance and planning systems, linear policy processes, readily transferable technology, economic rationality, and the ability of science and technology to overcome resource gaps. As a result, there tends to be a bias towards technology-led and managerial approaches to address climate change in apolitical terms. Besides, a wide range of different ideological worldviews would lead to a high divergence of the perception of climate change solutions, which also has a great influence on decisions made in response to climate change. Exploring these issues from a political economy perspective provides the opportunity to better understand the "complexity of politic and decision-making processes in tackling climate change, the power relations mediating competing claims over resources, and the contextual conditions for enabling the adoption of technology".
- Unintended negative consequences of adaptation policies that fail to factor in environmental-economic trade-offs: Successful adaptation to climate change requires balancing competing economic, social, and political interests. In the absence of such balancing, harmful unintended consequences can undo the benefits of adaptation initiatives. For example, efforts to protect coral reefs in Tanzania forced local villagers to shift from traditional fishing activities to farming that produced higher greenhouse gas emissions.

=== Socio-political constraints ===
The role of political economy in understanding and tackling climate change is also founded upon the key issues surrounding the domestic socio-political constraints:

- The problems of fragile states: Fragile states—defined as poor performers, conflict and/or post-conflict states—are usually incapable of using the aid for climate change effectively. The issues of power and social equity have exacerbated the climate change impacts, while insufficient attention has been paid to the dysfunction of fragile states. Considering the problems of fragile states, the political economy approach could improve the understanding of the long-standing constraints upon capacity and resilience, through which the problems associated with weak capacity, state-building and conflicts could be better addressed in the context of climate change.
- Informal governance: In many poorly performing states, decision-making around the distribution and use of state resources is driven by informal relations and private incentives rather than formal state institutions that are based on equity and law. This informal governance nature that underlies in the domestic social structures prevents the political systems and structures from rational functioning and thus hinders the effective response towards climate change. Therefore, domestic institutions and incentives are critical to the adoption of reforms.
- The difficulty of social change: Developmental change in underdeveloped countries is painfully slow because of a series of long-term collective problems, including the societies' incapacity of working collectively to improve wellbeing, the lack of technical and social ingenuity, the resistance and rejection to innovation and change. In the context of climate change, these problems significantly hinder the promotion of climate change agenda. Taking a political economy view in the underdeveloped countries could help to understand and create incentives to promote transformation and development, which lays a foundation for the expectation of implementing a climate change adaptation agenda.

=== Research focuses and approaches ===
Brandt and Svendsen (2003) introduce a political economy framework that is based on the political support function model by Hillman (1982) into the analysis of the choice of instruments to control climate change in the European Union policy to implement its Kyoto Protocol target level. In this political economy framework, the climate change policy is determined by the relative strength of stakeholder groups. By examining the different objective of different interest groups, namely industry groups, consumer groups and environmental groups, the authors explain the complex interaction between the choices of an instrument for the EU climate change policy, specifically the shift from the green taxation to a grandfathered permit system.

A report by the Bank for Reconstruction and Development (EBRD) (2011) takes a political economy approach to explain why some countries adopt climate change policies while others do not, specifically among the countries in the transition region. This work analyzes the different political economy aspects of the characteristics of climate change policies so as to understand the likely factors driving climate change mitigation outcomes in many transition countries. The main conclusions are listed below:

- The level of democracy alone is not a major driver of climate change policy adoption, which means that the expectations of contribution to global climate change mitigation are not necessarily limited by the political regime of a given country.
- Public knowledge, shaped by various factors including the threat of climate change in a particular country, the national level of education and existence of free media, is a critical element in climate change policy adoption, as countries with the public more aware of the climate change causes are significantly more likely to adopt climate change policies. The focus should, therefore, be on promoting public awareness of the urgent threat of climate change and prevent information asymmetries in many transition countries.
- The relative strength of the carbon-intensive industry is a major deterrent to the adoption of climate change policies, as it partly accounts for the information asymmetries. However, the carbon-intensive industries often influence government's decision-making on climate change policy, which thus calls for a change of the incentives perceived by these industries and a transition of them to a low-carbon production pattern. Efficient means include the energy price reform and the introduction of international carbon trading mechanisms.
- The competitive edge gained national economies in the transition region in a global economy, where increasing international pressure is put to reduce emissions, would enhance their political regime's domestic legitimacy, which could help to address the inherent economic weaknesses underlying the lack of economic diversification and global economic crisis.

Tanner and Allouche (2011) propose a new conceptual and methodological framework for analyzing the political economy of climate change in their latest work, which focuses on the climate change policy processes and outcomes in terms of ideas, power and resources. The new political economy approach is expected to go beyond the dominant political economy tools formulated by international development agencies to analyze climate change initiatives that have ignored the way that ideas and ideologies determine the policy outcomes (see table). The authors assume that each of the three lenses, namely ideas, power and resources, tends to be predominant at one stage of the policy process of the political economy of climate change, with "ideas and ideologies predominant in the conceptualization phase, power in the negotiation phase and resource, institutional capacity and governance in the implementation phase". It is argued that these elements are critical in the formulation of international climate change initiatives and their translation to national and sub-national policy context.

Comparison between the new and traditional political economy analysis of climate change initiatives
Issue	Dominant approach	New political economy
Policy process	Linear, informed by evidence	Complex, informed by ideology, actors and power relations
Dominant scale	Global and inter-state	Translation of international to national and sub-national level
Climate change science and research	Role of objective science in informing policy	Social construction of science and driving narratives
Scarcity and poverty	Distributional outcomes	Political processes mediating competing claims for resources
Decision-making	Collective action, rational choice and rent-seeking	Ideological drivers and incentives, power relations

== See also ==
- Business action on climate change – Range of activities by businesses relating to climate change
- Climate target – Policy for emissions reductions
- Clean Development Mechanism – UN-run carbon offset scheme
- Energy policy – How a government or business deals with energy
- Environmental policy – Government efforts protecting the natural environment
- Green industrial policy – Strategic government policy
- List of international environmental agreements
- Climate Policy (journal)
