= List of international presidential trips made by Mohamed Muizzu =

Trips made by Mohamed Muizzu as president

This is a list of international presidential trips made by Mohamed Muizzu, the 8th and current President of the Maldives, since he assumed the presidency on 17 November 2023.

As of November 2026, Mohamed Muizzu has made 34 trips to 17 countries.

World map highlighting countries visited by Mohamed Muizzu during his presidency, as of November 2026 1 visit 2 visits 4 visits 6 visits Maldives

== Summary ==
Number of visits	Country
1 visit (10)	Antigua and Barbuda; Azerbaijan; United States; Estonia; Malaysia; Qatar; Germany; Bangladesh; Sri Lanka; Pakistan
2 visits (4)	Turkey; United Arab Emirates; China; India
4 visits (2)	United Kingdom; Saudi Arabia
6 visits (1)	Singapore

== 2023 ==
#	Country	City/Cities visited	Dates	Details
1	Turkey	Ankara	26–30 November	State visit, at the invitation of President Recep Tayyip Erdoğan. He was accompanied by wife, Sajidha Mohamed and Government officials.
1	United Arab Emirates	Dubai	30 November – 2 December	Working visit, Muizzu departed in Dubai for the 2023 United Nations Climate Change Conference. He delivered a National Statement at the High-level Segment of the COP28, Muizzu outlined the Maldives' expectations for COP28, emphasizing the importance of the Global Stocktake committing to a strategy that corrects the course towards a 1.5-degree trajectory in accordance with the Paris Agreement.

== 2024 ==
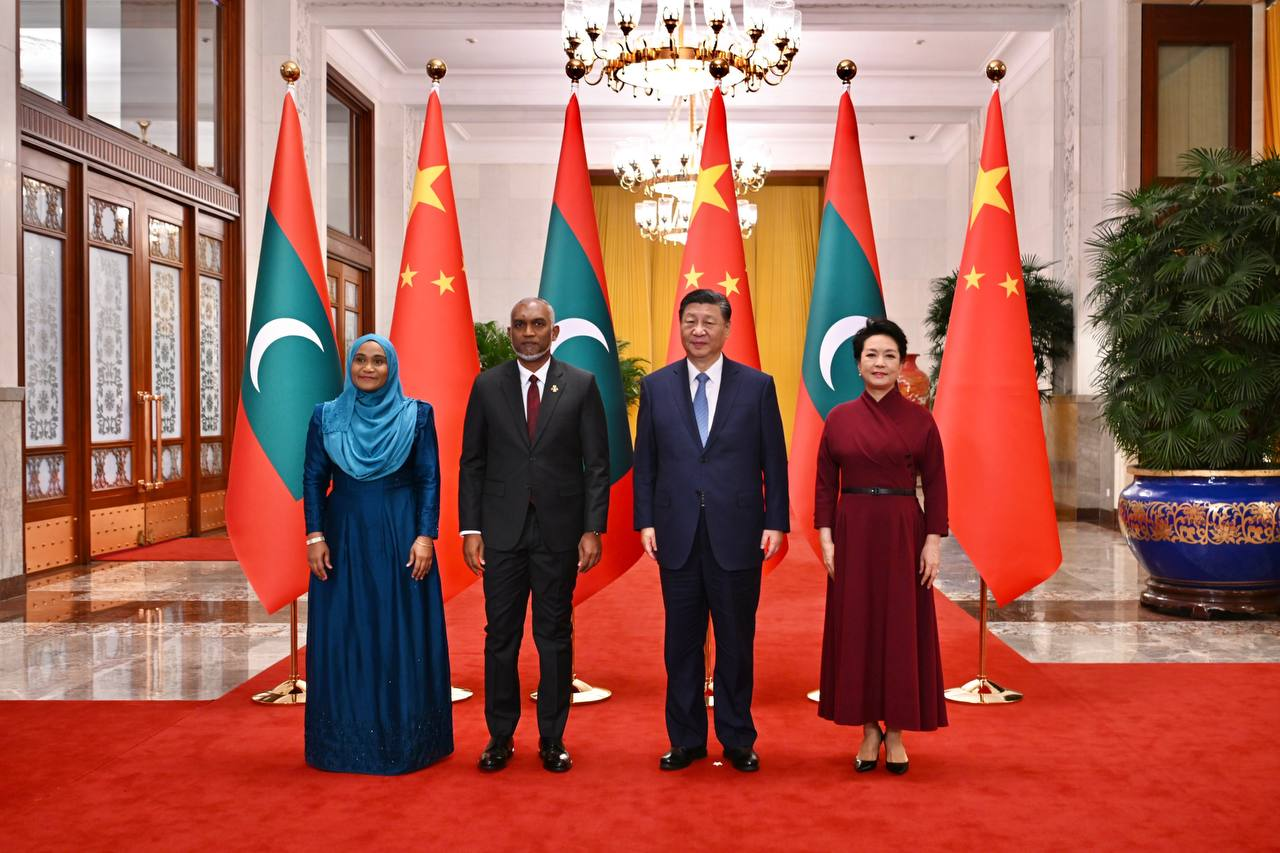
Mohamed Muizzu and Sajidha Mohamed with Xi Jinping and Peng Liyuan

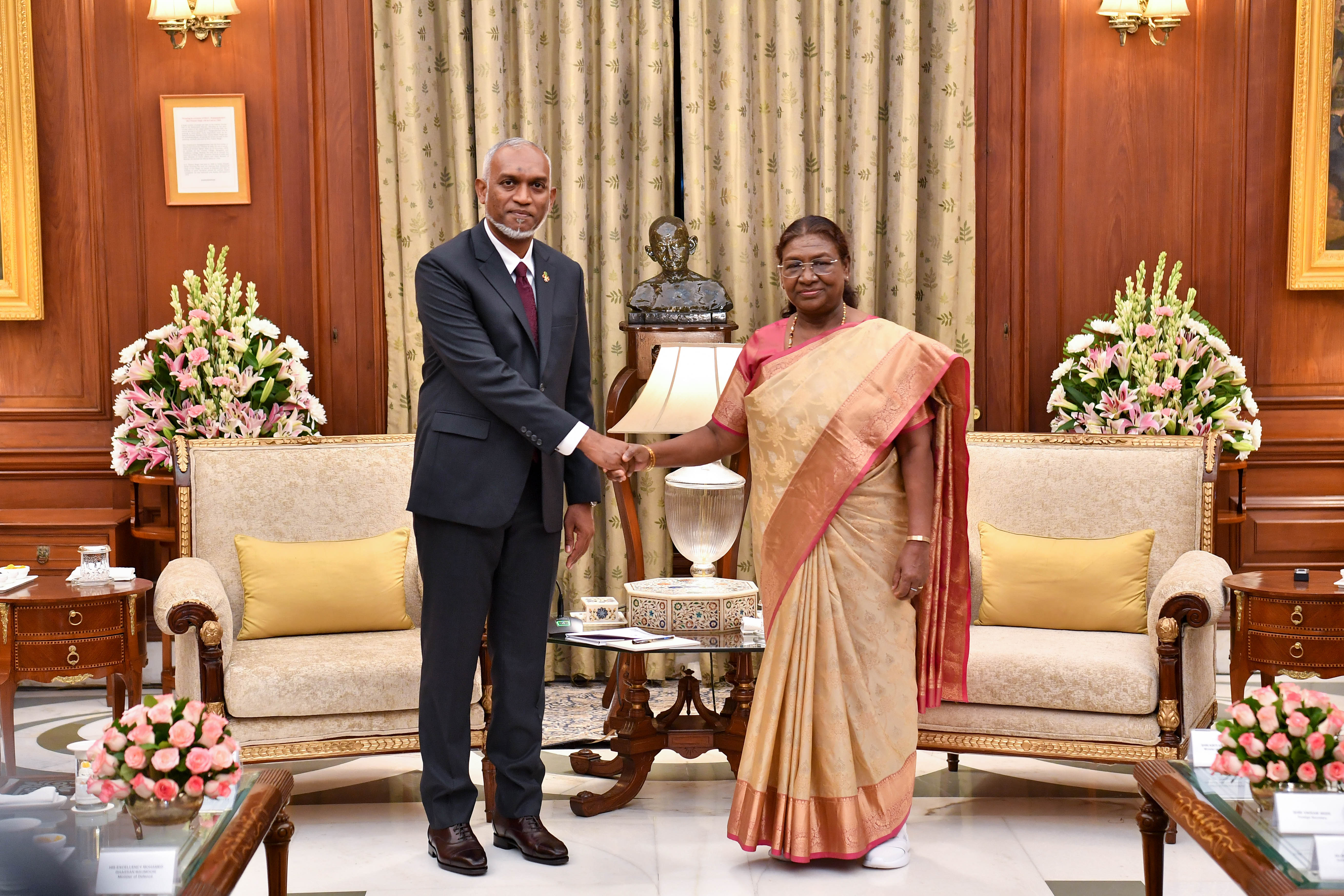
Mohamed Muizzu with Droupadi Murmu

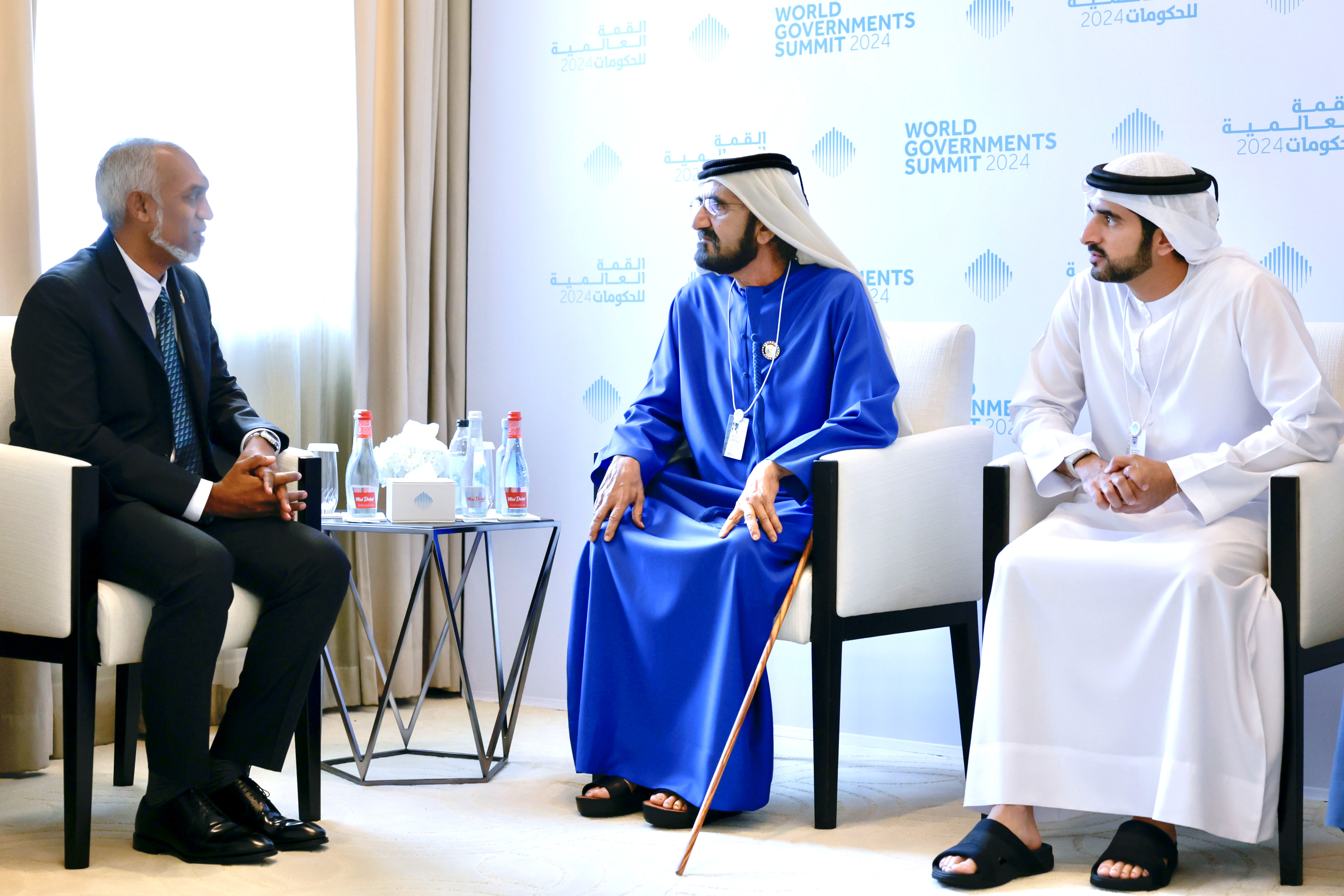
Mohamed Muizzu with Mohammed bin Rashid Al Maktoum and Hamdan bin Mohammed Al Maktoum

#	Country	City/Cities visited	Dates	Details
2	China	Beijing	7–13 January	State Visit, following an invitation from the President of China, His Excellency Xi Jinping, President of China.
3	United Arab Emirates	Dubai	11–15 February	Working visit, to attend the World Governments Summit 2024, at the invitation of Sheikh Mohammed bin Rashid Al Maktoum, Ruler of Dubai.
4	Singapore	Singapore	21–23 March	Unofficial visit
5	Singapore	Singapore	30 April – 5 May	Unofficial visit
6	Saudi Arabia	Makkah; Madinah	10–15 May	Official visit, to perform Umrah with the hospitality of King Salman bin Abdulaziz Al Saud of Saudi Arabia. He was accompanied by Mohamed Shaheem Ali Saeed, Sheikh Mohamed Latheef, Chief of Staff, Abdulla Fayaz, Ali Arif and Abdulla Nasir.
7	Antigua and Barbuda	St. John's	25–31 May	Working visit, to attend the Small Island Developing States (SIDS), held in St. John's, Antigua and Barbuda. He also co-chaired the conference, called on the international community to honour its past commitments and meet Small Island Developing States's tailored financing needs.
8	India	New Delhi	9–11 June	State Visit, after accepting the invitation from Prime Minister Narendra Modi, to the third swearing in ceremony of the Prime Minister and Council of Ministers of India. This visit is Muizzu's first state visit to India since his Inauguration in November 2023.
9	Singapore	Singapore	26–28 August	Unofficial visit for medical purposes.
10	United States	New York City, Trenton, New Jersey	20–29 September	Official visit, to attend the Seventy-ninth session of the United Nations General Assembly, delivered speech to the GA and will meet world leaders, and co-chair 2024 Summit of the Future.
11	India	New Delhi; Mumbai; Agra; Bangalore	6–10 October	State visit; First bilateral visit to India.
12	Saudi Arabia	Riyadh	11–12 November	Arab-Islamic summit 2024.
13	Azerbaijan	Baku	12–15 November	2024 United Nations Climate Change Conference.
14	United Kingdom	London	20–29 November	Unofficial visit.

== 2025 ==
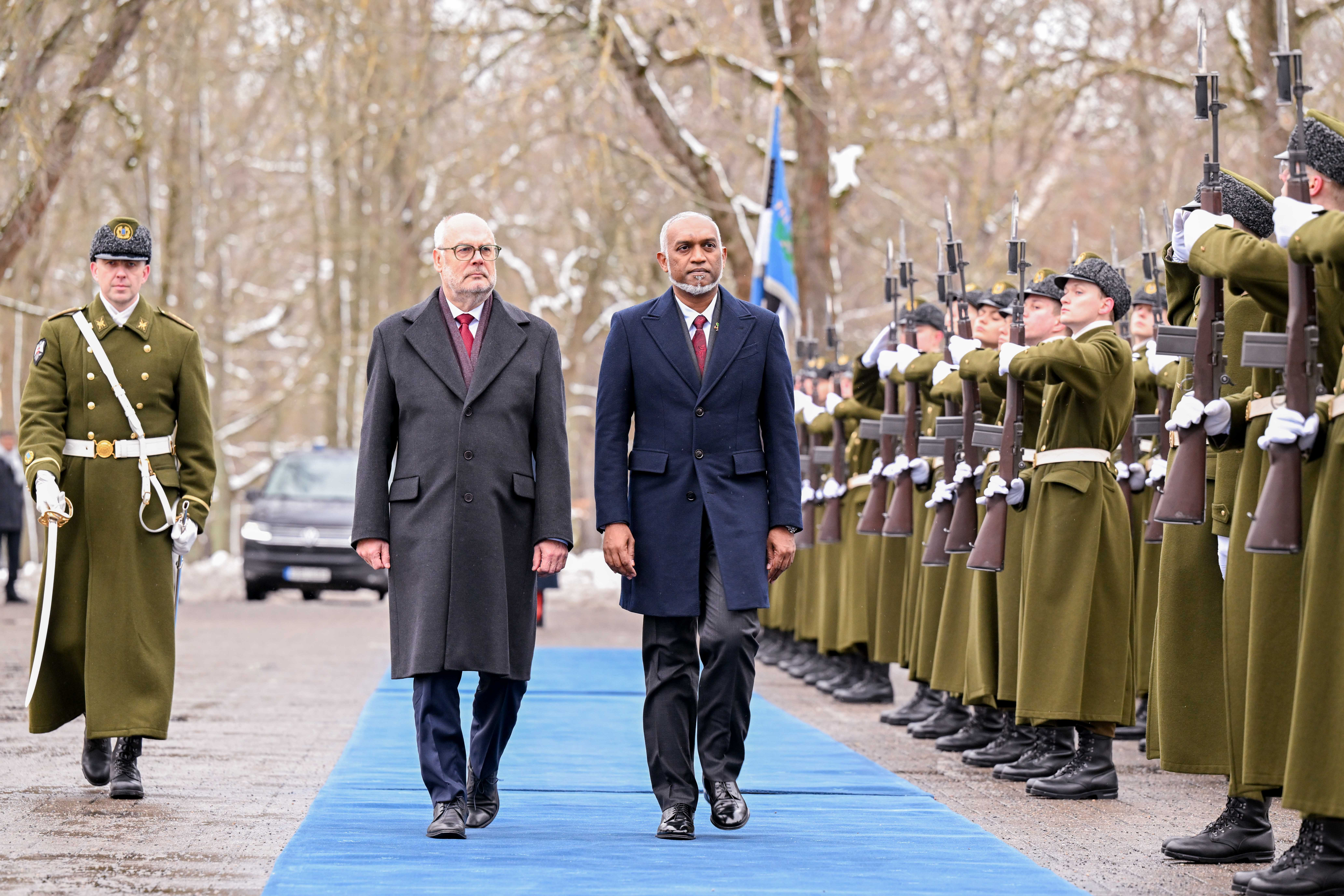
Mohamed Muizzu with President Alar Karis

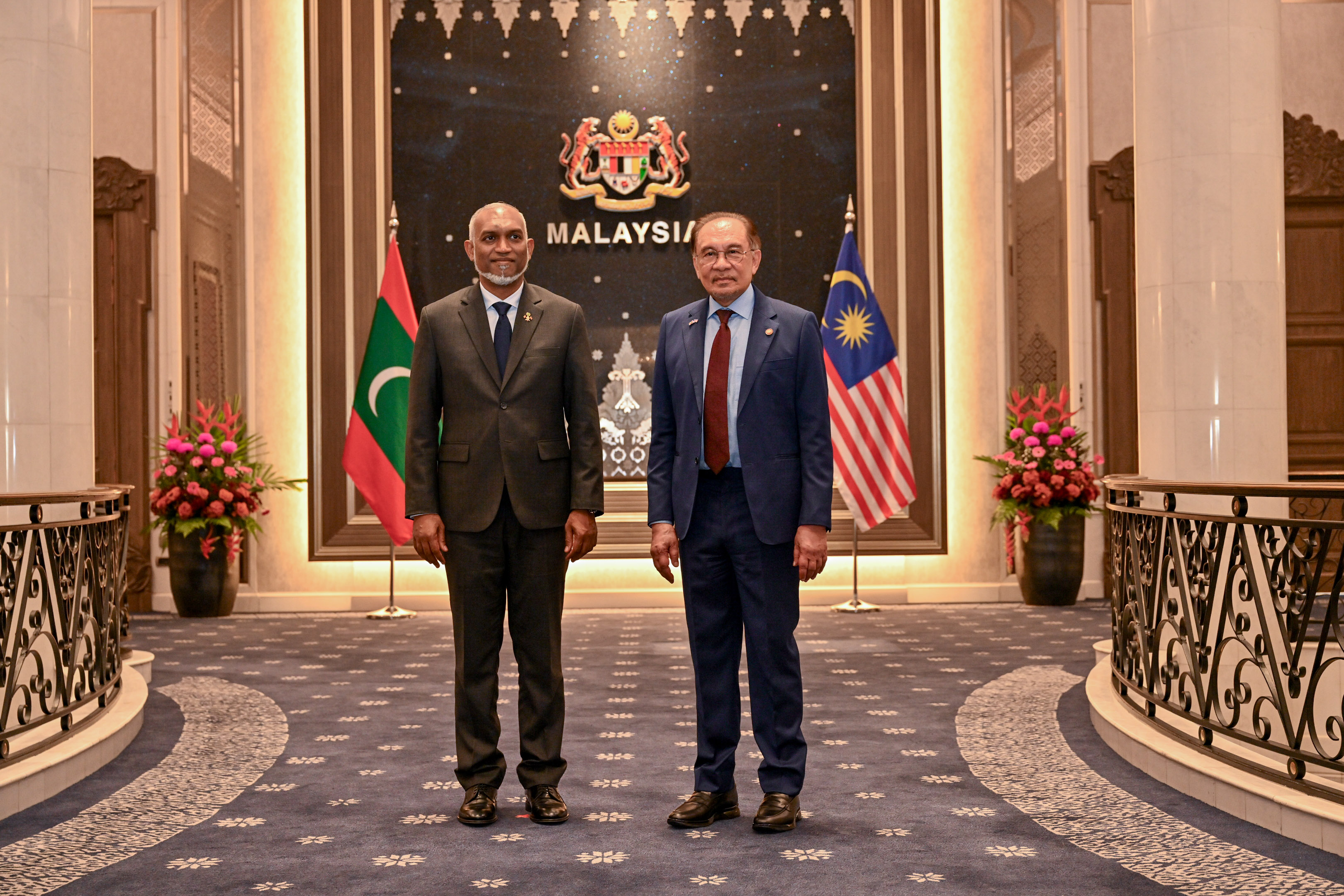
Mohamed Muizzu with Prime Minister Anwar Ibrahim

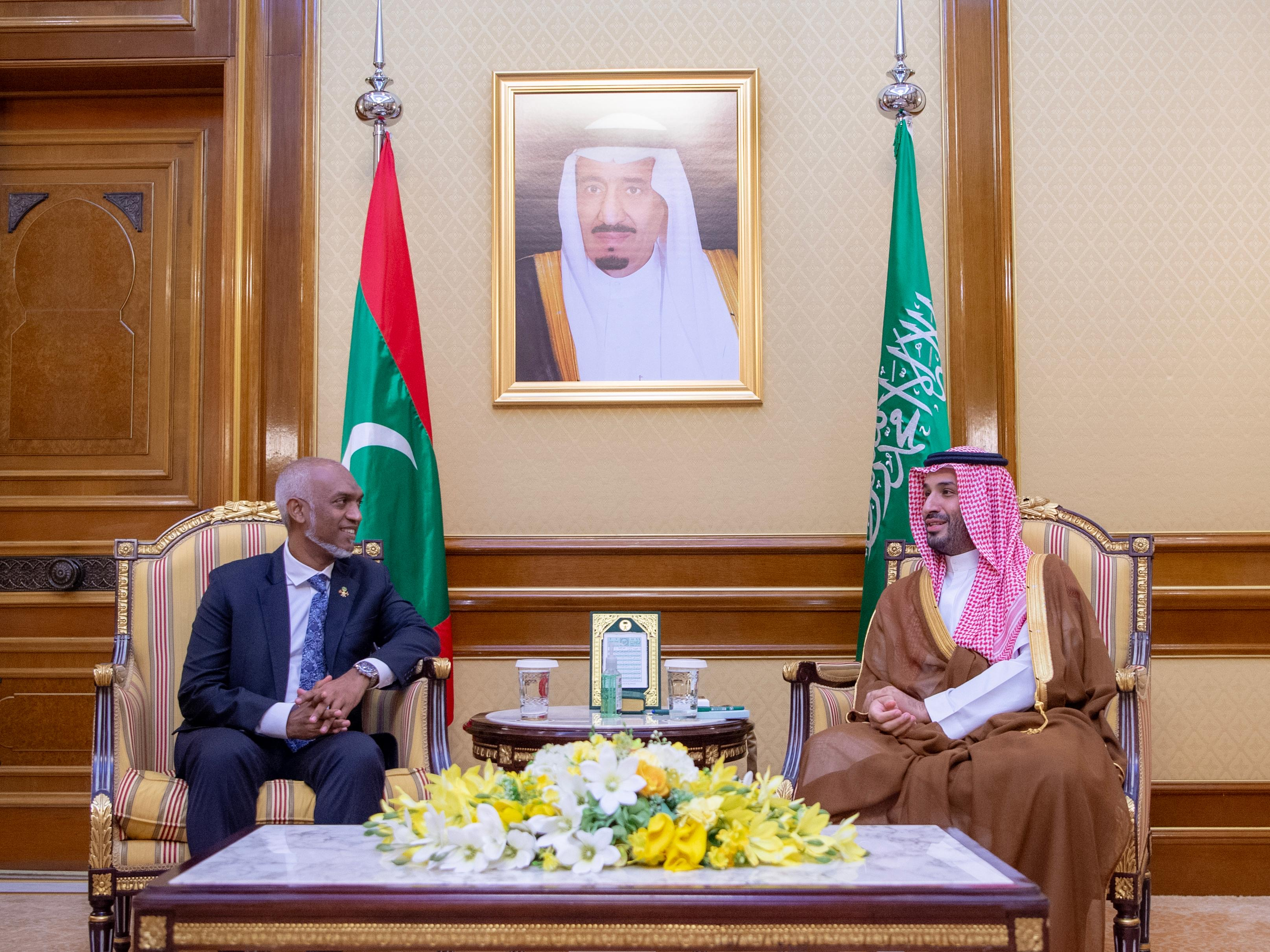
Mohamed Muizzu with Crown Prince Mohammed bin Salman

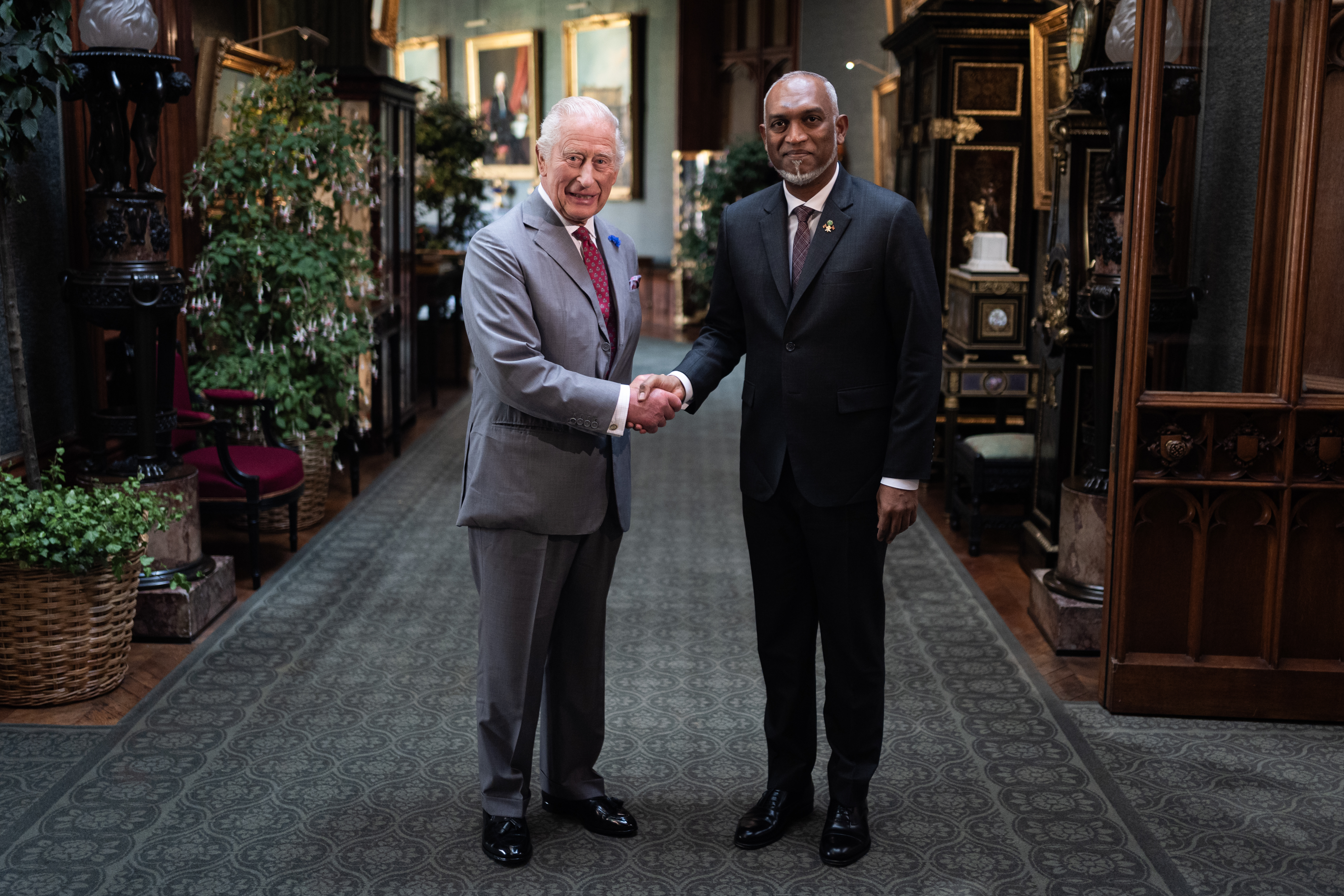
Mohamed Muizzu with King Charles III

#	Country	City/Cities visited	Dates	Details
15	Estonia	Tallinn; Tartu	13–16 January	Official visit at the invitation of Estonian president, Alar Karis.
16	United Kingdom	Liverpool; Leeds	1–5 April	Official visit to promote Maldivian tourism, meeting Maldivian students in the UK and visiting AXA Training Centre in Liverpool. Visiting the University of Leeds, Leeds Town Hall, and meeting with the Councilor of Leeds.
17	Malaysia	Kuala Lumpur; Putrajaya	27–30 April	State visit at the invitation of Malaysian prime minister, Anwar Ibrahim. He witnessed the exchange of MoU's and EoN's between Malaysia and Maldives and received an honorary degree from the International Islamic University Malaysia. He also delivered a keynote.
18	Saudi Arabia	Mecca	1–9 June	Went to perform Hajj.
19	Singapore	Singapore	29 June–2 July	State visit, where he met with the Singaporean Prime Minister Lawrence Wong, attending a state banquet, witnessed the signing of agreements, visited the Tuas Port, ITE College Central, the Urban Redevelopment Authority, as well as Maldivians living in the country. He conferred recognition awards for individuals that strengthened bilateral relations.
20	United Kingdom	London	15–19 July	Official visit, where he met King Charles III, Commonwealth Secretary-General Shirley Ayorkor Botchwey, Speaker of the House of Commons Lindsay Hoyle, the All-party parliamentary group on the Maldives, the Foreign Secretary David Lammy. He also attended the Maldives–UK Business forum.
21	Singapore	Singapore	31 July–5 August	Unofficial visit.
22	China	Beijing	29 August–4 September	Attending the Shanghai Cooperation Organisation and holding bilateral talks with other foreign leaders.
23	Qatar	Doha	14–16 September	Official visit to attend the 2025 Arab–Islamic extraordinary summit condemning the Israel's airstrike in Qatar.
24	United Kingdom	London	29 November–2 December	To participate in the High-level Briefing on Private Capital Mobilisation at the invitation of King Charles III.

== 2026 ==
#	Country	City/Cities visited	Dates	Details
25	Singapore	Singapore	5 February	Private visit.
26	Germany	Berlin	9–12 February	Official visit at the invitation of German President Frank-Walter Steinmeier. Engaging high level talks with the German government, delivering keynote speeches at Humboldt University of Berlin and the German Council on Foreign Relations.
27	Bangladesh	Dhaka	16–18 February	Official visit by Muhammad Yunus to attend the oath-taking ceremony of Tarique Rahman and the new Bangaldeshi government.
28	Saudi Arabia	Jeddah; Mecca	6–11 April	Performing Umrah; hospitality and expenses borne by the Saudi government.
29	Sri Lanka	Colombo	3–5 May	Official visit at the invitation of Sri Lankan President Anura Kumara Dissanayake. Conducted bilateral discussions and witnessed the signing of several MoUs between Sri Lanka and the Maldives.
30	Singapore		24–30 May	Unofficial visit.
31	Qatar	Doha	13–14 July	Official visit to pay respects to Tamim bin Hamad Al Thani following the death of Hamad bin Khalifa Al Thani.
32	Singapore		26–29 September	Unofficial visit.
33	Pakistan	Islamabad	20–22 October	Official visit on the invitation of Pakistani Prime Minister Shehbaz Sharif.
34	Turkey	Antalya	10–14 November	Official visit to attend the 2026 United Nations Climate Change Conference.

== See also ==
- List of international presidential trips made by Ibrahim Mohamed Solih, his predecessor
