= List of international presidential trips made by Ibrahim Mohamed Solih =

This is a list of presidential international trips made by Ibrahim Mohamed Solih as the 7th president of the Maldives from November 2018 to November 2023.

At the end of his presidential term, Solih has made 43 trips to 14 countries.

Map of international trips made by Ibrahim Mohamed Solih as president: One visit Two visits Three visits Seven to Eight visits Maldives

President Solih's visits by country
Number of visits	Country
1 visit (6)	Mauritius; Seychelles; Japan; Bangladesh; Rwanda; Germany
2 visits (3)	Qatar; Saudi Arabia; United States
3 visits (2)	India; United Kingdom
7 visits (1)	Sri Lanka
8 visits (2)	United Arab Emirates; Singapore

== 2018 ==
#	Country	Areas visited	Date(s)	Notes	Ref
1	India	New Delhi	16–18 December	State visit, Met with Indian prime minister Narendra Modi, Minister of External Affairs, Sushma Swaraj, and Indian President Ram Nath Kovind	

== 2019 ==
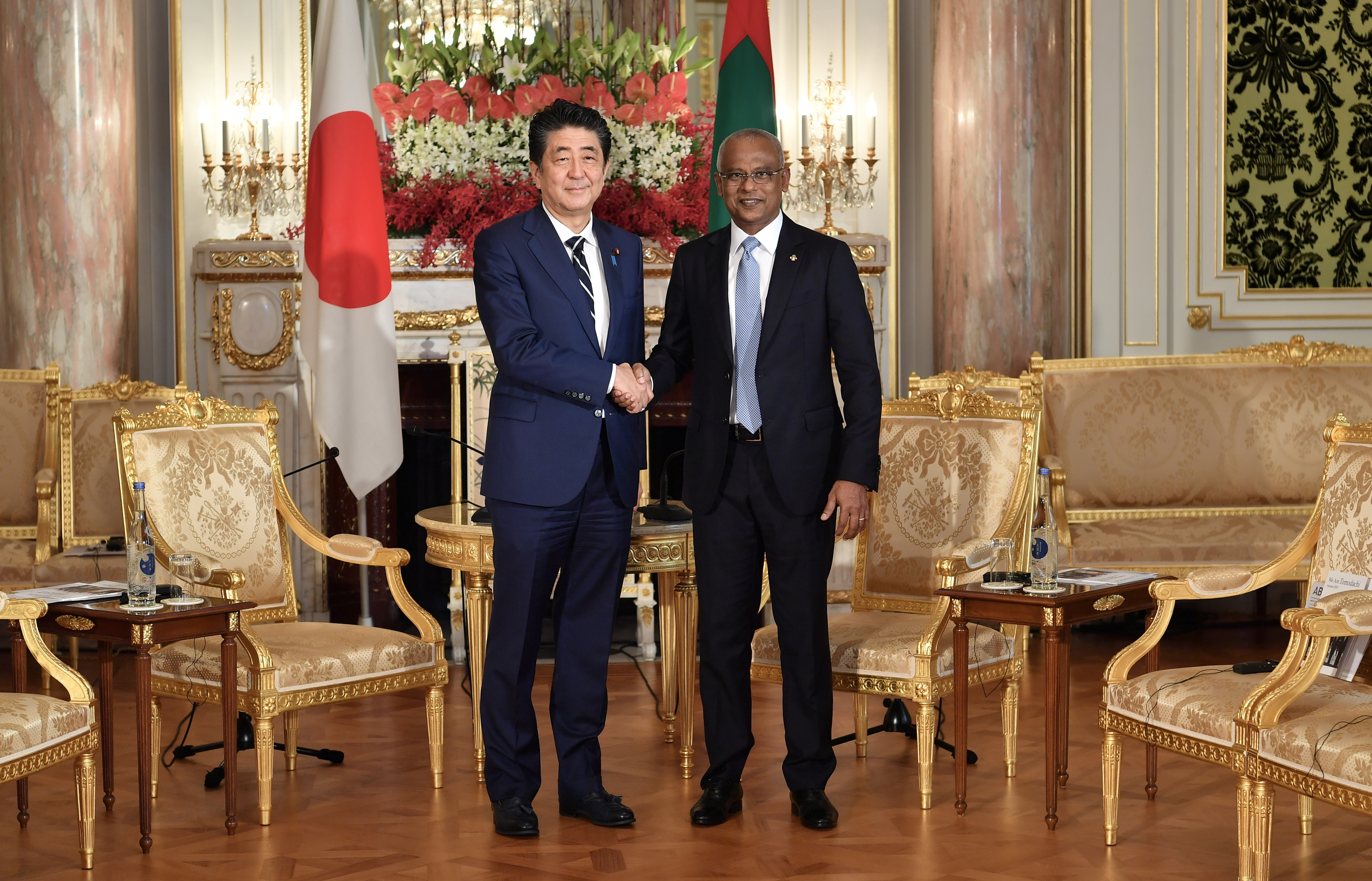
Ibrahim Mohamed Solih with Shinzo Abe

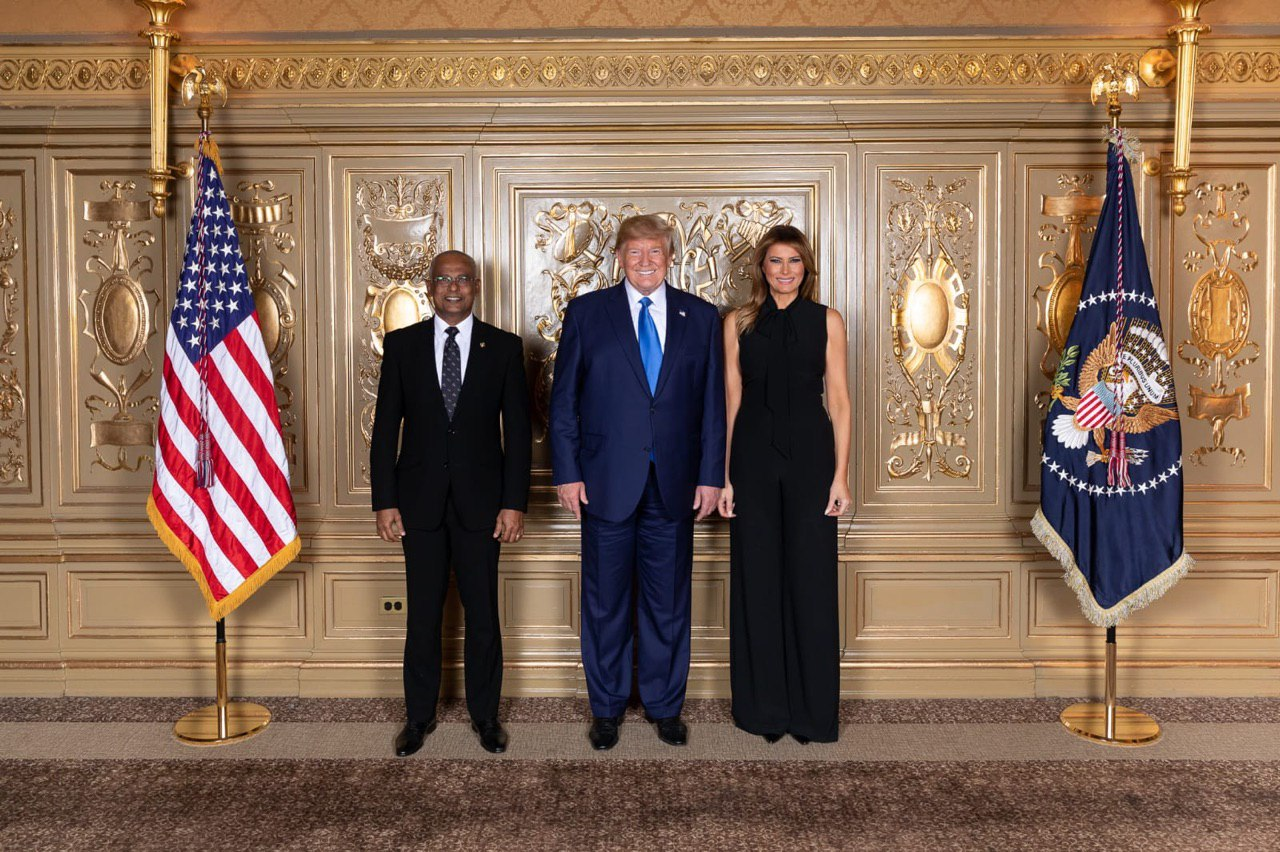
Ibrahim Mohamed Solih with Donald Trump

#	Country	Areas visited	Date(s)	Notes	Ref
2	Sri Lanka	Colombo	3–6 January	Unofficial visit	
3	United Arab Emirates	Abu Dhabi	14–17 January	Official visit at the invitation of the crown prince of Abu Dhabi. met with Mohammed Bin Zayed Al Nahyan, Crown Prince of Abu Dhabi.	
4	Sri Lanka	Colombo	3–5 February	Official visit at the invitation of the President Maithripala Sirisena, as the Guest of Honor of the 71st Independence Day celebrations of Sri Lanka.	
5	Singapore	Singapore	27 February–2 March	Unofficial visit	
6	India	New Delhi	22–23 April	Official visit at the invitation of the Indian government. Met with the Cricket Board of India and held discussions.	
7	Saudi Arabia	Mecca	29–31 May	Working visit, to attend the 14th summit of the Organization of Islamic Cooperation	
8	Singapore	Singapore	29 June–2 July	State visit, met with Prime Minister Lee Hsien Loong and President Halimah Yacob	
9	Mauritius	Port Louis	19–22 July	Official visit at the invitation by the Mauritian government and working visit to attend 10th edition of the Indian Ocean Island Games	
10	Seychelles	Victoria	2–4 August	State visit, at the invitation by the President and the Vice President of Seychelles. Met with President Danny Faure	
11	Sri Lanka	Colombo	14–17 August	Unofficial visit	
12	United States	New York City	23–30 September	Working visit, to attend the 74th Session of the United Nations General Assembly. Met with President Donald Trump.	
13	Japan	Tokyo	20–26 October	State visit, to attend the Enthronement Ceremony of Emperor Naruhito. Met with the Japanese Prime Minister Shinzo Abe and held discussions	
14	United Arab Emirates	Abu Dhabi	29 November–2 December	Official visit at the invitation of the crown prince of Abu Dhabi. Met with Mohammed Bin Zayed Al Nahyan	
15	Sri Lanka	Colombo	31 December–4 January 2020	Unofficial visit	

== 2020 ==
President Ibrahim Mohamed Solih didn't make any international trips due to the COVID-19 pandemic.

== 2021 ==
#	Country	Areas visited	Date(s)	Notes	Ref
16	United Arab Emirates	Abu Dhabi	3–6 January	Unofficial visit. Met with the crown prince of Abu Dhabi	
17	Qatar	Doha	14–15 March	Official Visit. Met with Sheikh Tamim Bin Hamad Al Thani, Amir of Qatar	
18	Bangladesh	Dhaka	15–18 March	State visit, met with Prime Minister Hasina, President and A. K. Abdul Momen, the Minister of Foreign Affairs	
19	United Arab Emirates	Dubai	21–23 June	Unofficial visit	
20	Sri Lanka	Colombo	20–23 July	Unofficial visit	
21	United Arab Emirates	Dubai	27–31 July	Unofficial visit	
22	United States	New York City	19–28 September	Official working visit. Attended the 76th session of the United Nations General Assembly, and addressed to the UNGA. Met with the President of the UNGA and Solih's foreign minister Abdulla Shahid	
23	United Arab Emirates	Dubai	25–30 October	Official visit to attend the Expo 2020	
24	United Kingdom	Glasgow, London	31 October–4 November	Working visit, to attend the 2021 United Nations Climate Change Conference. Met with Many world leaders	
25	Sri Lanka	Colombo	8–10 November	Official visit, to honor the opening ceremony of the "2021 Prime Minister Mahinda Rajapaksa Trophy" football tournament. Met with president Gotabaya Rajapaksa	
26	Sri Lanka	Colombo	30 December–2 January	Unofficial visit	

== 2022 ==
#	Country	Areas visited	Date(s)	Notes	Ref
27	United Arab Emirates	Abu Dhabi	16–19 January	Official visit, to attend the Abu Dhabi Sustainability Week. Met with the crown prince of Abu Dhabi	
28	Singapore	Singapore	10–15 February	Unofficial visit	
29	Singapore	Singapore	23 February–6 March	Unofficial visit. In this visit, Solih underwent a Theroid surgery, in which before the surgery he transferred presidential power to Vice president Faisal.	
30	Singapore	Singapore	14–17 April	Unofficial visit	
31	United Arab Emirates	Abu Dhabi	15–16 May	Official visit, to attend the funeral of Khalifa bin Zayed Al Nahyan	
32	Rwanda	Kigali	23–27 June	Working visit, to attend the 2022 Commonwealth Heads of Government Meeting.	
32	Saudi Arabia	Mecca	4–13 July	Unofficial visit, to perform Hajj pilgrimage	
33	India	New Delhi	1–4 August	Official visit at the invitation of prime minister Narendra Modi. Met and held official talks with the President, Prime Minister, Minister of External Affairs of India.	
34	United Kingdom	London	17–22 September	Official visit to attend the Funeral of Queen Elizabeth II.	
35	Bahrain	Manama	5–8 October	State visit at the invitation of King Hamad bin Isa Al Khalifa.	
36	Singapore	Singapore	12–15 October	Unofficial visit	
37	Qatar	Doha	12–15 December	Official visit at the invitation of the Qatari Amir Tamim bin Hamad Al Thani.	

== 2023 ==
#	Country	Areas visited	Date(s)	Notes	Ref
38	Singapore	Singapore	20–26 February	Unofficial visit	
39	Qatar	Doha	4–7 March	Working visit to attend the 5th United Nations Conference on the Least Developed Countries	
40	Germany	Berlin	7–11 March	State visit. Met with president Frank-Walter Steinmeier.	
42	United Kingdom	London	3–8 May	Official and Working visit. Attended the Coronation of Charles III and Camilla. Met with King Charles III.	
43	Singapore	Singapore	15–17 June	Unofficial visit	

== See also ==
- List of international presidential trips made by Mohamed Muizzu, his successor
