= Environmental issues in the United Arab Emirates =

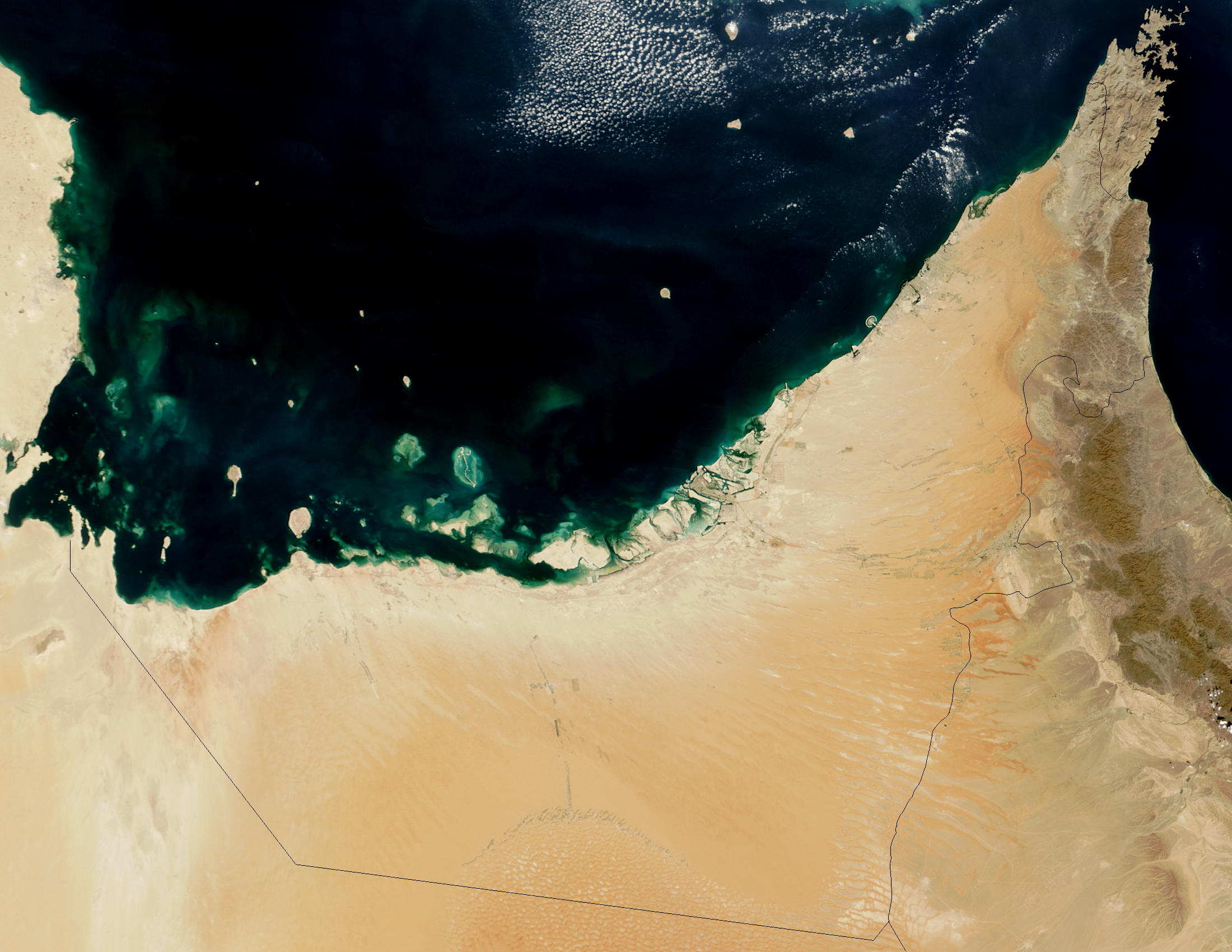
Landscape of United Arab Emirates

Environmental issues in the United Arab Emirates (UAE) are caused by the exploitation of natural resources, rapid population growth, and high energy demand. The continuing temperature rise caused by global warming contributes to UAE's water scarcity, drought, rising sea level, and aridity. The UAE has a hot desert climate, which is very vulnerable to the effects of climate change and contributes to worsening water scarcity, quality, and water contamination.

The UAE is located in the Middle East between Oman and Saudi Arabia, adjoining the Gulf of Oman and the Persian Gulf. In recent years, the impact of global warming on the UAE has intensified the already existing environmental issues, including water scarcity and limited agricultural land. The United Arab Emirates is a contributor to greenhouse gas emissions, listed as having the 28th highest carbon dioxide emissions. Since the boom of the oil industry occurred in the early 21st century, the population and its consumption of energy have sharply increased.

The United Arab Emirates contains the world's seventh largest natural resource of oil and seventeenth-largest natural gas reserve. This possession of a high amount of valuable natural resources pushed the United Arab Emirates to the position of the ninth wealthiest country in the world by 2016 GDP per capita. These financial resources support their adaptation capacity to "climate change-induced challenges". Currently, they are investing in increasing air conditioning infrastructure, rainwater drainage systems, constructing flood barriers and new desalination plants. In June 2016, Abu Dhabi announced a project for an enhanced rainwater drainage system due to unnaturally occurring thunderstorms in March 2016 which caused 860 instances of damage on properties and flooding.

The three main characteristics of the United Arab Emirates' politics contribute to the recent natural unsustainability. First, the Emirates feature components of a rentier state; secondly, it is governed by an authoritarian political system; and finally, both facts cause critical natural resource-related trades. In particular, UAE as a rentier state means that the federation gains external rent from foreign individuals, companies and governments. A rentier state's economy is predominated by the dependency on external rents. Oil revenues also count as external rent.

A 2025 analysis of UAE government strategies found that while national sustainability policies are extensive, they give little specific attention to the environmental impact of managing digital records, such as data storage and e-waste, and recommended involving information management professionals in policy development.

== Issues ==
Notable environmental issues of the United Arab Emirates can be divided into:

- loss of wildlife habitat
- climate change and its effects
- limited agricultural land
- air pollution
- land pollution

=== Historical background ===
The UAE, founded in 1971, is a developing federalization of seven emirates: Abu Dhabi, Ajman, Dubai, Fujairah, Ras al-Khaimah, Sharjah and Umm al-Quwain. The area of the UAE was originally populated by nomadic people and faced only rural development. In the last 40 years the United Arab Emirates, with a population of 9,156,963 residents, have developed to one of the most rapidly growing countries in the world. Their enormous growth is powered by the exploitation of their gas and oil resources with a peak in the 2000s when the Gulf monarchy became dependent on their oil and gas exports. The Gulf monarchy's wealth is almost entirely related to their huge export in fossil fuels, thus they have never been particularly interested in cooperation or negotiation concerning global warming. Since global warming intensified and its impacts on the UAE got worse, they are making important approaches regarding climate change.

In 2005, the UAE signed the Kyoto Protocol to the UN Convention on Climate Change, thus becoming the "green" leader of the major oil-producing countries. The United Arab Emirates, with a focus on their wealthiest emirates Abu Dhabi and Dubai, started their first action concerning climate change by initiating small "green" projects in 2006. For instance, the project Masdar City was the first contribution of Abu Dhabi which addressed global warming through the implementation of natural sustainability in people's daily life, for example using solar energy. Abu Dhabi created a new form of branding by calling itself as a "green" leader and "demonstrate[s] fossil fuel wealth can and will be used to promote clean energy and environmental sustainability initiatives if there is an economic or political motive, as in any other state". Finally, the United Arab Emirates hosted the International Renewable Energy Agency in 2009.

Nowadays, the United Arab Emirates are mainly focused on the economic challenges of the diminishing volume of natural resources while also regulating the stability of imports and exports. That is the reason why UAE decided to ensure energy security with nuclear power as well as renewable energy, in particular, solar energy.

"We have seen impressive solar developments in the UAE this year [2016] with Mohammed Bin Rashid Al Maktoum Solar Park in Dubai, and recently in Abu Dhabi where its planned 350MW solar PV plant in Sweihan received very competitive bids, with the lowest bid offering a new global record low price of 2.42 U.S. US cents/kWh," said Ali Alshafar, Deputy Head of Delegation of the UAE. Alshafar points out the UAE's major development in solar power.

While the UAE extend their renewable energy infrastructure, they are challenged by three main environmental issues: loss of wildlife habitat through urbanization and industrialisation, limited agricultural land caused by the UAE's arid landscape and low precipitation and finally the intensifying effects of climate change like sea level rising and the increasing frequency of dust storms. Especially, their growing population contributes to even worsening the dependency on desalination plants and increasing huge food imports from the main importer, India.

In the future development of the UAE, Luomi predicts that they will continue with overconsumption while applying to enhanced technology. "As long as energy resources and external rent are maintained, the Gulf monarchies will at least, in theory, maintain their capability to sustain their energy-intensive modern lifestyles (with air conditioning and seawater desalination); secure food supply through subsidized local farming and foreign farmland purchases; continue the opulent land manipulation projects; and, generally, keep up a strong state capacity through rent distribution, despite rising temperatures and sea levels."

== Climate change ==
In 2010, the UAE examined, with the support of the Stockholm Environment Institute's US Center, the effects of increasing carbon dioxide emissions and its impact on the weather. The report investigates the effects of climate change on the economy, the infrastructure, the health of citizens and the entire ecosystem. It resulted with a dramatical impact of rising sea levels by affecting 6 percent of its coastal urbanization by the end of the century. The scenario of a one-meter sea level rise would lead to the UAE's loss of 1,155 square kilometers of the country's coast by 2050. Nine meters of sea level rising would flood almost all of Abu Dhabi and Dubai.

=== Effects of climate change ===
==== Rising sea level ====
NASA satellites show sea levels rising at a rate of 3.22 millimeters per year. The UN International Governmental Panel on Climate Change also published a report which shows that the sea levels might peak a level of 0.76 meters in 2100. The calculations for the year 2500 show a rise of 1.8 meters, while other estimates are higher. Specifically in the UAE, reports expect a land loss of 1–6% (1,555– 5,000 km^{2}) by 2100.

"Climate change impacts are very important in this part of the world. Global warming has a huge impact in terms of water scarcity and rising sea levels. Those huge cities and huge buildings are very near the sea," Christian de Perthuis, economist and professor at Paris-Dauphine University and Head of the Climate Economics Chair said. If sea levels continue to rise, "it will be very difficult to protect those cities." The consequences of rising sea levels are economic harm and the relocation of low-lying urbanized cities, for instance the population on the famous Palm Islands, a man-made island in Dubai.

In 2010, The Abu Dhabi Environmental Agency published an announcement which shows that 85% of the UAE's population would be affected by rising sea levels as well as 90 percent of its infrastructure.

==== Dust storms ====
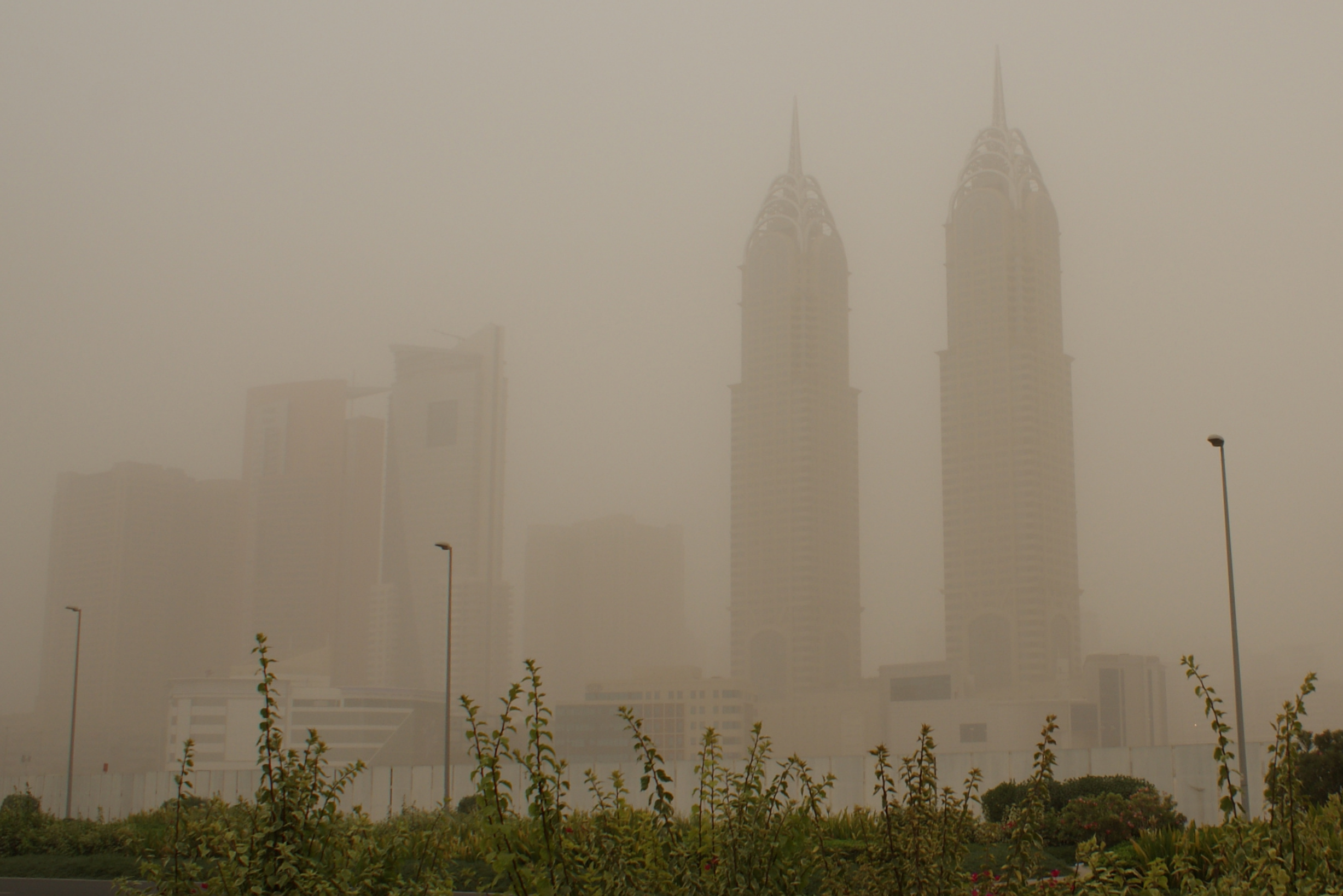
Dust storm in Dubai

Dust storms are caused by wind blowing over the desert. The biology department of the United Arab Emirates University investigated dust storm frequencies and strengths on a 5-year time period, between 2004 and 2009, and have ascertained that climate change effects could be the reason for the resultant of a noticeable shift in the characteristics of dust storms. "The range of mineral compositions of the collected dust samples is consistent with temporally and spatially variable dust sources, associated with changing wind patterns over the Persian Gulf."

The reason for this development is given by rising temperatures which causes less precipitation. The consequence is dehydration of an already dry landscape. The UAE's climate condition of hot temperatures and semi-arid landscape affects also the reaction between industrial pollution and airborne dust different than other places in the world. This reaction might support the correlation between the pollution caused by human consumption and the increasing airborne dust frequency.

"Dust provides surfaces for heterogeneous reactions, it can get compounds, dangerous compounds that we could not see in other places" explained Professor Georgiy Stenchikov at King Abdullah University of Science and Technology in Saudi Arabia. Mr Stenchikov points out that the reaction between dust and man-made pollutants in the desert of the UAE is unique and must still be investigated by scientists. Moreover, it is possible that the effects are even worse than assumed.

For instance, one man-made pollutant produced by the production and the use of iron causes rising levels of dimethyl sulfide (DMS) in the atmosphere. Dimethyl sulfide is responsible for condensation nuclei which are vital for the formation of clouds and precipitation. By oxidation, DMS "will scatter solar radiation effectively with a consequent decrease in global temperature as a climate feedback."

A positive effect of a dust storm is the distribution of mineralogical nutrients which have a good influence on the marine ecosystem.

=== Mitigating climate change ===
The UAE hosted the 2023 United Nations Climate Change Conference. However, the Emirates faced extensive criticism over its human rights restrictions and for appointing the head of an oil company (Abu Dhabi National Oil Company), Sultan Al Jaber, as the President of COP28. Human rights groups condemned Al Jaber's appointment, saying he was incompatible with the role because ADNOC planned to expand its fossil fuel production, causing more damage to the climate.

==== Nuclear power ====
The UAE has developed nuclear power to diversify its energy sources and enhance energy security. The Emirates Nuclear Energy Corporation (ENEC) was established in 2009 to oversee nuclear projects. Construction of the Barakah Nuclear Power Plant, the country’s first nuclear facility, began in 2011 near Al Dhannah and included four reactors. Additional reactors are being developed in partnership with international firms, under strict safety and regulatory standards.

=== Solar Power ===
The Mohammed bin Rashid Al Maktoum Solar Park is UAE's flagship solar energy project. It sets to become the world's largest single-site solar park by 2030 by combing cutting-edge technologies like concentrated solar power (CSP) and photovoltaic panels to generate clean, renewable electricity. With a planned capacity of 5,000 megawatts, the park is reshaping the UAE’s energy future and inspiring global shifts towards clean energy.

=== Adaption to climate change ===
==== Desalination ====
The ongoing industrialization and the boom in the tourism sector have had a high influence on the country's water consumption, which can not be satisfied by natural resources because of the arid landscape and the hot climate in the United Arab Emirates. The growing pressure on politicians shapes the UAE's huge investments in high-level technology in order to supply the growing demand of water consumption.

The UAE requires desalination from the Persian Gulf to meet their groundwater demand. While desalination supports groundwater supplies, it also highly increases energy demand because of its required power to produce 40% to 99% of all drinking water. The Gulf monarchy's desalination pattern reaches high levels on the global scale, by controlling 60% of worldwide constructed desalination plants. The procedure of desalination generates two types of water, water that satisfies drinking water conditions and the second "by-product" contains a concentrated salt level. The by-product is drained into the sea for cost-saving purposes. The consequences are noticeable, with seas becoming "hypersaline", causing a reduction on desalination plants effectivity. The costs of desalination increase simultaneously.

The UAE's wasteful procedures to exploit groundwater have led to a crisis level on fresh water resources. Reports are available, which show a sinking groundwater level of 1 meter per year. The contamination of water aquifer by saltwater contributes to this situation.

Since the 1960s, when the first desalination plant was constructed by Weir Westgarth, the UAE's drinking water supply has always depended on this technology. In the 2014 environment statistics report from the Statistics Centre Abu Dhabi, it demonstrates its sharply increasing water consumption from 667 million cubic meters in 2005 to 1.126 billion cubic meters in 2014.

By 2025 the Arab countries will face serious levels of water scarcity regardless of climate change. Human activities like the construction of dams, unsustainable irrigation practices, and wasteful water overconsumption caused this approaching drought. 80% of Arabs water consumption is used for agriculture.

== Loss of wildlife habitat ==
=== Coastal urbanization ===
In the last 30 years, the United Arab Emirates boom in the oil industry has caused largely urbanized cities like Dubai and Abu Dhabi. Their approach in technology, economic and politics are represented by high-tech innovations, enhanced infrastructure and an established industry with worldwide operating companies. Those conditions shaped the UAE's society and powered the urbanization in their development.

The growing industrial business influenced people from all over the world to settle down in the UAE. Driven by the increasing prosperity, society overconsumes to adapt to the rising living standard. Also, the high demand for cheap labor attracts many migrants.

The urbanization of UAE influences the environment, the social structure, and the economy in this area. Also, the growing tourism sector in this urban environment challenges the country's food, social and energy security. In detail, to provide the growing population with food, the UAE overfishes and overgrazes. The waste is reaching crisis levels while the exploitation of oil and gas comes with wealth but destroys environmental habitat.

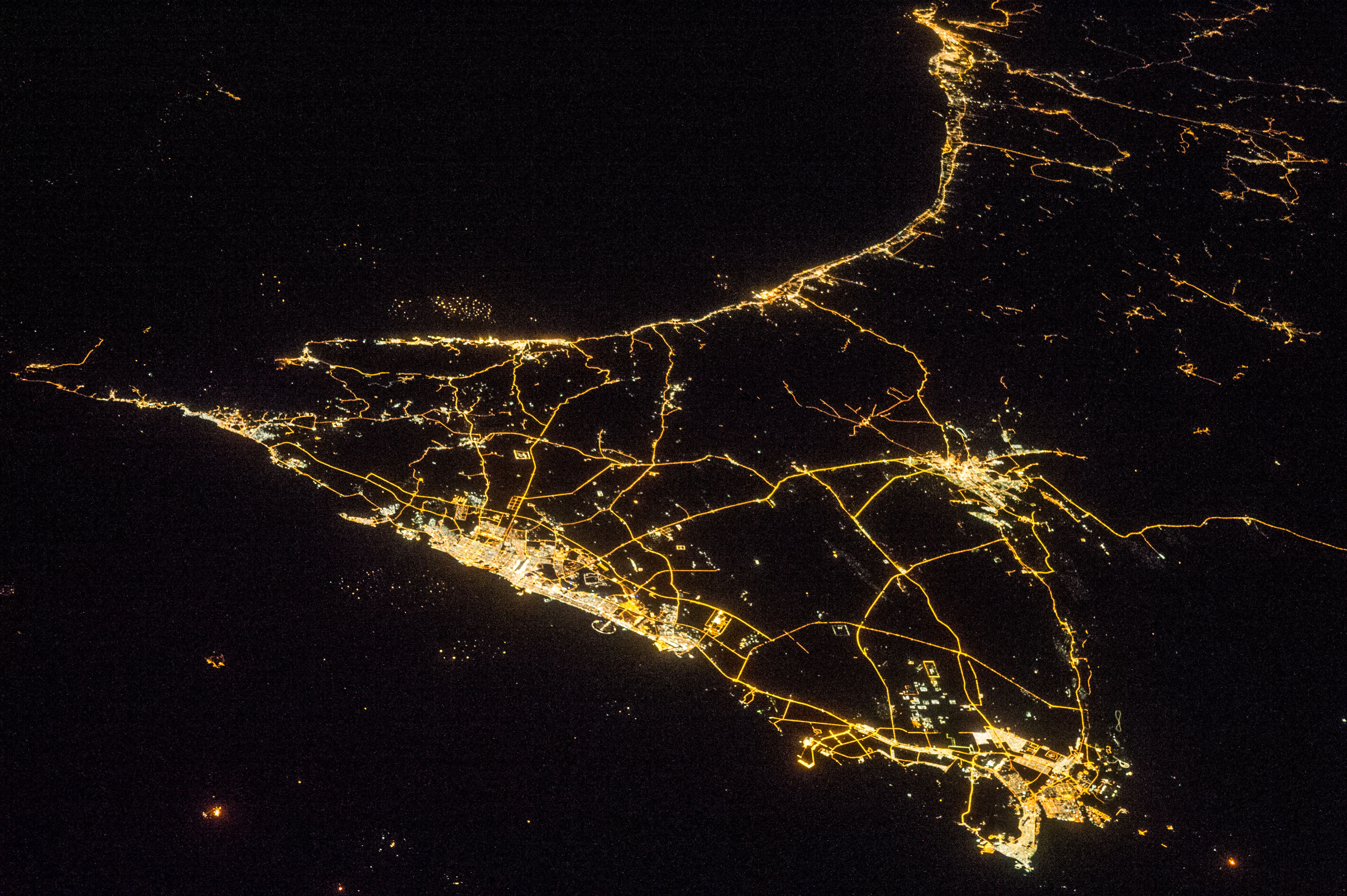
Nighttime view of the United Arab Emirates

"Ecological footprint World resources are being consumed at a rate 25% faster on average than their availability". That is caused by the UAE's rapidly growing population in their major cities while environmental resources are rare. Urbanization destroyed the natural habitat and industrial development led to water pollution and exploitation of natural resources.

In 1971, when the United Arab Emirates was founded, the country´s population was approximately 300,000 people. Today, the country has over 9,000,000 people while 89,5% live in urban areas. Within the next 100 years, the centralization on the coastal area will face a rising sea level caused by climate change. For instance, 50% of the United Arab Emirates population would be affected by a sea-level rising of 5 meters.

== Limited agricultural land ==
"The interannual, monthly and daily distribution of climate variables (e.g., temperature, radiation, precipitation, water vapour pressure in the air and wind speed) affects a number of physical, chemical and biological processes that drive the productivity of agricultural, forestry and fisheries systems." Through the impact of pollution, the exploitation of natural resources and destruction of wildlife habitat, climate variables change and affect environmental conditions. This leads to less productivity in agriculture through water scarcity and soil erosion.

The United Arab Emirates have had ever a high dependency on the international food market because of their semi-arid landscape. Through these basic conditions, agriculture is almost not possible. That is the reason why only 81 000 hectares of cultivated land exists. Also, only 1 percent of their water consumption can be supplied by rainfall. UAE's food security is challenged even more by the effects of climate change. To support the domestic cultivation of raw materials, the country has extended its agricultural policies, for instance by implementing new support of new innovations in agriculture technology, a more efficient water usage, and specific crop selection.

The UAE's region of Ra's al-Khaimah owns the most successful agricultural plants, watered by the mountains of Oman. Nevertheless, the domestic production is only considered as 1 percent of countries gross domestic product. Since agriculture is only rarely possible, the UAE have a high dependency on grocery imports. For instance, their total imports were forecasted with US$20 billion in 2006. The country is considered as one of the largest net importer of staple food on a global scale. The import contains mostly wheat, rice, and sugar. India is the most important supplier with 15 to 20 percent of the total. The Emirates also lease areas in countries like Sudan, Morocco and Pakistan, to provide food security.

Almost all Gulf Cooperation Council states depend on agri-food import except Saudi Arabia. Some of the GCC countries began to search for farmland because of the increasing international food prices.

== Air pollution ==
The United Arab Emirates is a contributor to greenhouse gas emissions, listed as having 29th highest carbon dioxide emissions. This was caused by the boom in oil-industry in the early 21st century which contributed to a great increase in population and its consumption. The United Arab Emirate's fossil fuels have always been the main factor in energy security and economic activity.

From 1990 until 2008, carbon dioxide emissions increased from 60.8 to 146.9 million tons. From 2009 to 2010, the energy demand in Dubai continued to increase over 10%. In order to satisfy the rising energy demand, the Emirates responded in 2011 with a new mixture of energy supplies by including coal as the most important power source as well as natural gas, nuclear power and a low input of solar energy. In 2015, UAE's energy sector polluted about 50% of the total carbon dioxide emissions. By 2020, the UAE target increasing sustainable energy by 20 percent.

As of 2023, the UAE's electricity generation was predominantly from natural gas and oil, with renewables and nuclear energy contributing 14% of the total capacity. The energy sector is a major source of greenhouse gas emissions, accounting for a significant portion of the nation's total CO₂ output.

Air pollution in the UAE poses serious health risks, including respiratory issues and cardiovascular diseases. A report by Human Rights Watch in 2023 highlighted the detrimental effects of fossil fuel-related air pollution, particularly on migrant workers.

In 2024, the UAE pledged to reduce its greenhouse gas emissions by 47% by 2035 compared to 2019 levels, as part of its updated Nationally Determined Contributions. The country continues to invest in renewable energy projects, such as the 1-gigawatt solar facility launched by Masdar in 2025.

== Bibliography ==
- The Gulf Monarchies and Climate Change: Abu Dhabi and Qatar in an Era of Natural Unsustainability
- 2016 Country Review United Arab Emirates." Review. 2016: n. pag.
- Luomi, Mari. The Gulf Monarchies and Climate Change: Abu Dhabi and Qatar in an Era of Natural Unsustainability. N.p.: n.p., 2014.
- Abed, Ibrahim Al. United Arab Emirates: A New Perspective. London: Trident, 2001.
- Shahbaz, Muhammad, Rashid Sbia, Helmi Hamdi, and Ilhan Ozturk. "Economic Growth, Electricity Consumption, Urbanization and Environmental Degradation Relationship in United Arab Emirates. "Ecological Indicators 45 (2014): 622-31.
- Maraqa, Munjed A, Hassan D, Imran, and Salem Hegazy. "Modeling Changes in Hydraulic Conductivity Due to Siltation Using Soil Columns from Alshuwaib Dam Site, United Arab Emirates." SpringerLink. N.p., 14 May 2015. Web. 7 Oct. 2016.
- Maraqa, Munjed A., Hassan D. Imran, and Salem Hegazy. "Modeling Changes in Hydraulic Conductivity Due to Siltation Using Soil Columns from Alshuwaib Dam Site, United Arab Emirates." Environ Earth Sci Environmental Earth Sciences 74.5 (2015): 4345-354.
- Tolba, Mostafa K., Saab, Najib W. Arab Environment Climate Change. Rep. N.p.: Arab Forum for Environment and Development, 2009.
- Almansoori, Ali, and Alberto Betancourt-Torcat. "Design Optimization Model for the Integration of Renewable and Nuclear Energy in the United Arab Emirates' Power System." Applied Energy 148 (2015): 234-51.
