= 2023 United Nations Climate Change Conference =

Yearly conference held for climate change treaty negotiations

- COP 28 logo
- Native name: 2023 United Nation Climate Change Conference
- Date: 30 November – 13 December 2023
- Location: Expo City, Dubai, United Arab Emirates
- Organised by: United Arab Emirates
- Participants: UNFCCC member countries
- President: Sultan Al Jaber
- Previous event: ← Sharm El Sheikh 2022
- Next event: → Baku 2024
- Website: www.cop28.com

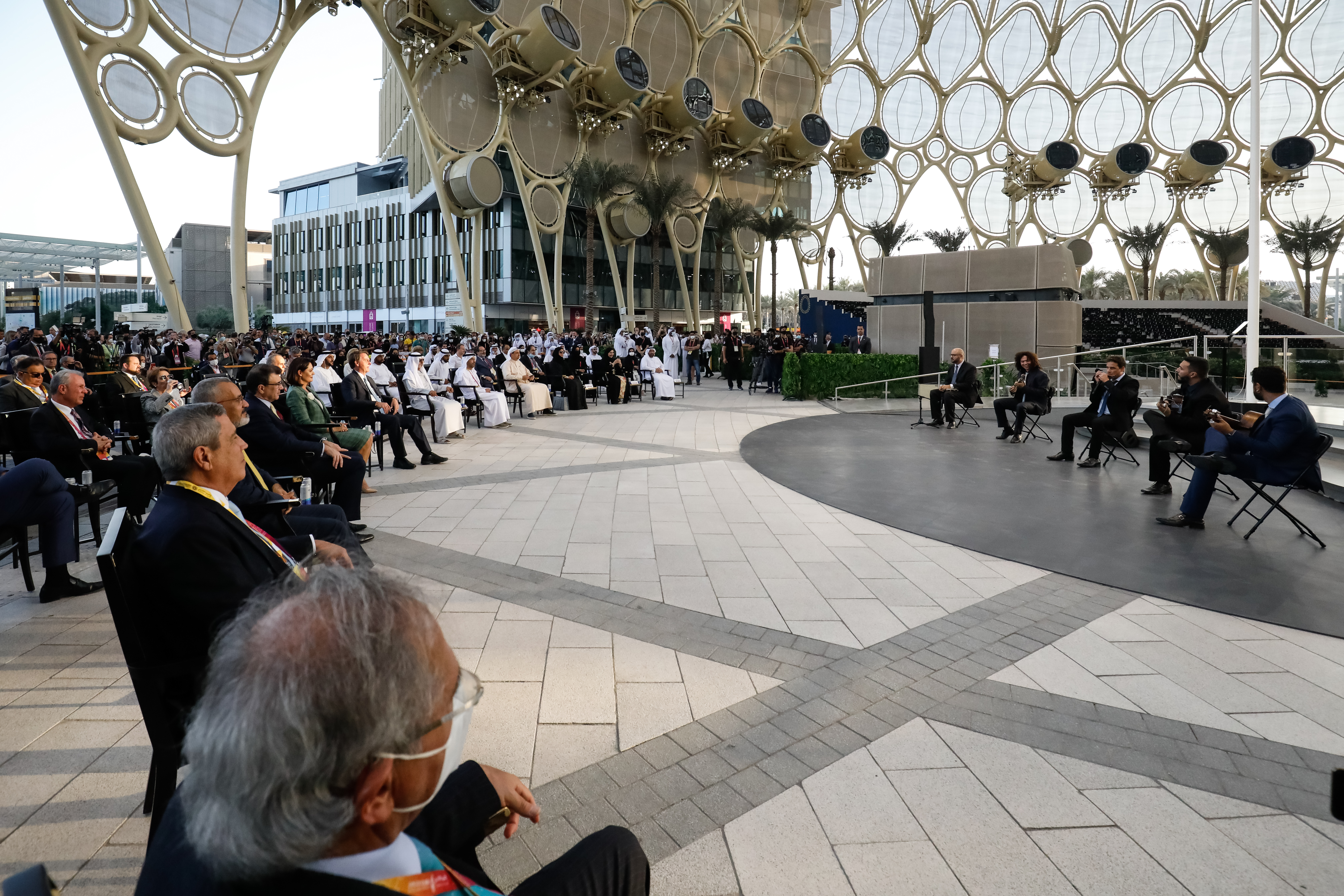
Al Wasl Plaza, Expo City, Dubai

The 2023 United Nations Climate Change Conference or Conference of the Parties of the UNFCCC, more commonly known as COP28, was the 28th United Nations Climate Change conference, held from 30 November to 13 December at Expo City Dubai. The COP conference has been held annually (except for the year 2020 due to the COVID-19 pandemic) since the first UN climate agreement in 1992. The event is intended for governments to agree on policies to limit global temperature rises and adapt to impacts associated with climate change.

The conference was originally scheduled to end on 12 December, but had to be extended following Saudi objections on the final agreement. On 13 December, the conference president, Sultan Al Jaber announced that a final compromise agreement between the countries involved had been reached. The deal commits all signatory countries to move away from carbon energy sources "in a just, orderly and equitable manner" to mitigate the worst effects of climate change, and reach net zero by the year 2050. The global pact, referred to as the UAE Consensus, was the first in the history of COP summits to explicitly mention the need to shift away from every type of fossil fuels, but it still received widespread criticism due to the lack of a clear commitment to either fossil fuel phase-out or phase-down. China and India did not sign the pledge to triple their output of renewable energy and committed to coal power instead.

The conference was widely criticised for its controversial president Sultan Al Jaber, as well as its host country, the United Arab Emirates, which is known for its opaque environmental record and role as a major producer of fossil fuels. Al Jaber is the CEO of the Abu Dhabi National Oil Company (ADNOC), leading to concerns over conflict of interest. Claims of greenwashing of Al Jaber on Wikipedia, Twitter and Medium; the legal inability to criticise Emirati corporations in the UAE; alleged covert access to conference emails by ADNOC; and the invitation of Syrian president Bashar al-Assad have all raised concerns regarding the integrity of the conference. Al Jaber stated before the beginning of the conference that there was "no science" behind fossil fuel phase-out in achieving 1.5 °C; and leaked documents appeared to show the UAE planned to use the conference to strike new fossil fuel deals with other nations. Al Jaber claimed that his comments on the phase-out of fossil fuels were "misinterpreted" and denied the latter allegation, asserting that the UAE does not need the COP presidency to establish business deals.

== Background ==
=== Host city ===
The United Nations Climate Change Conference is an annual conference of all countries that have signed the 1994 United Nations Framework Convention on Climate Change. It is held annually, with the host countries rotating among its current members. In early 2021, the United Arab Emirates offered to host the 2023 event. Dubai was chosen as the host city in November of the same year. It was the third time it was hosted by a member of OPEC after Indonesia in 2007 and the then member Qatar in 2012.

The United Arab Emirates is one of the most climate-vulnerable countries in the world, due to its very hot and humid climate. Its average air temperature has risen by 1.27 °C (2.29 °F) between 1990 and 2022. The Red Sea and Persian Gulf have exceeded safe wet-bulb temperature thresholds several times. Other impacts felt in the region are more frequent dust storms, sea level rise and drought. The UAE has committed to reducing carbon emissions to net zero by 2050; the first Middle Eastern government to make such a pledge. It was also the first country in the region to sign the Paris Agreement on 21 September 2016. The country has invested $50 billion into clean energy internationally and promised an additional $50 billion by 2030.

==== Reception ====
The choice of the UAE as host country was criticized by many climate scientists and human rights advocates around the globe, as the country is both a leading oil producer and an authoritarian state without freedom of speech. The Emirati organisers warned speakers not to criticise Islam or the Emirati government, corporations or individuals. Human Rights Watch urged governments to use the opportunity to push the UAE to ease the "grip on civic space and uphold rights" and end the persecution of human rights activists like Ahmed Mansoor. On 1 August 2023, the UAE allowed environmental activists to "assemble peacefully" at the summit and vowed to provide them a space to "make their voices heard", despite laws that prohibit unauthorised protests.

The UAE's appointment of Sultan Al Jaber president of COP28 caused further controversy, as he is also the CEO of the Abu Dhabi National Oil Company (ADNOC). In February 2023, one month after Al Jaber's selection, the company announced plans to expand drilling for fossil fuels. More than 100 members of the European Parliament, U.S. senators and U.S. representatives signed a joint open letter calling on the UAE to withdraw Al Jaber's appointment. U.S. climate envoy John Kerry acknowledged Al Jaber's selection as COP president was "risky", but nonetheless supported it, arguing it was important to have fossil fuel producers at the table.

In June 2023, a report by The Guardian revealed that ADNOC shared an email server with COP28 and was able to read emails to and from the climate summit office. The COP28 office switch to a different server following The Guardian's inquiry.

=== Preparations ===
In the months leading up to the summit, joint preparations were held by the United States of America, China and the European Union. The climate envoys of the U.S. (John Kerry), China (Xie Zhenhua) and the EU (Frans Timmermans) met regularly to discuss priorities and planning. On 15 November, the U.S. and China announced an agreement to triple global renewable energy use by 2030. The agreement included a commitment to addressing greenhouse gases, but was criticised for not including a commitment from China to phase out coal-fired power plants. Insiders cautiously expressed hope for a climate agreement between China and the United States ahead of the conference, similar to the agreement of 2014 that paved the way for the Paris Agreement. China published a plan to reduce methane emissions ahead of the conference, but there was expected contention on coal use in China. China characterises coal as essential for its energy security, although others say energy security could be improved through upgrades to the energy grid and domestic energy market. Talks between Janet Yellen and He Lifeng yielded a decision to enhance cooperation between the countries on climate related issues and much was expected from the meeting between President of the United States Joe Biden and General Secretary of the Chinese Communist Party Xi Jinping later in the month at the 2023 APEC summit.

At the end of November 2023, a pre-COP meeting of ministers was held. One hundred delegations and 70 ministers attended, more than any prior pre-COP meeting. The general director of the COP, Majid al-Suwaidi, insisted the conference would fulfill the commitment to create a loss and damage fund, as was agreed at the 2022 United Nations Climate Change Conference.

The UAE had initially invited the president of Syria, Bashar al-Assad, to COP28, resulting in widespread condemnation. Assad ultimately did not come, sending his prime minister Hussein Arnous instead.

Ahead of the summit, the Muslim Council of Elders, in partnership with the COP28 Presidency, the UN Environment Programme and the Catholic Church, and under the patronage of the UAE's president Sheikh Mohamed bin Zayed Al-Nahyan, organised a Global Faith Leaders Summit convening 28 faith leaders to address climate change.

==== Global stocktake ====
In September 2023, in advance of the opening of COP28, the United Nations published the first two-year assessment of global progress in slowing down climate change, called the "global stocktake". This type of overview was established during the 2021 COP26 in Glasgow and is scheduled to be repeated every five years. The report concluded that a phase-out of fossil fuels is needed, something that the United Nations had previously avoided saying. Among the 17 key findings of the report are:

- The Paris Agreement and the resulting climate action significantly helped in reducing emissions. In 2011 the projected warming by 2100 was 3.7–4.8 °C. After COP27 it was 2.4–2.6 °C and in the best case, if all pledges are accomplished, 1.7–2.1 °C.
- As of September 2023, the world is not on track to reach the targets of the Paris Agreement. For having a more than 50% chance of limiting temperature rise to 1.5 °C and more than 67% chance of limiting it to 2 °C, global emissions must peak by the year 2025.
- Trillions of dollars are needed for limiting warming to 1.5 °C.
- More effective international cooperation and collaboration are crucial for reaching the targets of the Paris Agreement.

=== Expectations ===
Fatih Birol, head of the International Energy Agency, expressed hope for significant achievements at the summit but noted: "[the] geopolitical situation, with many nations at loggerheads over the war in Ukraine, and still frosty relations between the U.S. and China, would make for a difficult summit [...] The most important challenge [to limiting temperature rises to 1.5 °C above pre-industrial levels] is the lack of international cooperation." The climate envoy from Bangladesh described the lack of global solidarity as the main obstacle to stopping climate change, emphasising the need to create a loss and damage fund. Governments expressed concern that similar to the Russian invasion of Ukraine, the 2023 Gaza war may adversely impact negotiations at COP28.

Before the conference, Pope Francis issued an apostolic exhortation called Laudate Deum, calling for brisk action against the climate crisis and condemning climate change denial. The Pope planned to attend the conference, which would have marked the first papal visit to a United UN Climate Change conference, but had to pull out due to ill health. United States president Joe Biden did not attend, with the Gaza war and internal U.S. government spending difficulties being cited as possible causes.

According to Professor Alon Tal, a renowned scholar of climate change issues, "There was no compelling reason to believe that the 2023 UN climate gathering would be any different than its predecessor and that significant progress would be made. As November approached, the prospects for the annual UN climate conference were hardly promising. In thirty years of global climate diplomacy, never had the lead-up to a UN environmental gathering been mired in such political controversy: COP28 was convened in Dubai, a symbol of the world's oil economy."

== Summit proceedings ==
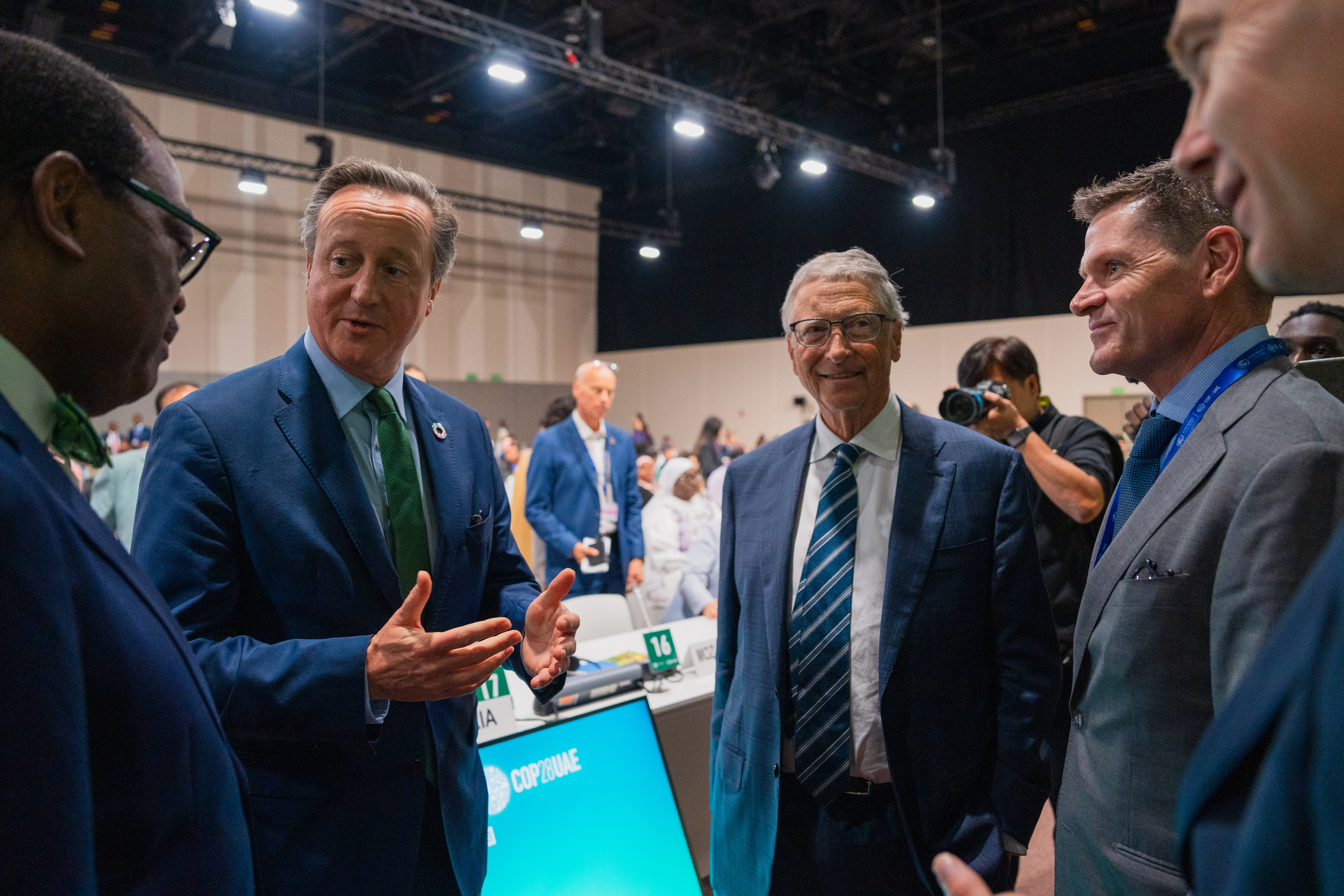
UK Foreign Secretary David Cameron and Bill Gates at COP28 in Dubai on December 1, 2023

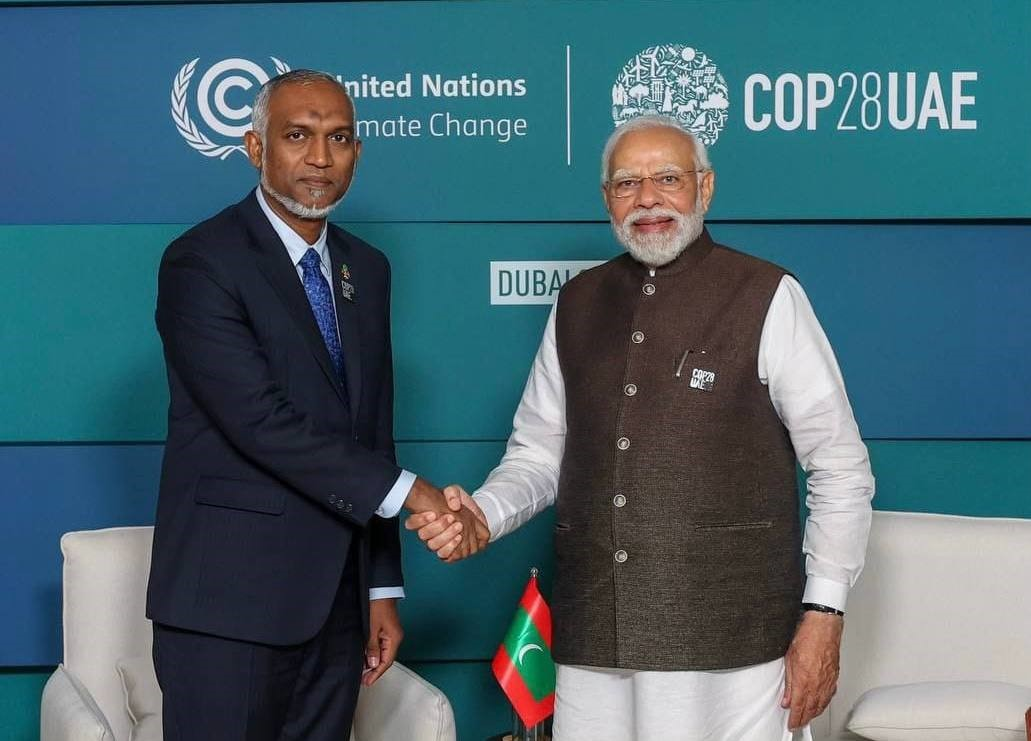
Indian Prime Minister Narendra Modi meeting Maldivian President Mohamed Muizzu at the conference

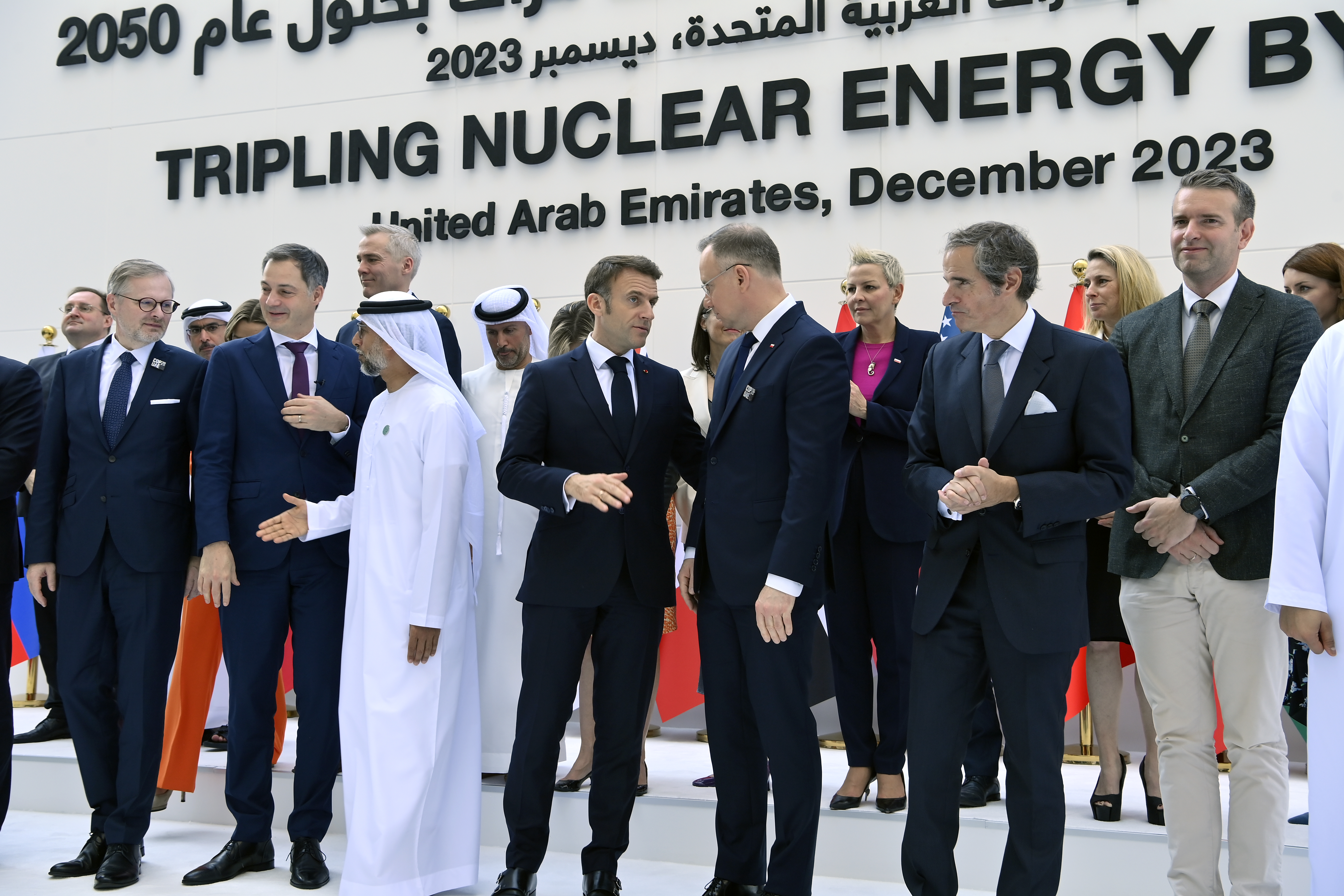
French President Emmanuel Macron at COP28 in Dubai on December 2, 2023

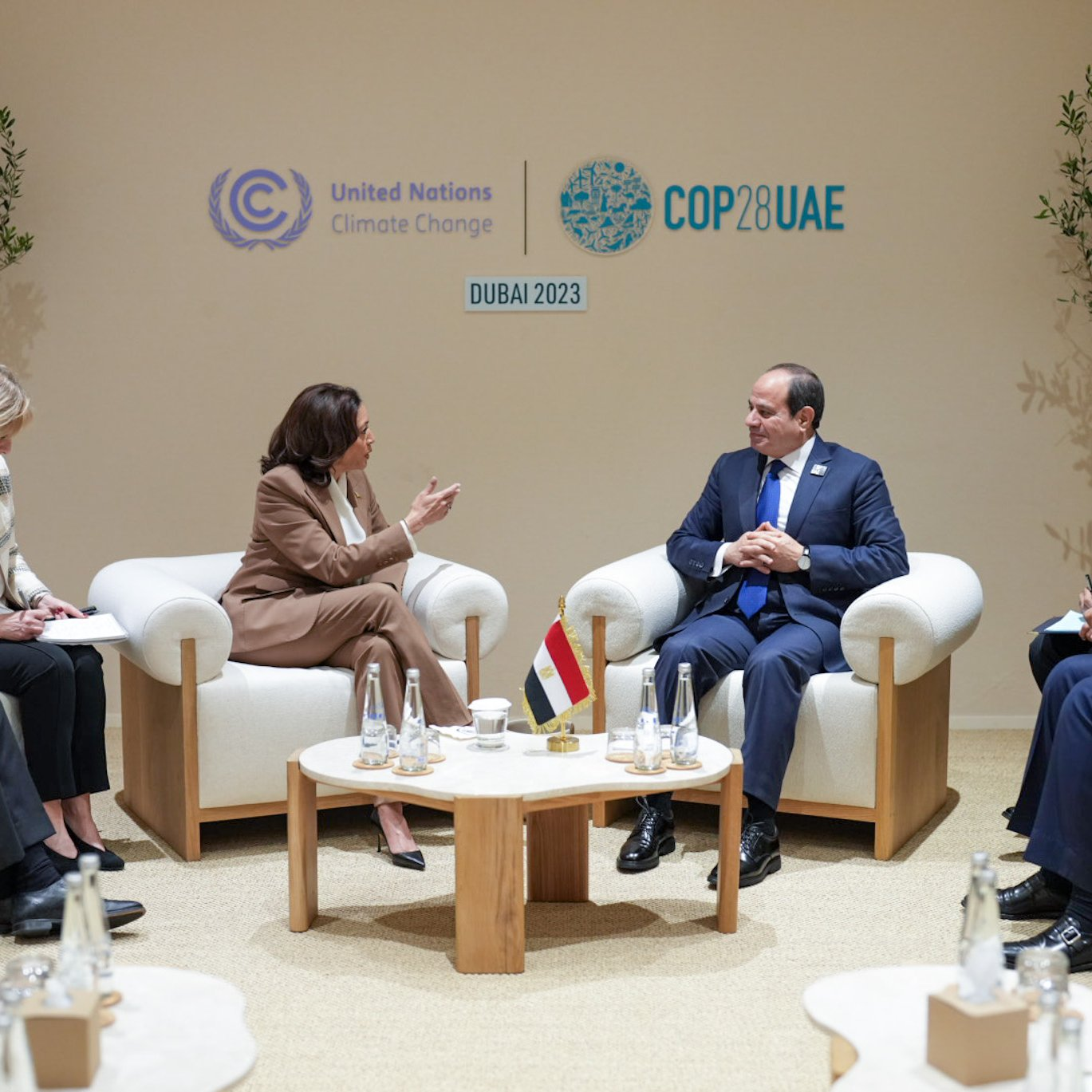
Egyptian President Abdel Fattah el-Sisi and U.S. Vice President Kamala Harris holding a bilateral meeting at COP28, December 2, 2023

COP28 was the largest-ever climate summit, with over 80,000 people accredited participants, up from 49,000 the previous year. Twenty-three thousand five hundred of the participants were from government teams, including more than 150 heads of state and government. A further 27,000 were policy experts, academics and representatives of fossil fuel producers, although this group was not given access to official negotiations. An additional 400,000 people were granted access to the surrounding "green zone", a conference space for activists and businesses. The number of attendees and the use of private jets by many of them was the subject of some criticism. The meeting was estimated to have the largest carbon footprint of any climate summit to date.

Charles III, King of the United Kingdom and the Commonwealth realms, gave the opening speech at the summit. He expressed alarm at rising levels of pollution, saying that the world was "dreadfully far off track" its climate targets and warning that "we are carrying out a vast, frightening experiment of changing every ecological condition, all at once, at a pace that far outstrips nature's ability to cope".

On the first day of the summit on 30 November 2023, a "loss and damage" fund to compensate poor states for the effects of climate change was agreed upon. The fund aims to distribute funds to poor states harmed by climate change and is to be administered by the World Bank. The host country, the United Arab Emirates, and Germany each pledged $100 million to the fund. Smaller pledges by the United Kingdom ($75 million), United States ($24.5 million) and Japan ($10 million) brought the total to $430 million on the first day.

On 1 December 2023, activists protested outside the venue, calling for ecocide—mass environmental destruction—to be made a crime at the International Criminal Court. The same day, the Brazilian environment and finance ministers presented the Tropical Forest Forever Facility, an international investment instrument to fund tropical forest conservation.

On 3 December 2023, COP28 participants launched the Declaration to Triple Nuclear Energy capacity from 2020 to 2050. The declaration was unveiled by U.S. climate envoy John Kerry, and signed by 25 countries. The signing countries pledged to implement policies to extend their nuclear capacities, stating that nuclear power played a key role in cutting carbon emissions to net zero.

On 2 December 2023, German Chancellor Olaf Scholz called for a phase-out of fossil fuels, including coal, oil and natural gas, and reiterated Germany's commitment to be climate neutral by 2045, saying: "The technologies are there: wind power, photovoltaics, electric motors, green hydrogen."

On 3 December 2023, The Guardian revealed that COP28 President Sultan Al-Jaber had dismissed demands for a fossil fuel phase-out two weeks previously, denying its basis in science and claiming it would prevent economic development. The following day, Al-Jaber held a press conference in which he walked back his comments, stating that he stated he "respects science" and thinks a phaseout of fossil fuel use is inevitable.

=== Draft and final agreements ===
On 11 December, the day before the summit was scheduled to end, an initial draft of the final agreement was released. It was widely rejected by most Western countries because it avoided calling for a fossil fuel phaseout; The Alliance of Small Island States described the draft as a "death certificate" for small island nations. Several African countries countered that wealthy countries had an obligation to take the lead on phasing out fossil fuels before expecting poorer countries to do so. OPEC, a cartel of oil-producing countries, also urged participants to reject any mention of phasing out fossil fuels. After two days of intense negotiations, a compromise was reached under which the final text called for countries to "end their dependence" on fossil fuels "in a just, orderly and equitable manner", while stopping short of calling for a full phase-out. The agreement also called for a tripling of global renewable energy capacity by 2030, the development of numerous "zero- and low-emission technologies", further efforts "towards the phase-down of unabated coal power" and a cut in methane emissions. The term unabated is generally understood to mean the use of carbon capture and storage, however the agreement left the term undefined. China and India did not sign the pledge to triple their output of renewable energy, and committed to coal power instead.

For the first time in the history of COP summits, the global pact explicitly mentioned the necessity to shift away from all kinds of fossil fuels; however, the deal was widely criticized for not including a clear commitment to "phase out" or "phase down" fossil fuels—as requested by many participating countries, civil society groups and scientists—as well as a clear financial plan to help developing countries reach the goal of transitioning away from fossil fuels. Moreover, the choice to include carbon capture and storage in the list of "zero- and low-emission technologies" was questioned due to its relative expensiveness and lack of effectiveness in comparison to other methods.

The participants of the conference pledged 85 billion dollars to different climate issues and made ten pledges:

- Coalition for High-Ambition Multilevel Partnerships (CHAMP) for Climate Action Pledge was signed by 71 countries including the United States, Brazil, France and Germany. It includes commitments to promote international and subnational climate action, make new, more ambitious nationally determined contributions by 2025, increase efforts for climate change adaptation, and preserving biodiversity to limit warming to 1.5 degrees.
- UAE Leaders' Declaration on a Global Climate Finance Framework was signed by 13 countries including the United States, India, United Kingdom and Germany. Includes targets of mobilizing $100 billion by 2025 and $5–7 trillion by 2030 to climate action, make a debt reform, put in place an emissions pricing mechanism, mobilize concession and private capital.
- COP28 UAE Declaration on Climate and Health was endorsed by 143 countries including the European Union, China and United States. Includes commitments to reduce negative health impacts from climate change in collaboration with Indigenous peoples, women, local communities and health workers, and to prevent zoonotic spillover.
- COP28 Declaration on Climate, Relief, Recovery and Peace was adopted by 82 countries, including Canada, China, Ukraine, United States and Rwanda. The declaration includes commitments to promote peace, environmental policies that support peace, prevent climate change from increasing conflict, help and empower people affected by environmental degradation and conflict.
- Global Renewables and Energy Efficiency Pledge was signed by 130 countries, including Bhutan, Brazil, European Union, Angola, Bangladesh, Burkina Faso and Chad. The countries pledge to refer to energy efficiency as "first fuel" and double the rate of energy efficiency increase "from around 2% to over 4% every year until 2030". They also pledged to triple the capacity of renewable energy by 2030, ensuring a just transition, increase renewable energy use and energy efficiency in an "environmentally responsible manner".
- COP28 UAE Declaration on Sustainable Agriculture, Resilient Food Systems, and Climate Action was adopted by 159 countries including Australia, Belarus, Brazil, China and the United States. It includes commitments to make the global food system more sustainable and climate resilient, promote food security by helping vulnerable people, pass to sustainable water management, include food systems into climate action strategies, protect and restore nature.
- COP28 Gender-Responsive Just Transitions and Climate Action Partnership includes 76 countries, among others Canada, China, Sweden, Democratic Republic of the Congo, Israel and the United Arab Emirates. Its declaration includes a pledge to ensure a just transition, considering the effects on women especially indigenous, rural and with disabilities.
- Global Cooling Pledge for COP28 was endorsed by 61 countries including Denmark, Japan, Canada, United States, Spain. The declaration mentions the effects of increasing heat waves on health and economy (including food waste) and the contribution of the cooling industry to climate change. The signers pledged among others to cut GHG emissions from the cooling industry by 68% by 2050, increase the efficiency rate of air conditioning equipment by half by the year 2030, make a national plan for cooling, increase green spaces and blue spaces in cities and promote passive cooling (that can "reduce a building's cooling load by more than 25%").
- COP28 Declaration of Intent was endorsed by 37 countries and includes different pledges to advance hydrogen engines (including derivatives of hydrogen) as a climate solution.
- COP28 Joint Statement on Climate, Nature and People was endorsed by 18 countries including China, United States, Canada, France, Germany and the United Kingdom. The statement recognizes that the problems of climate change, biodiversity loss, land degradation, ocean degradation and social inequality are interconnected and cannot be solved separately. Therefore, the signers pledge to unify the plans to solve the problems into one integrated strategy.

=== Public health considerations ===
Numerous sessions at COP28 were devoted to the impact of climate change on public health; it was the first COP to address the topic. "Lethal humidity," or 100% humidity at temperatures of 35 °C (95 °F), was a particular focus of discussion. Air pollution increases respiratory conditions and increases the risk of cancer and heart disease. In a letter addressed to Sultan Al Jaber, "organisations representing more than 46 million health professionals" said a complete phase-out of fossil fuels was the only decisive way to deliver health for all.

Previously, experts such as Edmond Fernandes had urged UNFCCC to make public health an essential part of all climate meetings and policies, calling human health integral to sustainable climate futures.

=== Food systems ===
COP28 is the first COP where food systems were discussed. During the event, the UAE Declaration on Sustainable Agriculture, Resilient Food Systems, and Climate Action was adopted by 159 countries. Two-thirds of the estimated 250,000 meals served at the event were plant-based. The UN's Food and Agriculture Organization issued a roadmap report at the event outlining how to reduce agricultural emissions from methane. Food journalist Avery Yale Kamila said the roadmap "would require Americans to cut food waste and to move to flexitarian diets with far fewer animal products."

== Controversies ==
=== Greenwashing accusations ===
Prior to the conference, the UAE hired public relations and lobbying agencies, including Akin Gump Strauss Hauer & Feld, Gulstan Advisory and FleishmanHillard, to improve its poor reputation on climate change. Allegations surfaced regarding attempts to manipulate public perception, including that Al Jaber's team had edited Wikipedia to portray him more favorably. ADNOC and Masdar also paid Wikipedia editors to lobby for changes to their respective pages, although the users followed Wikipedia's conflict-of-interest rules. Reports also emerged of the proliferation of fake social media accounts on Twitter and Medium, aimed at promoting COP28 and defending the UAE's presidency.

A report by The Guardian based on leaked documents revealed that the UAE had prepared an extensive list of talking points for organizers to use when addressing "touchy and sensitive issues", particularly around the country's climate record and human rights violations, such as the war in Yemen and human trafficking. For instance, one talking point instructed officials to deflect from ADNOC's refusal to disclose its emissions by responding, "ADNOC is currently conducting necessary studies".

Campaigning journalist Amy Westervelt argued that a newly added requirement to for industry lobbyists to identify themselves at COP28 was inadequate to control their influence.

During the previous decade, the UAE had spent more than $1 million on direct climate-focused advocacy and paid millions more to public relations firms and think tanks to polish its green credentials. No other host nation has invested as much time and money to shape its image ahead of the annual climate negotiations.

The UAE hired a US-based PR firm, First International Resources, to "counteract all negative press and media reports" around the Gulf state as a COP28 host. The agreement followed the negative criticism of the UAE's decision to assign Sultan Al Jaber as the COP28 president. On 4 August 2023, the company registered under the United States Foreign Agents Registration Act to represent Masdar. According to the filings, the PR firm was supposed to seek to "reinforce attitudes among decision-makers in Washington, D.C., and across Europe regarding the strategic value of the UAE in the global fight to address climate change". The UAE was to pay First International Resources a monthly retainer fee of $100,000. Fossil Free Media founder and director Jamie Henn said such an amount is not paid to a PR firm "when you're confident about your public image". He said that much is spent "when you want to spin the public to believe the impossible", such as the claim that the UAE and Al Jaber had been "really committed to transitioning away from fossil fuels".

In August 2023, The Guardian revealed that the UAE failed to report its methane emissions to the UN for nearly a decade. Meanwhile, Sultan Al Jaber's ADNOC set a much higher methane leak target than the level it claimed to have already reached. Cutting methane emissions is believed to be a fast and low-cost method to slow the temperature rise because methane causes almost a quarter of global heating. In November of the same year, the Centre for Research on Energy reported that the UAE regularly flared methane gas, breaking its own regulations. Minister of Foreign Affairs Abdullah bin Zayed Al Nahyan commissioned a survey of over 20,000 from 20 countries, which was used by the officials to discuss the public attitude towards the Arab nation. The major concerns were all about human rights. One of the participants, Sconaid McGeachin said COPs have become a platform for activism, and reportedly said: "We need to preserve the reputation of the UAE ... and try to minimise those attacks as much as possible". A spokesperson for COP28, called the leaked recording "unverified", but stated that COP28 would "engage all stakeholders".

=== Treatment of migrant workers ===
The UAE has been adapting its conference facility, the prior site for Expo 2020, to host the COP28 climate conference. FairSquare, a UK-based human rights group, released a report based on testimonies and photographs, stating that the migrant workers were being exposed to dangerously hot weather and humidity to prepare for the climate summit. According to the rights group, in September 2023, a dozen migrant workers from Asia and Africa were working outdoors in temperatures hitting 42 °C (108 °F) despite a midday ban. COP28 denied the allegations and claimed that no evidence of the midday ban's breach was found. A worksite supervisor said most of the work is done at night, but some has to be done whenever possible. A COP28 spokesperson said contractors were required to have worker heat safety plans and weather stations that monitor the thermal work limit, as well as taking into account heat and humidity metrics including wet and dry bulb temperature and wind speed.

=== Digital surveillance ===
Ahead of COP28, Amnesty International raised concerns that the UAE might continue to use digital surveillance to spy on human rights defenders and civil society members in the UAE, including the COP28 participants. According to Amnesty International's Disrupting Surveillance Team, the UAE had a record of using digital surveillance to "crush dissents and stifle freedom of expression". Amnesty's view of the UAE's promise to offer a "platform for activists' voices" would be unachievable without respect for the human rights of privacy and the right of peaceful assembly. Amnesty opposed the "unlawful electronic surveillance of conference participants [and of] Emirati nationals and residents". It said that the COP28 attendees should be allowed to download "privacy-respecting international communications applications" in the UAE that would ensure safe and encrypted means of communication.

=== Alleged fossil fuel deals ===
On 7 November 2023, an AFP investigation revealed in multiple leaked documents that McKinsey was using its position as the primary advisor to COP28 hosts, the United Arab Emirates, to push the interest of its oil and gas clients (ExxonMobil and Aramco). McKinsey has been accused of putting its own interests ahead of the climate by sources involved in preparatory meetings for COP28. McKinsey's energy scenario for the COP28 presidency would allow for continued investment in fossil fuels, which would undermine the goals of the Paris Agreement; an "energy transition narrative" recommends oil use to be reduced by only 50% by 2050, and that trillions of dollars should continue to be invested in high-emission assets each year to at least 2050.

On 27 November 2023, the Centre for Climate Reporting and BBC News reported that based on leaked documents, the UAE intended to use COP28 as a platform to discuss fossil fuel deals with fifteen countries, including a deal with China to "jointly evaluate international LNG opportunities" in Mozambique, Canada and Australia. The report stated that fossil fuel talks between ADNOC and 15 countries were planned, in addition to talks between Masdar and 20 countries including the United Kingdom, France, Germany and others ahead of the summit. Al Jaber denied reports that the UAE wanted to seek oil deals at the summit, calling the allegations an attempt to undermine his work.

An analysis found that at least 2,456 COP28 attendees were fossil fuel lobbyists, receiving more passes than the ten countries most vulnerable to climate change. Analysis by Oxfam found that 34 billionaires—together worth roughly $495 billion—attended COP28 as delegates; a quarter of them had made their money in "highly polluting industries".

Sultan Al Jaber, the president of COP28, has drawn criticism for asserting there is no scientific basis for phasing out fossil fuels to limit global warming to 1.5 degrees Celsius, a claim revealed by The Guardian and the Centre for Climate Reporting. Described as "incredibly concerning" and bordering on climate denial, his comments contradict the stance of UN Secretary-General António Guterres. The remarks were made during a confrontational exchange with Mary Robinson, chair of the Elders group, at a live online event on 21 November. The Times noted widespread condemnation of Al Jaber's statements at COP28, where numerous countries, including the UK and EU members, advocated for the phased reduction of unabated fossil fuels. In contrast, former U.S. vice president Al Gore emphasised the historical significance of a potential COP28 agreement to phase out fossil fuels, considering it one of the most crucial events in human history. Simultaneously, BBC News reported a substantial increase in the United Arab Emirates' oil production, with ADNOC, the state oil firm, projected to drill 42% more by 2030. Despite this, ADNOC claims it aims to enhance climate-friendliness, including venturing into renewable energy, amid the global call for fossil fuel reduction.

=== Suppression of protests ===
On 11 December 2023, Licypriya Kangujam, a climate activist from India, walked onto the main stage of the conference, held up a sign, "End fossil fuels. Save our planet and our future.", and gave a brief speech. She was given a round of applause by the audience and removed from the session by security personnel. According to Kangujam, she was banned from further participation in COP28. Other activists criticised the UAE's heavy restrictions on protests, which Human Rights Watch called "shocking". Protests at the summit were largely confined to the "blue zone", an area under UN control where local laws do not apply. In the blue zone, local activists used COP28 as a platform for human rights demonstrations that are rare and generally not permitted in the UAE.

=== Investigation on Patrick Johnstone ===
New Westminster Mayor Patrick Johnstone attended the COP28 climate summit, with expenses covered by the C40 Cities Climate Leadership Group, in which Dubai is the part of Sterling Committee. This raised concerns about potential violations of the state's code of conduct. In February 2024, Councilors Daniel Fontaine and Paul Minhas filed a complaint against Johnstone, alleging that he violated state laws by accepting gifts to attend the COP28 summit. This led to an investigation by ethics commissioner Jennifer Devins. In her September 2024 report, Devins concluded that while Johnstone's attendance was relevant to his mayoral duties, accepting gifts like travel and accommodation was not aligned with his official responsibilities.

== Reactions ==
The head of the International Monetary Fund, Kristalina Georgieva, expressed satisfaction from the beginning of the conference because the loss and damage fund was created, but said that for further decarbonisation carbon pricing should be advanced and fossil fuel subsidies eliminated. Fossil fuel subsidies reached a record level of 7.1 trillion dollars in the year 2022, due to high fuel prices and inflation. There are propositions for a creation of a global carbon market managed by the United Nations in the conference. Some steps are already done.

On 6 December 2023, Haitham al-Ghais, the current OPEC Secretary-General, urged member nations to focus negotiations on reducing carbon emissions, rather than prohibiting the extraction and sale of fossil fuels. As a reaction, Greenpeace published a press release calling for Arab countries to phase out fossil fuels by 2050, ensuring a just transition. Greenpeace said that "The latest research from Christian Aid and the International Institute for Applied Systems Analysis in Vienna shows that both the United Arab Emirates and Saudi Arabia face a GDP growth reduction of −72% by 2100 if the global temperature rise is allowed to reach 3 °C." The study called Mercury Rising: the economic impact of climate change on the Arabian Peninsula predicts a 69% drop in GDP growth for countries at the Persian Gulf in average, with the highest impact on Saudi Arabia, Kuwait, Qatar and the UAE if temperatures will reach this level. If temperature rise will be limited to 1.5 degrees, the reduction in economic growth will be limited to 8.2% by 2050 and 36% by 2100.

== See also ==
- 2023 in climate change
- 49th G7 summit
- Carbon capture and storage
- Climate finance
- Environmental issues in the United Arab Emirates
- Global Assembly
- Global stocktake
- Greenwashing
- Hydrogen economy
- Plant-based action plan
