= Amy Westervelt =

American print and radio journalist

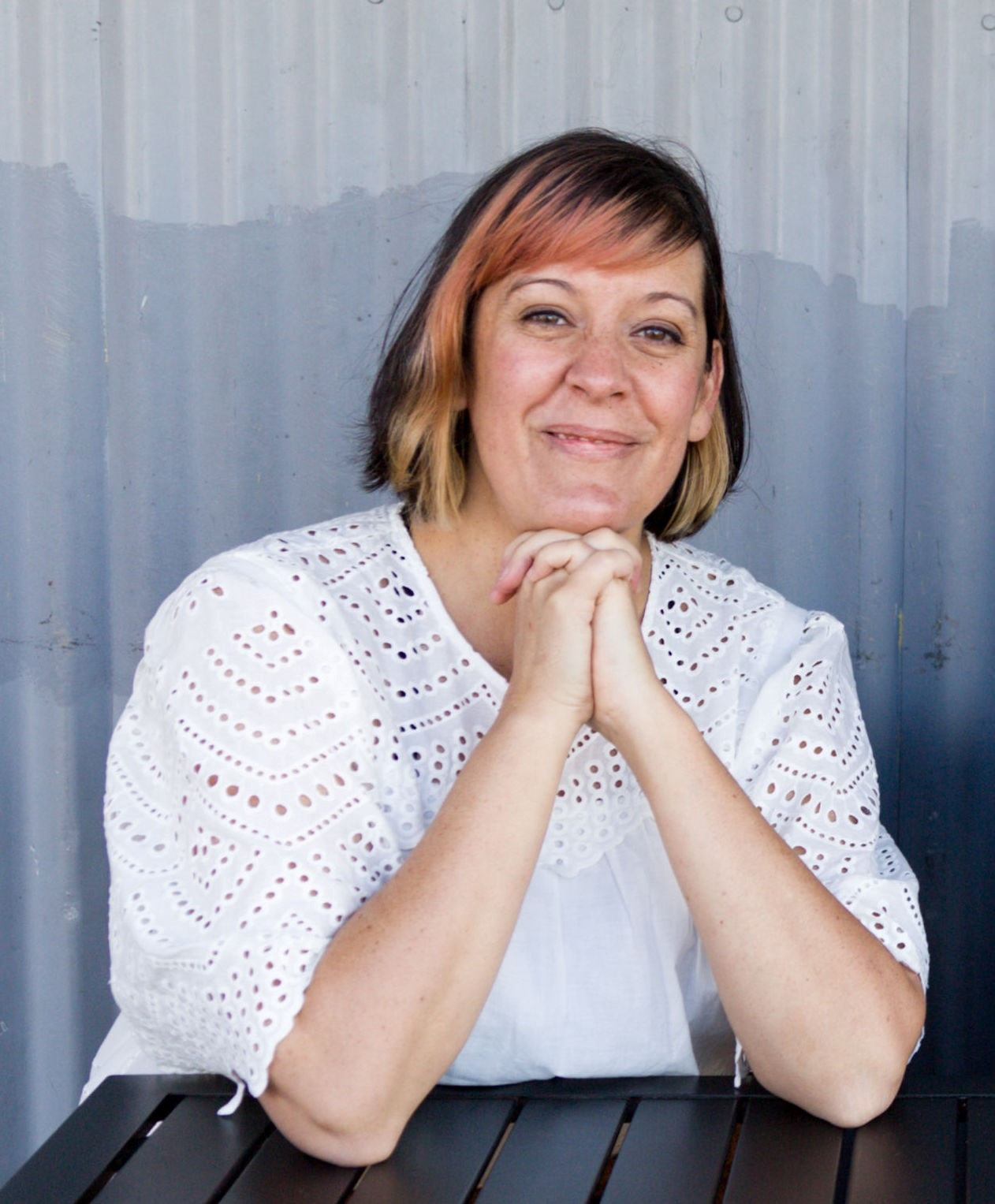
- Westervelt in 2019
- Born: 1978 (age 47–48)
- Education: University of California, Berkeley
- Occupation: journalist
- Writing career
- Genre: non-fiction

Amy Westervelt (born 1978) is an American environmental print and radio journalist. She is the founder of the podcast network Critical Frequency and hosts the popular podcast Drilled, which has been downloaded more than a million times. She is also co-host of the podcast Hot Take, along with climate writer Mary Annaïse Heglar, on the Critical Frequency podcast network. She has contributed to The Guardian, The Wall Street Journal, NPR, The New York Times, Huffington Post and Popular Science. Westervelt won an Edward R. Murrow Award as lead reporter for a series on the impacts of the Tesla Gigafactory in Nevada, aired on Reno Public Radio in 2017.

== Personal life ==
Amy Westervelt was born in 1978. She lives in Truckee, California. She has talked about her upbringing in interviews, particularly about her brother. "I have a brother who is a quadriplegic. And he's totally just a guy. He tells bad dirty jokes, and he's mean sometimes. He's human. There's a tendency to put people who struggle on a pedestal, because we don't know what category to place them in. But the reality is they're normal, like everyone else," she told Werk in 2017.

== Career ==
=== Print journalism ===
Westervelt's career has been largely devoted to reporting on issues related to the environment and, later, feminism and the economy. As her career went on she found greater intersections among these three topics. From 2006 to 2015, Westervelt wrote on occasion for GreenBiz. In 2009 and 2010, Westervelt contributed to InsideClimate News. Westervelt covered green technology for Forbes from 2011 to 2013, writing about companies, regulations and environmental issues. During this time, she published two travel guides: Michigan's Upper Peninsula: Great Destinations (2008) and Explorer's Guide Upper Peninsula (2012).

Westervelt contributed to The Guardian from 2014 to 2018. In those years, she was also a co-founder of Climate Confidential, which published investigative reports on environmental issues from 2014 to 2016.

=== Podcast network ===
Westervelt founded the podcast network Critical Frequency, which is home to 14 podcasts including Drilled, a show reported and hosted by Westervelt that digs into climate change denial. Critical Frequency was a launch partner for Slate's subscription and membership podcast platform Supporting Cast in 2019.

Drilled won a 2019 Online News Association Online Journalism Award for excellence in digital audio storytelling. "In the months since its release, Drilled has been downloaded more than a million times; been recommended by The New Yorker, Esquire, and New Scientist; and been quoted on the floor of the U.S. Senate," the award citation reads.

In April 2020, Westervelt's Drilled News site launched the Climate & COVID-19 Policy Tracker, an ongoing news feature documenting many climate and energy-related regulation rollbacks and suspensions, fossil fuel lease sales, financial relief offered to the fossil fuel industry, and other related moves taken by the Trump administration as well as some state governments amid the COVID-19 pandemic.

Episodes of Westervelt's podcast Rigged were published starting in September 2021. Westervelt and Drilled collaborated in 2023 with the Centre for Climate Reporting on an investigation into petrostates and the 2023 United Nations Climate Change Conference (COP28) in the United Arab Emirates.

=== Book ===
Westervelt's book on working mothers, Forget Having It All, was published by Seal Press (now an imprint of Basic Books) in 2018. Westervelt wondered "how it was that a culture that superficially holds motherhood in such high esteem could in fact have so little regard for women who have children."

Reviewer Rebecca Stoner describes the work as "an intellectual history of American motherhood," writing that Westervelt is "pragmatic in her response, suggesting a policy fix and a cultural fix at the end of each chapter that she thinks could be implemented without 'massive cultural and economic change.'" Stoner describes Westervelt's style as "direct and colloquial," "punctuated by deeply satisfying moments of ire at the demands placed on working mothers."

In interviews about the book, Westervelt often talked about her own motherhood and how she found resources in her community and is raising her son. "Having boys babysit is huge. I think letting boys be maternal in different ways too. Like my son, when he was like 4 or 5, really wanted a baby doll, and so many people just squashed that. They were just like, 'No, boys don't have baby dolls,' and I was just like, 'OK. Now we know why men aren't good with babies. Jeez,'" she told WBUR in 2018.

== Honors and awards ==
Westervelt won a Folio Eddie for her feature on the potential of algae as a feedstock for biofuel.

In 2015 she won a Rachel Carson Award for "women greening journalism" and her work with Climate Confidential.

Westervelt won an Edward R. Murrow Award (Radio Television Digital News Association) as lead reporter for a series on the impacts of the Tesla Gigafactory in Nevada, aired on KUNR in Reno, Nevada in 2017.

In 2021, she was nominated for a Peabody Award as the managing producer of the podcast This Land.

== Publications ==
- Westervelt, Amy (2018). Forget "Having It All": How America Messed Up Motherhood—and How to Fix It. Seal Press. ISBN 978-1-58005-786-8.
