= Declaration to Triple Nuclear Energy =

The Declaration to Triple Nuclear Energy by 2050 was announced by John Kerry at COP28.

== Context ==
Energy consumption in Turkey is expected to triple between 2025 and 2055.

As of 2023, the fertility rate in Nigeria is over 4, see demographics of Nigeria.

== Parties ==
Brazil joined the declaration only in 2026.

It was signed by the following countries:

- Armenia
- Belgium
- Brazil
- Bulgaria
- Canada
- China
- Croatia
- Czech Republic
- El Salvador
- Finland
- France
- Ghana
- Hungary
- Italy
- Jamaica
- Japan
- Kazakhstan
- Kenya
- Republic of Korea
- Kosovo
- Moldova
- Mongolia
- Morocco
- Netherlands
- Nigeria
- Poland
- Romania
- Republic of Rwanda
- Senegal
- Slovakia
- Slovenia
- South Africa
- Sweden
- Turkey
- Ukraine
- United Arab Emirates
- United Kingdom
- United States of America
