= Centre for Climate Reporting =

Non-profit investigative journalism outlet

- Company type: Private
- Founded: 2022; 4 years ago
- Headquarters: Suffolk, England
- Founders: Lawrence Carter; Tom Costello
- Website: climate-reporting.org

The Centre for Climate Reporting (CCR) is a British non-profit investigative journalism outlet based in Mildenhall, Suffolk, that focuses on stories surrounding climate change. It is known for its undercover operations.

Three people worked for CCR as of December 2023, including co-founders Lawrence Carter and Tom Costello. It receives funding through grants, donations, and philanthropy. As of November 2025, its funders include the European Climate Foundation, KR Foundation, Meliore Foundation and Swiss Philanthropy Foundation.

== Background ==
CCR was incorporated on October 13, 2021, by journalist Lawrence Carter, and was "set up in early 2022".

In 2023, it, in collaboration with the BBC, reported on a plan by the United Arab Emirates and Sultan Al Jaber to use the 2023 United Nations Climate Change Conference for making oil deals. It also collaborated with Amy Westervelt and Drilled on an investigation into "petrostates". With The Guardian, it exposed a pattern of Wikipedia editing to cover up Al Jaber's conflict of interest as the owner of an oil company. In collaboration with Channel 4, employees from the centre went undercover in Saudi Arabia, and reported on secretive plans to increase oil dependency in developing nations in Asia and Africa.

In 2024, reporters from the centre posed as wealthy donors, working their way up to a meeting with Russell Vought of Project 2025. In the meeting, which was covertly recorded and published to YouTube, Vought was adamant that Donald Trump blessed the Heritage Foundation's work, despite Trump having publicly distanced himself from the project.
