= Thermal work limit =

Index for max metabolic rate in workers

Thermal work limit (TWL) is an index defined as the maximum sustainable metabolic rate that well-hydrated, acclimatized individuals can maintain in a specific thermal environment within a safe deep body core temperature (< 38.2 °C or 100.8 °F) and sweat rate (< 1.2 kg or 2.6 lb per hour). TWL recommends a maximum metabolic rate based on environment, clothing, and acclimatization to achieve thermal equilibrium within acceptable limits of the metabolic rate. The index is designed for self-paced workers and does not rely on estimation of actual metabolic rates. Self-paced workers are defined as those not subjected to excessive external pressure from other individuals or those offering financial incentives and are well informed of issues when working in the heat. The index has been introduced into the United Arab Emirates and Australia, resulting in a substantial fall in the incidence of heat illness in the latter.

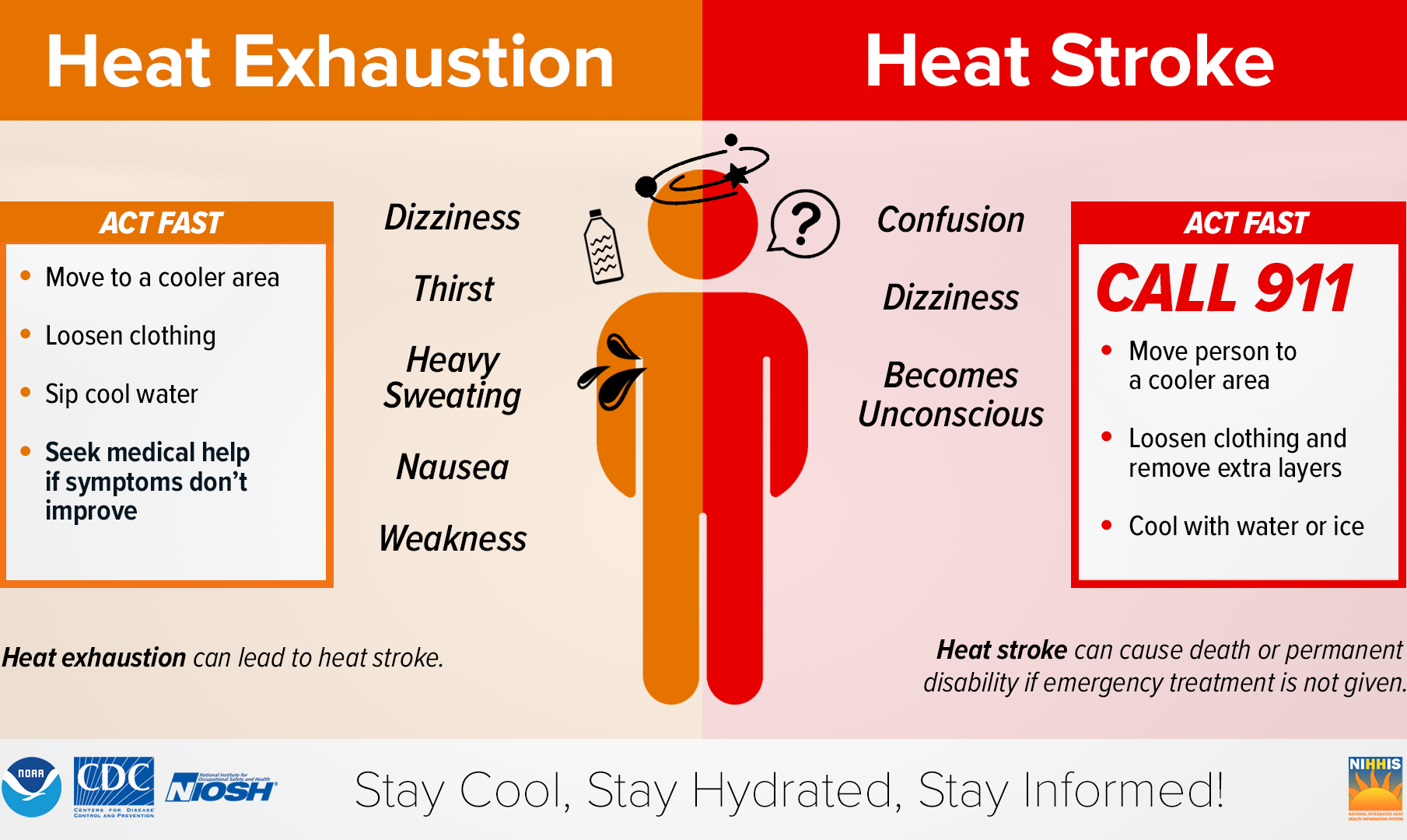
Heat Exhaustion vs Heat Stroke

== History ==
The idea of a thermal work limit (TWL) was developed by Graham Bates and Derrick Brake in 1997 to address limitations in earlier occupational heat-stress assessment methods, such as Wet-Bulb Globe Temperature (WBGT), that relied on metabolic approximations and fixed work-rest guidelines. TWL was presented in response to these limitations as a rational, more direct method in comparison to existing indices that were either overly conservative or insufficiently adaptive to work environments. Building onto the heat indices such as Wet-Bulb Globe Temperature and Predicted Heat-Stress (PHS), thermal work limit incorporates earlier research into human heat balance and adds factors such as moisture transfer between the body, clothing, and environment. TWL and its management protocols have been introduced into several industrial operations where workers are subject to thermal stress including mining and labor intense industries, like construction. TWL was first implemented into Australia and the UAE in the early 2010s after field testing in Abu Dhabi and Dubai demonstrated its effectiveness in reducing thermal stress while maintaining work productivity, which led to its adoption in various work safety and health policies. Since the introduction of TWL-based policies in the Australian mining industry, the amount of man-hours lost due to serious heat illness has fallen from 12 million to 6 million, and the amount lost due to all heat illness incidences has fallen from 31 million to 18 million.

== Theory ==
As a validated and rational heat index, the premise of TWL states that for any situation that involves environmental and clothing factors, heat that dissipates from the body has a maximum rate and thus has a limiting metabolic rate. The thermal work limit index calculates the maximum metabolic rate, in watts of metabolic heat per square meter of body surface area, that can be continuously expended in a particular thermal environment in order to keep the body within safe physiological limits. The TWL is an integrated measure of the dry-bulb, wet-bulb, atmospheric pressure, wind speed, and global temperature. From these variables and taking into consideration the type of clothing worn and the acclimatization state of the worker, the TWL predicts the maximum level of work that can be carried out in a given environment without workers exceeding a safe core body temperature 38.2 °C (100.8 °F) and sweat rate.

TWL is measured in watts per square meter and are categorized into four zones. Above <115 (High Risk, Restricted Zone), individuals are not permitted to work alone, unacclimatized persons cannot work, and workers can only perform essential maintenance and rescue operations. Between 115-140 (Medium Risk, Cautionary Zone) certain environmental factors will require additional precautions to reduce heat-stress, it is advised to avoid working alone and unacclimatized workers are not permitted to work. At 140-220 (Low Risk, Acclimatization Zone) workers that cannot ascertain their acclimatization status should avoid working alone. Below >220 (Unrestricted Zone) access to work is unrestricted and there are no limitations to self-paced work.

Sweat rates are also calculated, so the level of fluid replacement necessary to avoid dehydration can be calculated. The thermal work limit algorithm builds on work originated by Mitchell and Whillier who developed an index "specific cooling power", which subsequently became known as "air cooling power" (ACP). In the standard formula, the maximum sweat rate has a maximum of 0.67kg/m-²/hr-² (1.2 liters on average) which is within the sustainable limits of 0.83kg/m-²/hr-². For evaporation of sweat from the skin to occur the minimum possible skin temperature cannot fall below the ambient dew point temperature. The efficiency of sweat therefore falls into three zones: Zone A, at this zone the environment performance of sweat evaporation meaning sweat doesn't drip and therefore has an efficiency of 100 percent; Zone B, sweat dripping does occur but the skin isn't fully wet; and Zone C, the environment in this zone has a lower evaporation rate compared to sweat rate, causing the skin to get wet and dripping occurs.

The valid range for TWL is from resting (60 W/m-²) to 380 W/m-². Lastly this range was obtained from experiments performed C.H. Wyndham so it can be concluded that TWL is not valid when the dew point temperature is above the skin or clothing temperature. Also as the heat transfer equations used for clothing do not work with subjects in Encapsulating Protective Clothing (EPC) it can be assumed TWL is not valid where impermeable clothing is used.

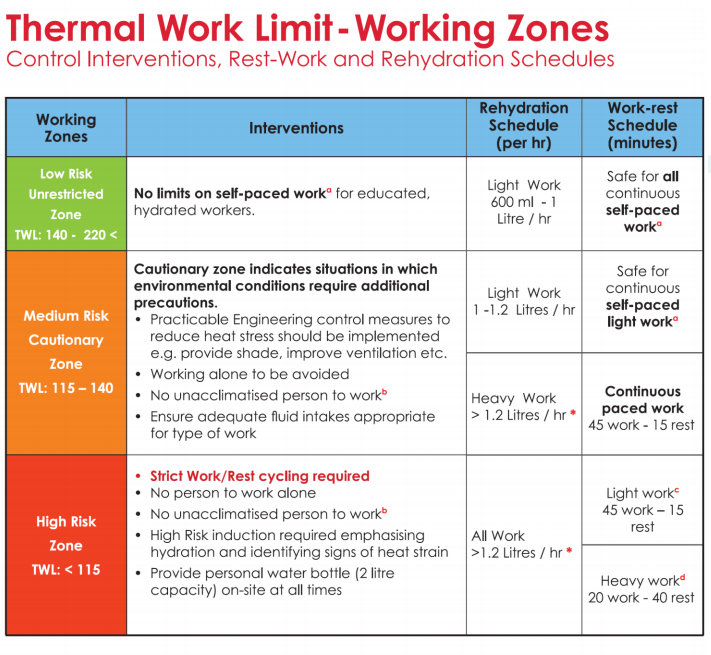
TWL calculation sheet, Abu Dhabi

== Implementation ==
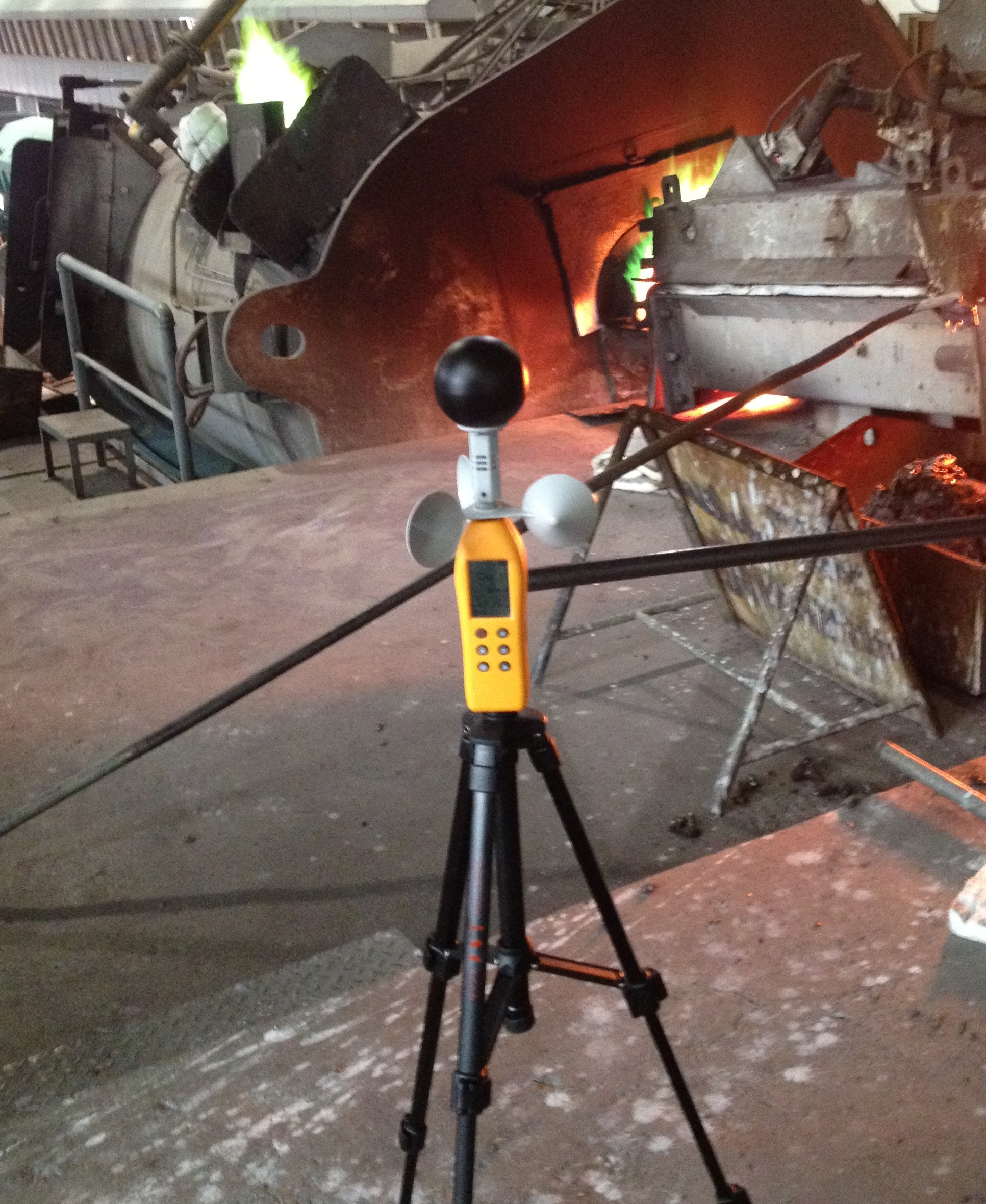
Thermal work limit application in the field

Thermal work limit has seen significant implementation in various industries, particularly in regions that experience extreme heat conditions; most notably Australia and the United Arab Emirates. In Australia, TWL has experienced widespread adoption into their government and organization policies, such as the Australian Institute of Occupation Hygienists and WorkSafe Western Australia citing TWL as one of three acceptable methods for assessing heat stress. Thermal work limit is heavily practiced in the mining industry in Australia where heat stress presents a significant threat to worker safety as ambient temperatures often exceed 30°C and one study found that over an 11 year period out of 1,128 injuries and illnesses, 151 were directly heat-related.

The TWL has also been included in the Abu Dhabi Occupational Safety and Health System Framework code of practice. The code of practice implements training procedure to ensure employee training complies with ADOSH-SF requirements. Employee's are trained to work in the heat and taught to recognize heat-related symptoms and how to prevent them. An outline for creating worksite heat-stress programs is also outlined including employee acclimatization and environmental assessment. If TWL is too low, then work cannot be carried out continuously.
