= Mandeni Local Municipality elections =

Local elections in KwaZulu-Natal, South Africa

The Mandeni Local Municipality (formerly eNdondakusuka Local Municipality) council consists of thirty-five members elected by mixed-member proportional representation. Eighteen councillors are elected by first-past-the-post voting in eighteen wards, while the remaining seventeen are chosen from party lists so that the total number of party representatives is proportional to the number of votes received.

In the election of 4 November 2026 the uMkhonto weSizwe Party (MKP) won a plurality of seventeen seats on the council.

== Results ==
The following table shows the composition of the council after past elections.

Event	AIC	ANC	DA	EFF	IFP	MKP	Other	Total
2000 election	—	12	2	—	18	—	0	32
2006 election	—	17	1	—	13	—	1	32
2011 election	—	23	1	—	4	—	6	34
2016 election	1	25	1	1	7	—	0	35
2021 election	1	19	1	4	10	—	0	35
2026 election	0	8	1	1	8	17	0	35

== December 2000 election ==
The following table shows the results of the 2000 election.

Party	Ward			List			Total seats
Party	Votes	%	Seats	Votes	%	Seats	Total seats
Inkatha Freedom Party	11,745	57.61	10	12,107	56.89	8	18
African National Congress	7,594	37.25	6	7,842	36.85	6	12
Democratic Alliance	841	4.13	0	976	4.59	2	2
African Christian Democratic Party	85	0.42	0	208	0.98	0	0
United Democratic Movement	48	0.24	0	148	0.70	0	0
Independent candidates	74	0.36	0				0
Total	20,387	100.00	16	21,281	100.00	16	32
Valid votes	20,387	97.94		21,281	97.90		
Invalid/blank votes	428	2.06		457	2.10		
Total votes	20,815	100.00		21,738	100.00		
Registered voters/turnout	54,207	38.40		54,207	40.10		

== March 2006 election ==
The following table shows the results of the 2006 election.

Party	Ward			List			Total seats
Party	Votes	%	Seats	Votes	%	Seats	Total seats
African National Congress	13,721	52.09	9	13,749	52.29	8	17
Inkatha Freedom Party	10,514	39.91	7	10,341	39.33	6	13
Ubumbano Lwesizwe Independent Residence Association	802	3.04	0	877	3.34	1	1
Democratic Alliance	796	3.02	0	785	2.99	1	1
National Democratic Convention	379	1.44	0	402	1.53	0	0
Minority Front	131	0.50	0	140	0.53	0	0
Total	26,343	100.00	16	26,294	100.00	16	32
Valid votes	26,343	98.25		26,294	97.99		
Invalid/blank votes	469	1.75		538	2.01		
Total votes	26,812	100.00		26,832	100.00		
Registered voters/turnout	56,283	47.64		56,283	47.67		

== May 2011 election ==
The following table shows the results of the 2011 election.

Party	Ward			List			Total seats
Party	Votes	%	Seats	Votes	%	Seats	Total seats
African National Congress	23,629	65.15	16	24,128	66.59	7	23
National Freedom Party	6,230	17.18	0	5,853	16.15	6	6
Inkatha Freedom Party	4,596	12.67	1	4,558	12.58	3	4
Democratic Alliance	1,125	3.10	0	1,081	2.98	1	1
African People's Convention	283	0.78	0	257	0.71	0	0
Azanian People's Organisation	154	0.42	0	160	0.44	0	0
African Christian Democratic Party	118	0.33	0	117	0.32	0	0
Congress of the People	134	0.37	0	81	0.22	0	0
Total	36,269	100.00	17	36,235	100.00	17	34
Valid votes	36,269	98.05		36,235	98.25		
Invalid/blank votes	720	1.95		647	1.75		
Total votes	36,989	100.00		36,882	100.00		
Registered voters/turnout	62,397	59.28		62,397	59.11		

== August 2016 election ==
The following table shows the results of the 2016 election.

Party	Ward			List			Total seats
Party	Votes	%	Seats	Votes	%	Seats	Total seats
African National Congress	31,892	72.44	17	30,842	70.42	8	25
Inkatha Freedom Party	8,797	19.98	1	8,372	19.12	6	7
Democratic Alliance	1,548	3.52	0	1,521	3.47	1	1
Economic Freedom Fighters	1,232	2.80	0	1,240	2.83	1	1
African Independent Congress	520	1.18	0	1,701	3.88	1	1
Academic Congress Union	34	0.08	0	120	0.27	0	0
Total	44,023	100.00	18	43,796	100.00	17	35
Valid votes	44,023	97.59		43,796	96.80		
Invalid/blank votes	1,088	2.41		1,450	3.20		
Total votes	45,111	100.00		45,246	100.00		
Registered voters/turnout	73,103	61.71		73,103	61.89		

== November 2021 election ==
The following table shows the results of the 2021 election.

Party	Ward			List			Total seats
Party	Votes	%	Seats	Votes	%	Seats	Total seats
African National Congress	17,418	51.40	16	17,930	52.82	3	19
Inkatha Freedom Party	8,832	26.06	2	9,307	27.42	8	10
Economic Freedom Fighters	3,453	10.19	0	3,647	10.74	4	4
Democratic Alliance	781	2.30	0	793	2.34	1	1
Independent candidates	1,512	4.46	0				0
African Independent Congress	652	1.92	0	680	2.00	1	1
Justice and Employment Party	248	0.73	0	413	1.22	0	0
African Transformation Movement	268	0.79	0	354	1.04	0	0
National Freedom Party	260	0.77	0	334	0.98	0	0
African Christian Democratic Party	164	0.48	0	164	0.48	0	0
Abantu Batho Congress	138	0.41	0	132	0.39	0	0
African Federal Convention	60	0.18	0	55	0.16	0	0
Al Jama-ah	50	0.15	0	38	0.11	0	0
African People's Movement	26	0.08	0	50	0.15	0	0
United Christian Democratic Party	27	0.08	0	48	0.14	0	0
Total	33,889	100.00	18	33,945	100.00	17	35
Valid votes	33,889	97.53		33,945	97.48		
Invalid/blank votes	860	2.47		876	2.52		
Total votes	34,749	100.00		34,821	100.00		
Registered voters/turnout	74,694	46.52		74,694	46.62		

=== By-elections from November 2021 ===
The following by-elections were held to fill vacant ward seats in the period since the election in November 2021.

Date	Ward	Party of the previous councillor	Party of the newly elected councillor
24 May 2023	15	African National Congress	African National Congress
30 Apr 2025	18	African National Congress	uMkhonto weSizwe
26 Nov 2025	17	African National Congress	uMkhonto weSizwe

== November 2026 election ==
The following table shows the results of the 2026 election.

Party	Ward			List			Total seats
Party	Votes	%	Seats	Votes	%	Seats	Total seats
uMkhonto weSizwe Party	22,105	47.84	16	22,696	49.13	1	17
African National Congress	10,101	21.86	0	9,860	21.34	8	8
Inkatha Freedom Party	9,956	21.55	2	9,630	20.85	6	8
Economic Freedom Fighters	1,234	2.67	0	1,172	2.54	1	1
Democratic Alliance	1,094	2.37	0	1,109	2.40	1	1
Independent Alliance	539	1.17	0	412	0.89	0	0
African Independent Congress	437	0.95	0	375	0.81	0	0
Mkhonto Ilembe Party	180	0.39	0	229	0.50	0	0
African Transformation Movement	129	0.28	0	147	0.32	0	0
National Freedom Party	153	0.33	0	116	0.25	0	0
Afrika Mayibuye Movement	97	0.21	0	82	0.18	0	0
South African Communist Party	69	0.15	0	104	0.23	0	0
United Christian Democratic Party	45	0.10	0	91	0.20	0	0
African Economic Freedom	47	0.10	0	81	0.18	0	0
African Renaissance Unity	17	0.04	0	90	0.19	0	0
Total	46,203	100.00	18	46,194	100.00	17	35
Valid votes	46,203	98.64		46,194	98.67		
Invalid/blank votes	635	1.36		622	1.33		
Total votes	46,838	100.00		46,816	100.00		
Registered voters/turnout	84,921	55.15		84,921	55.13		
