= UMhlathuze Local Municipality elections =

Local elections in KwaZulu-Natal, South Africa

The uMhlathuze Local Municipality council consists of sixty-seven members elected by mixed-member proportional representation. Thirty-four councillors are elected by first-past-the-post voting in thirty-four wards, while the remaining thirty-three are chosen from party lists so that the total number of party representatives is proportional to the number of votes received.

The municipality was enlarged at the time of the South African municipal election, 2016 when part of the disbanded Ntambanana Local Municipality was merged into it.

In the election of 3 August 2016 the African National Congress (ANC) won a majority of forty-three seats on the council.

In the 2026 South African municipal elections the uMkhonto weSizwe Party (MKP) won a plurality of twenty-seven seats on the council.

== Results ==
The following table shows the composition of the council after past elections.

Event	ACDP	ANC	DA	EFF	FF+	IFP	NFP	MKP	Other	Total
2000 election	1	19	9	—	—	30	—	—	1	60
2006 election	1	28	4	—	1	24	—	—	2	60
2011 election	0	36	6	—	0	10	6	—	2	60
2016 election	0	43	8	3	0	13	—	—	0	67
2021 election	1	27	8	6	1	23	1	—	0	67
2026 election	0	12	9	1	1	18	1	27	2	71

== December 2000 election ==
The following table shows the results of the 2000 election.

Party	Ward			List			Total seats
Party	Votes	%	Seats	Votes	%	Seats	Total seats
Inkatha Freedom Party	19,150	50.66	16	18,914	49.97	14	30
African National Congress	12,064	31.91	10	12,222	32.29	9	19
Democratic Alliance	5,168	13.67	4	5,595	14.78	5	9
African Christian Democratic Party	802	2.12	0	734	1.94	1	1
Pan Africanist Congress of Azania	372	0.98	0	228	0.60	1	1
United Democratic Movement	69	0.18	0	160	0.42	0	0
Independent candidates	176	0.47	0				0
Total	37,801	100.00	30	37,853	100.00	30	60
Valid votes	37,801	98.29		37,853	98.39		
Invalid/blank votes	656	1.71		618	1.61		
Total votes	38,457	100.00		38,471	100.00		
Registered voters/turnout	102,907	37.37		102,907	37.38		

== March 2006 election ==
The following table shows the results of the 2006 election.

Party	Ward			List			Total seats
Party	Votes	%	Seats	Votes	%	Seats	Total seats
African National Congress	25,743	46.45	18	26,134	47.26	10	28
Inkatha Freedom Party	21,997	39.69	10	22,451	40.60	14	24
Democratic Alliance	3,862	6.97	2	3,599	6.51	2	4
National Democratic Convention	2,155	3.89	0	1,803	3.26	2	2
African Christian Democratic Party	364	0.66	0	464	0.84	1	1
Freedom Front Plus	345	0.62	0	340	0.61	1	1
Pan Africanist Congress of Azania	286	0.52	0	293	0.53	0	0
Minority Front	230	0.42	0	211	0.38	0	0
Independent candidates	437	0.79	0				0
Total	55,419	100.00	30	55,295	100.00	30	60
Valid votes	55,419	98.37		55,295	98.33		
Invalid/blank votes	917	1.63		940	1.67		
Total votes	56,336	100.00		56,235	100.00		
Registered voters/turnout	122,237	46.09		122,237	46.00		

== May 2011 election ==
The following table shows the results of the 2011 election.

Party	Ward			List			Total seats
Party	Votes	%	Seats	Votes	%	Seats	Total seats
African National Congress	51,478	57.91	23	55,622	62.66	13	36
Inkatha Freedom Party	15,275	17.18	1	14,938	16.83	9	10
Democratic Alliance	8,560	9.63	4	9,060	10.21	2	6
National Freedom Party	8,551	9.62	0	8,246	9.29	6	6
Independent candidates	3,673	4.13	2				2
Freedom Front Plus	746	0.84	0	288	0.32	0	0
African Christian Democratic Party	441	0.50	0	428	0.48	0	0
South African Democratic Congress	164	0.18	0	182	0.21	0	0
Total	88,888	100.00	30	88,764	100.00	30	60
Valid votes	88,888	98.60		88,764	98.29		
Invalid/blank votes	1,259	1.40		1,546	1.71		
Total votes	90,147	100.00		90,310	100.00		
Registered voters/turnout	154,544	58.33		154,544	58.44		

== August 2016 election ==
The following table shows the results of the 1916 election.

Party	Ward			List			Total seats
Party	Votes	%	Seats	Votes	%	Seats	Total seats
African National Congress	72,737	62.91	30	74,587	64.63	13	43
Inkatha Freedom Party	21,937	18.97	1	21,512	18.64	12	13
Democratic Alliance	13,244	11.45	3	13,495	11.69	5	8
Economic Freedom Fighters	4,180	3.62	0	4,331	3.75	3	3
Independent candidates	2,546	2.20	0				0
Freedom Front Plus	492	0.43	0	570	0.49	0	0
African Christian Democratic Party	402	0.35	0	433	0.38	0	0
Isithunzi Som-Afrika Econo Fighters	84	0.07	0	486	0.42	0	0
Total	115,622	100.00	34	115,414	100.00	33	67
Valid votes	115,622	98.84		115,414	98.71		
Invalid/blank votes	1,355	1.16		1,511	1.29		
Total votes	116,977	100.00		116,925	100.00		
Registered voters/turnout	195,576	59.81		195,576	59.78		

== November 2021 election ==
The following table shows the results of the 2021 election.

Party	Ward			List			Total seats
Party	Votes	%	Seats	Votes	%	Seats	Total seats
African National Congress	33,827	40.33	20	32,396	38.67	7	27
Inkatha Freedom Party	28,714	34.23	10	29,303	34.98	13	23
Democratic Alliance	9,889	11.79	4	9,854	11.76	4	8
Economic Freedom Fighters	7,627	9.09	0	7,768	9.27	6	6
National Freedom Party	771	0.92	0	760	0.91	1	1
African Christian Democratic Party	713	0.85	0	729	0.87	1	1
Freedom Front Plus	541	0.64	0	608	0.73	1	1
African Independent Congress	27	0.03	0	876	1.05	0	0
Abantu Batho Congress	302	0.36	0	289	0.34	0	0
African People's Movement	300	0.36	0	286	0.34	0	0
Justice and Employment Party	240	0.29	0	316	0.38	0	0
Independent candidates	446	0.53	0				0
South Africa Vuka Movement	197	0.23	0	166	0.20	0	0
United Christian Democratic Party	118	0.14	0	79	0.09	0	0
Black First Land First	74	0.09	0	101	0.12	0	0
African Transformation Movement	45	0.05	0	123	0.15	0	0
United Independent Movement	11	0.01	0	91	0.11	0	0
Congregational Christian Unity	40	0.05	0	29	0.03	0	0
Total	83,882	100.00	34	83,774	100.00	33	67
Valid votes	83,882	98.71		83,774	98.64		
Invalid/blank votes	1,092	1.29		1,159	1.36		
Total votes	84,974	100.00		84,933	100.00		
Registered voters/turnout	192,916	44.05		192,916	44.03		

The African National Congress lost its majority, and an Inkatha Freedom Party (IFP) led coalition, supported by the Democratic Alliance (DA) and Economic Freedom Fighters (EFF), took control of the municipality. Nkonzoyakhe Donda (IFP) was elected mayor, Nkululeko Ngubane (EFF) deputy mayor and Tobias Gumede (IFP) Speaker.

=== By-elections from November 2021 ===
The following by-elections were held to fill vacant ward seats in the period from the election in November 2021.

Date	Ward	Party of the previous councillor	Party of the newly elected councillor
14 September 2022	12	African National Congress	Inkatha Freedom Party
27 September 2023	13	African National Congress	Inkatha Freedom Party

The 2022 by-election took place after the ANC representative, facing community pressure, resigned. With the victory, the IFP solidified its coalition hold on council.

After the assassination of an African Christian Democratic Party councillor, the ANC's ward 13 councillor resigned after a failed assassination attempt on his life, triggering a by-election in September 2023. The Inkatha Freedom Party (IFP) won the by-election, solidifying their governing coalition supported by the Democratic Alliance (DA), Freedom Front Plus (FF+) and ACDP, and no longer reliant on the Economic Freedom Fighters (EFF).

== November 2026 election ==
The following table shows the results of the 2026 election.

Party	Ward			List			Total seats
Party	Votes	%	Seats	Votes	%	Seats	Total seats
uMkhonto weSizwe Party	41,807	36.83	23	44,312	38.97	4	27
Inkatha Freedom Party	27,886	24.57	6	27,833	24.48	12	18
African National Congress	19,982	17.60	2	17,935	15.77	10	12
Democratic Alliance	13,328	11.74	5	13,436	11.82	4	9
ActionSA	2,250	1.98	0	2,607	2.29	2	2
Economic Freedom Fighters	2,218	1.95	0	2,092	1.84	1	1
Freedom Front Plus	1,644	1.45	0	1,686	1.48	1	1
National Freedom Party	1,055	0.93	0	1,074	0.94	1	1
African Christian Democratic Party	551	0.49	0	622	0.55	0	0
South African Communist Party	516	0.45	0	532	0.47	0	0
Independent candidates	687	0.61	0				0
Afrika Mayibuye Movement	290	0.26	0	260	0.23	0	0
Independent Alliance	230	0.20	0	301	0.26	0	0
African Transformation Movement	189	0.17	0	269	0.24	0	0
African Movement Congress	209	0.18	0	159	0.14	0	0
National Peoples Ambassadors	169	0.15	0	136	0.12	0	0
Active Citizens Coalition	140	0.12	0	121	0.11	0	0
African Economic Freedom	102	0.09	0	98	0.09	0	0
United Christian Democratic Party	58	0.05	0	92	0.08	0	0
African Restoration Movement	71	0.06	0	70	0.06	0	0
Gods Justice and Development Party	48	0.04	0	37	0.03	0	0
Congregational Christian Unity	74	0.07	0				0
Umkhumbi Wesizwe Organisation				46	0.04	0	0
African Renaissance Unity	13	0.01	0				0
Total	113,517	100.00	36	113,718	100.00	35	71
Valid votes	113,517	99.13		113,718	99.13		
Invalid/blank votes	993	0.87		999	0.87		
Total votes	114,510	100.00		114,717	100.00		
Registered voters/turnout	218,080	52.51		218,080	52.60		
