= Dannhauser Local Municipality elections =

Local elections in KwaZulu-Natal, South Africa

The Dannhauser Local Municipality council consists of twenty-five members elected by mixed-member proportional representation. Thirteen councillors are elected by first-past-the-post voting in thirteen wards, while the remaining twelve are chosen from party lists so that the total number of party representatives is proportional to the number of votes received.

In the election of 3 August 2016 the African National Congress (ANC) won a majority of fourteen seats on the council.

In the election of 1 November 2021 the African National Congress (ANC) lost its majority, winning a plurality of nine seats on the council.

In the election of 4 November 2026 the African National Congress, no party won a majority. The Inkatha Freedom Party and uMkhonto weSizwe Party both won seven seats.

== Results ==
The following table shows the composition of the council after past elections.

Event	ANC	DA	EFF	IFP	MKP	Other	Total
2000 election	4	2	—	14	—	0	20
2006 election	7	1	—	10	—	2	20
2011 election	10	1	—	6	—	4	25
2016 election	14	1	1	8	—	1	25
2021 election	9	1	3	8	—	4	25
2026 election	5	1	1	7	7	4	25

== December 2000 election ==
The following table shows the results of the 2000 election.

Party	Ward			List			Total seats
Party	Votes	%	Seats	Votes	%	Seats	Total seats
Inkatha Freedom Party	10,609	68.50	10	10,669	68.73	4	14
African National Congress	3,125	20.18	0	3,014	19.42	4	4
Democratic Alliance	1,282	8.28	0	1,578	10.17	2	2
Independent candidates	372	2.40	0				0
African Christian Democratic Party	99	0.64	0	262	1.69	0	0
Total	15,487	100.00	10	15,523	100.00	10	20
Valid votes	15,487	97.48		15,523	97.33		
Invalid/blank votes	400	2.52		426	2.67		
Total votes	15,887	100.00		15,949	100.00		
Registered voters/turnout	34,221	46.42		34,221	46.61		

== March 2006 election ==
The following table shows the results of the 2006 election.

Party	Ward			List			Total seats
Party	Votes	%	Seats	Votes	%	Seats	Total seats
Inkatha Freedom Party	8,357	49.43	7	8,377	49.59	3	10
African National Congress	6,102	36.09	3	6,123	36.25	4	7
Democratic Alliance	1,007	5.96	0	982	5.81	1	1
National Democratic Convention	948	5.61	0	872	5.16	1	1
Royal Loyal Progress	313	1.85	0	361	2.14	1	1
African Christian Democratic Party	180	1.06	0	176	1.04	0	0
Total	16,907	100.00	10	16,891	100.00	10	20
Valid votes	16,907	98.03		16,891	97.76		
Invalid/blank votes	340	1.97		387	2.24		
Total votes	17,247	100.00		17,278	100.00		
Registered voters/turnout	35,692	48.32		35,692	48.41		

== May 2011 election ==
The following table shows the results of the 2011 election.

Party	Ward			List			Total seats
Party	Votes	%	Seats	Votes	%	Seats	Total seats
African National Congress	11,784	48.41	11	12,076	49.79	−1	10
Inkatha Freedom Party	6,770	27.81	0	6,515	26.86	6	6
National Freedom Party	2,930	12.04	0	2,702	11.14	3	3
Azanian People's Organisation	1,090	4.48	0	1,003	4.14	1	1
Democratic Alliance	767	3.15	0	788	3.25	1	1
Congress of the People	390	1.60	0	342	1.41	0	0
Royal Loyal Progress	177	0.73	0	356	1.47	0	0
Federal Congress	233	0.96	0	299	1.23	0	0
Great Kongress of South Africa	201	0.83	0	172	0.71	0	0
Total	24,342	100.00	11	24,253	100.00	10	21
Valid votes	24,342	97.99		24,253	97.88		
Invalid/blank votes	500	2.01		525	2.12		
Total votes	24,842	100.00		24,778	100.00		
Registered voters/turnout	40,545	61.27		40,545	61.11		

== August 2016 election ==
The following table shows the results of the 2016 election.

Party	Ward			List			Total seats
Party	Votes	%	Seats	Votes	%	Seats	Total seats
African National Congress	16,588	56.39	10	16,833	57.65	4	14
Inkatha Freedom Party	9,258	31.47	3	8,920	30.55	5	8
Economic Freedom Fighters	1,483	5.04	0	1,507	5.16	1	1
Democratic Alliance	1,368	4.65	0	1,385	4.74	1	1
Royal Loyal Progress	345	1.17	0	384	1.32	1	1
Azanian People's Organisation	140	0.48	0	172	0.59	0	0
Independent candidates	233	0.79	0				0
Total	29,415	100.00	13	29,201	100.00	12	25
Valid votes	29,415	98.11		29,201	98.07		
Invalid/blank votes	566	1.89		575	1.93		
Total votes	29,981	100.00		29,776	100.00		
Registered voters/turnout	50,834	58.98		50,834	58.57		

== November 2021 election ==
The following table shows the results of the 2021 election.

Party	Ward			List			Total seats
Party	Votes	%	Seats	Votes	%	Seats	Total seats
African National Congress	8,060	34.18	6	8,506	35.75	3	9
Inkatha Freedom Party	6,951	29.47	6	7,875	33.10	2	8
Economic Freedom Fighters	2,320	9.84	0	2,584	10.86	3	3
Abantu Batho Congress	1,306	5.54	0	1,156	4.86	1	1
Team Sugar South Africa	659	2.79	0	723	3.04	1	1
Independent candidates	1,350	5.72	1				1
Community Freedom Party	605	2.57	0	512	2.15	1	1
Democratic Alliance	431	1.83	0	528	2.22	1	1
African Christian Democratic Party	398	1.69	0	395	1.66	0	0
African Freedom Revolution	382	1.62	0	326	1.37	0	0
African People's Movement	301	1.28	0	317	1.33	0	0
National Freedom Party	223	0.95	0	238	1.00	0	0
KZN Independence	160	0.68	0	194	0.82	0	0
Forum for Service Delivery	153	0.65	0	132	0.55	0	0
Patriotic Alliance	96	0.41	0	124	0.52	0	0
African Mantungwa Community	63	0.27	0	64	0.27	0	0
African Transformation Movement	62	0.26	0	62	0.26	0	0
Royal Loyal Progress	64	0.27	0	58	0.24	0	0
Total	23,584	100.00	13	23,794	100.00	12	25
Valid votes	23,584	97.66		23,794	97.65		
Invalid/blank votes	564	2.34		573	2.35		
Total votes	24,148	100.00		24,367	100.00		
Registered voters/turnout	50,480	47.84		50,480	48.27		

=== By-elections from November 2021 ===
The following by-elections were held to fill vacant ward seats in the period since the election in November 2021.

Date	Ward	Party of the previous councillor	Party of the newly elected councillor
22 March 2023	12	Independent politician	Inkatha Freedom Party

In a by-election in ward 12, held on 22 March 2023 after the resignation of the previous independent councillor, the Inkatha Freedom Party (IFP) won the seat. Prior to the resignation, the IFP controlled the council with support from the Economic Freedom Fighters (EFF), Team Sugar (TS), the Democratic Alliance (DA), Abantu Batho Congress (ABC) and the Community Freedom Party (CFP). The EFF withdrew its support, resulting in a hung council, and with this victory the IFP grouping took control once more.

== November 2026 election ==
The following table shows the results of the 2026 election.

Party	Ward			List			Total seats
Party	Votes	%	Seats	Votes	%	Seats	Total seats
uMkhonto weSizwe Party	8,537	28.32	7	9,117	30.14	0	7
Inkatha Freedom Party	7,842	26.01	5	7,807	25.81	2	7
African National Congress	5,446	18.06	1	5,413	17.89	4	5
Democratic Alliance	1,347	4.47	0	1,403	4.64	1	1
ActionSA	922	3.06	0	903	2.99	1	1
Sisonke Solidarity Movement	840	2.79	0	797	2.63	1	1
Majuba Progressive Movement	730	2.42	0	727	2.40	1	1
Economic Freedom Fighters	717	2.38	0	626	2.07	1	1
Amandla Awethu Movement	630	2.09	0	612	2.02	1	1
Community Freedom Party	399	1.32	0	364	1.20	0	0
Afrika Mayibuye Movement	411	1.36	0	340	1.12	0	0
International Revelation Congress	337	1.12	0	366	1.21	0	0
Newcastle and District Residents Forum	308	1.02	0	265	0.88	0	0
South African Communist Party	217	0.72	0	170	0.56	0	0
Freedom Front Plus	191	0.63	0	190	0.63	0	0
Insika Yesizwe Party	149	0.49	0	230	0.76	0	0
National Freedom Party	198	0.66	0	135	0.45	0	0
People's Voice Party	140	0.46	0	177	0.59	0	0
African Transformation Movement	101	0.33	0	120	0.40	0	0
Independent Alliance	82	0.27	0	129	0.43	0	0
KZN Independence	91	0.30	0	74	0.24	0	0
Women and Youth Organisation	79	0.26	0	85	0.28	0	0
Independent candidates	151	0.50	0				0
African Christian Democratic Party	71	0.24	0	53	0.18	0	0
Al Jama-ah	47	0.16	0	68	0.22	0	0
African Renaissance Unity	101	0.33	0				0
Service Delivery Party	32	0.11	0	37	0.12	0	0
African Movement Congress	16	0.05	0	41	0.14	0	0
South Africa for South Africans	18	0.06	0				0
Total	30,150	100.00	13	30,249	100.00	12	25
Valid votes	30,150	97.18		30,249	97.37		
Invalid/blank votes	875	2.82		818	2.63		
Total votes	31,025	100.00		31,067	100.00		
Registered voters/turnout	57,185	54.25		57,185	54.33		
