= KwaDukuza Local Municipality elections =

Local elections in KwaZulu-Natal, South Africa

The KwaDukuza Local Municipality council consists of fifty-nine members elected by mixed-member proportional representation. Thirty councillors are elected by first-past-the-post voting in thirty wards, while the remaining twenty-nine are chosen from party lists so that the total number of party representatives is proportional to the number of votes received.

In the election of 4 November 2026 the uMkhonto weSizwe Party (MKP) obtained a plurality of twenty-two seats on the council.

== Results ==
The following table shows the composition of the council after past elections.

Event	ACDP	AIC	ANC	DA	EFF	IFP	MF	MKP	Other	Total
2000 election	—	—	21	7	—	7	1	—	1	37
2006 election	0	—	27	5	—	7	1	—	0	40
2011 election	1	—	37	8	—	4	1	—	2	53
2016 election	0	1	36	11	2	4	0	—	3	57
2021 election	1	1	29	9	4	4	-	—	11	59
2026 election	0	1	14	14	1	4	0	22	3	59

== December 2000 election ==
The following table shows the results of the 2000 election.

Party	Ward			List			Total seats
Party	Votes	%	Seats	Votes	%	Seats	Total seats
African National Congress	17,507	55.81	14	17,522	56.14	7	21
Inkatha Freedom Party	5,987	19.09	2	6,117	19.60	5	7
Democratic Alliance	5,517	17.59	2	6,558	21.01	5	7
Independent candidates	1,430	4.56	1				1
Minority Front	614	1.96	0	609	1.95	1	1
Dube Civic Organisation	315	1.00	0	408	1.31	0	0
Total	31,370	100.00	19	31,214	100.00	18	37
Valid votes	31,370	96.97		31,214	96.57		
Invalid/blank votes	981	3.03		1,109	3.43		
Total votes	32,351	100.00		32,323	100.00		
Registered voters/turnout	64,718	49.99		64,718	49.94		

== March 2006 election ==
The following table shows the results of the 2006 election.

Party	Ward			List			Total seats
Party	Votes	%	Seats	Votes	%	Seats	Total seats
African National Congress	26,821	64.10	18	27,652	66.49	9	27
Inkatha Freedom Party	7,229	17.28	1	7,308	17.57	6	7
Democratic Alliance	4,811	11.50	1	4,874	11.72	4	5
Independent candidates	1,857	4.44	0				0
Minority Front	444	1.06	0	585	1.41	1	1
Independent Democrats	331	0.79	0	427	1.03	0	0
African Christian Democratic Party	277	0.66	0	395	0.95	0	0
Ubumbano Lwesizwe Independent Residence Association	73	0.17	0	349	0.84	0	0
Total	41,843	100.00	20	41,590	100.00	20	40
Valid votes	41,843	97.22		41,590	96.93		
Invalid/blank votes	1,195	2.78		1,318	3.07		
Total votes	43,038	100.00		42,908	100.00		
Registered voters/turnout	77,353	55.64		77,353	55.47		

== May 2011 election ==
The following table shows the results of the 2011 election.

Party	Ward			List			Total seats
Party	Votes	%	Seats	Votes	%	Seats	Total seats
African National Congress	42,800	67.13	22	45,281	70.66	15	37
Democratic Alliance	8,489	13.31	4	9,467	14.77	4	8
Inkatha Freedom Party	4,829	7.57	1	4,681	7.30	3	4
National Freedom Party	2,328	3.65	0	2,331	3.64	2	2
Independent candidates	2,966	4.65	0				0
African Christian Democratic Party	1,296	2.03	0	1,193	1.86	1	1
Minority Front	645	1.01	0	667	1.04	1	1
Congress of the People	398	0.62	0	388	0.61	0	0
Federal Congress	7	0.01	0	77	0.12	0	0
Total	63,758	100.00	27	64,085	100.00	26	53
Valid votes	63,758	97.86		64,085	98.20		
Invalid/blank votes	1,392	2.14		1,173	1.80		
Total votes	65,150	100.00		65,258	100.00		
Registered voters/turnout	103,240	63.11		103,240	63.21		

== August 2016 election ==
The following table shows the results of the 2016 election.

Party	Ward			List			Total seats
Party	Votes	%	Seats	Votes	%	Seats	Total seats
African National Congress	52,383	62.76	22	53,912	64.55	14	36
Democratic Alliance	15,690	18.80	4	16,708	20.01	7	11
Inkatha Freedom Party	5,156	6.18	1	5,350	6.41	3	4
Economic Freedom Fighters	2,852	3.42	0	3,293	3.94	2	2
Independent candidates	5,218	6.25	2				2
African Independent Congress	424	0.51	0	2,278	2.73	1	1
Al Jama-ah	556	0.67	0	585	0.70	1	1
African Christian Democratic Party	564	0.68	0	562	0.67	0	0
People's Revolutionary Movement	302	0.36	0	383	0.46	0	0
Minority Front	185	0.22	0	219	0.26	0	0
Democratic Liberal Congress	96	0.12	0	92	0.11	0	0
United Democratic Movement	34	0.04	0	134	0.16	0	0
Total	83,460	100.00	29	83,516	100.00	28	57
Valid votes	83,460	97.96		83,516	97.23		
Invalid/blank votes	1,736	2.04		2,376	2.77		
Total votes	85,196	100.00		85,892	100.00		
Registered voters/turnout	128,474	66.31		128,474	66.86		

== November 2021 election ==
The following table shows the results of the 2021 election.

Party	Ward			List			Total seats
Party	Votes	%	Seats	Votes	%	Seats	Total seats
African National Congress	35,754	49.57	27	35,752	49.55	2	29
Democratic Alliance	11,054	15.32	3	11,288	15.64	6	9
ActionSA	5,516	7.65	0	5,812	8.05	5	5
Independent Alliance	5,797	8.04	0	5,084	7.05	5	5
Economic Freedom Fighters	4,832	6.70	0	4,938	6.84	4	4
Inkatha Freedom Party	4,358	6.04	0	4,836	6.70	4	4
African Independent Congress	1,216	1.69	0	1,343	1.86	1	1
African Transformation Movement	640	0.89	0	579	0.80	1	1
African Christian Democratic Party	476	0.66	0	534	0.74	1	1
Abantu Batho Congress	400	0.55	0	405	0.56	0	0
Independent candidates	792	1.10	0				0
Al Jama-ah	322	0.45	0	385	0.53	0	0
Justice and Employment Party	299	0.41	0	394	0.55	0	0
Freedom Front Plus	221	0.31	0	215	0.30	0	0
African People's Movement	207	0.29	0	215	0.30	0	0
National Freedom Party	122	0.17	0	175	0.24	0	0
African Freedom Revolution	74	0.10	0	115	0.16	0	0
African People First	55	0.08	0	84	0.12	0	0
Total	72,135	100.00	30	72,154	100.00	29	59
Valid votes	72,135	97.82		72,154	97.70		
Invalid/blank votes	1,606	2.18		1,698	2.30		
Total votes	73,741	100.00		73,852	100.00		
Registered voters/turnout	136,781	53.91		136,781	53.99		

=== By-elections from November 2021 ===
The following by-elections were held to fill vacant ward seats in the period since November 2021.

Date	Ward	Party of the previous councillor	Party of the newly elected councillor
11 Sep 2024	6	Democratic Alliance	Democratic Alliance
2 Apr 2025	28	African National Congress	uMkhonto weSizwe

== November 2026 election ==
The following table shows the results of the 2026 election.

Party	Ward			List			Total seats
Party	Votes	%	Seats	Votes	%	Seats	Total seats
uMkhonto weSizwe Party	35,657	36.03	17	36,442	36.71	5	22
African National Congress	23,691	23.94	5	23,366	23.54	9	14
Democratic Alliance	22,328	22.56	7	23,154	23.32	7	14
Inkatha Freedom Party	6,213	6.28	0	6,179	6.22	4	4
Independent Alliance	4,155	4.20	1	3,769	3.80	1	2
Economic Freedom Fighters	1,142	1.15	0	1,292	1.30	1	1
ActionSA	1,004	1.01	0	1,209	1.22	1	1
African Independent Congress	784	0.79	0	840	0.85	1	1
Freedom Front Plus	595	0.60	0	658	0.66	0	0
African Transformation Movement	482	0.49	0	595	0.60	0	0
Independent candidates	943	0.95	0				0
African Christian Democratic Party	411	0.42	0	484	0.49	0	0
National Freedom Party	428	0.43	0	412	0.41	0	0
South African Communist Party	283	0.29	0	259	0.26	0	0
KZN Independence	184	0.19	0	133	0.13	0	0
Afrika Mayibuye Movement	188	0.19	0	107	0.11	0	0
Service Delivery Party	162	0.16	0	127	0.13	0	0
Minority Front	125	0.13	0	89	0.09	0	0
Active Citizens Coalition	100	0.10	0	89	0.09	0	0
Al Jama-ah	100	0.10	0	74	0.07	0	0
Total	98,975	100.00	30	99,278	100.00	29	59
Valid votes	98,975	98.77		99,278	98.90		
Invalid/blank votes	1,232	1.23		1,101	1.10		
Total votes	100,207	100.00		100,379	100.00		
Registered voters/turnout	168,072	59.62		168,072	59.72		
