= Newcastle Local Municipality elections =

Local elections in KwaZulu-Natal, South Africa

The Newcastle Local Municipality council consists of seventy-one members elected by mixed-member proportional representation. Thirty-six councillors are elected by first-past-the-post voting in thirty-six wards, while the remaining thirty-five are chosen from party lists so that the total number of party representatives is proportional to the number of votes received.

In the election of 4 November 2026 the uMkhonto weSizwe Party won a plurality of 23 seats.

== Results ==
The following table shows the composition of the council after past elections.

Event	ACDP	ANC	DA	EFF	FF+	IFP	NFP	MKP	Other	Total
2000 election	1	20	11	—	—	27	—	—	2	61
2006 election	1	27	6	—	1	20	—	—	6	61
2011 election	0	33	5	—	0	12	5	—	6	61
2016 election	0	41	6	5	1	11	—	—	3	67
2021 election	—	22	5	8	1	18	1	—	12	67
2026 election	—	10	7	2	1	15	1	23	12	71

== December 2000 election ==
The following table shows the results of the 2000 election.

Party	Ward			List			Total seats
Party	Votes	%	Seats	Votes	%	Seats	Total seats
Inkatha Freedom Party	20,367	43.95	22	20,083	43.27	5	27
African National Congress	15,387	33.20	5	15,323	33.01	15	20
Democratic Alliance	7,753	16.73	4	8,490	18.29	7	11
Azanian People's Organisation	711	1.53	0	823	1.77	1	1
Independent candidates	1,437	3.10	0				0
African Christian Democratic Party	243	0.52	0	655	1.41	1	1
Pan Africanist Congress of Azania	260	0.56	0	495	1.07	1	1
Minority Front	183	0.39	0	547	1.18	0	0
Total	46,341	100.00	31	46,416	100.00	30	61
Valid votes	46,341	97.47		46,416	97.51		
Invalid/blank votes	1,202	2.53		1,186	2.49		
Total votes	47,543	100.00		47,602	100.00		
Registered voters/turnout	115,803	41.06		115,803	41.11		

== March 2006 election ==
The following table shows the results of the 2006 election.

Party	Ward			List			Total seats
Party	Votes	%	Seats	Votes	%	Seats	Total seats
African National Congress	24,822	43.71	21	25,511	44.90	6	27
Inkatha Freedom Party	17,909	31.53	6	18,107	31.87	14	20
Democratic Alliance	5,095	8.97	3	5,377	9.46	3	6
National Democratic Convention	3,771	6.64	1	3,170	5.58	3	4
Royal Loyal Progress	1,218	2.14	0	1,289	2.27	1	1
African Christian Democratic Party	753	1.33	0	997	1.75	1	1
Independent candidates	1,163	2.05	0				0
Independent Democrats	576	1.01	0	577	1.02	1	1
Freedom Front Plus	459	0.81	0	508	0.89	1	1
Pan Africanist Congress of Azania	452	0.80	0	506	0.89	0	0
Azanian People's Organisation	374	0.66	0	517	0.91	0	0
Minority Front	202	0.36	0	253	0.45	0	0
Total	56,794	100.00	31	56,812	100.00	30	61
Valid votes	56,794	97.61		56,812	97.51		
Invalid/blank votes	1,391	2.39		1,448	2.49		
Total votes	58,185	100.00		58,260	100.00		
Registered voters/turnout	126,693	45.93		126,693	45.99		

== May 2011 election ==
The following table shows the results of the 2011 election.

Party	Ward			List			Total seats
Party	Votes	%	Seats	Votes	%	Seats	Total seats
African National Congress	45,786	52.22	28	47,625	54.31	5	33
Inkatha Freedom Party	16,415	18.72	1	16,397	18.70	11	12
National Freedom Party	7,802	8.90	0	7,313	8.34	5	5
Democratic Alliance	6,466	7.38	2	6,992	7.97	3	5
Azanian People's Organisation	3,908	4.46	0	3,624	4.13	3	3
Royal Loyal Progress	2,046	2.33	0	1,878	2.14	2	2
Federal Congress	1,716	1.96	0	1,575	1.80	1	1
Independent candidates	1,105	1.26	0				0
Freedom Front Plus	603	0.69	0	408	0.47	0	0
Minority Front	334	0.38	0	560	0.64	0	0
Great Kongress of South Africa	448	0.51	0	350	0.40	0	0
Congress of the People	312	0.36	0	329	0.38	0	0
African Christian Democratic Party	322	0.37	0	310	0.35	0	0
United Democratic Movement	340	0.39	0	261	0.30	0	0
South African Determined Volunteers	68	0.08	0	66	0.08	0	0
Total	87,671	100.00	31	87,688	100.00	30	61
Valid votes	87,671	98.10		87,688	98.15		
Invalid/blank votes	1,700	1.90		1,655	1.85		
Total votes	89,371	100.00		89,343	100.00		
Registered voters/turnout	149,136	59.93		149,136	59.91		

== August 2016 election ==
The following table shows the results of the 2016 election.

Party	Ward			List			Total seats
Party	Votes	%	Seats	Votes	%	Seats	Total seats
African National Congress	63,352	59.87	32	66,149	62.52	9	41
Inkatha Freedom Party	18,210	17.21	0	17,298	16.35	11	11
Democratic Alliance	9,587	9.06	2	9,993	9.45	4	6
Economic Freedom Fighters	8,074	7.63	0	8,128	7.68	5	5
Royal Loyal Progress	1,522	1.44	0	1,437	1.36	1	1
Independent candidates	2,379	2.25	0				0
Azanian People's Organisation	813	0.77	0	801	0.76	1	1
People's Revolutionary Movement	721	0.68	0	850	0.80	1	1
Freedom Front Plus	774	0.73	0	764	0.72	1	1
African Christian Democratic Party	376	0.36	0	381	0.36	0	0
Total	105,808	100.00	34	105,801	100.00	33	67
Valid votes	105,808	98.28		105,801	98.31		
Invalid/blank votes	1,849	1.72		1,821	1.69		
Total votes	107,657	100.00		107,622	100.00		
Registered voters/turnout	183,353	58.72		183,353	58.70		

=== August 2016 to November 2021 by-elections ===
In a by-election held on 5 April 2017, a ward previously held by the ANC was won by an independent candidate. Council composition was reconfigured as seen below:

Party	Ward	PR list	Total
African National Congress	31	9	40
Inkatha Freedom Party	0	11	11
DA	2	4	6
Economic Freedom Fighters	0	5	5
AZAPO	0	1	1
VF+	0	1	1
Independent	1	–	1
People's Revolutionary Movement	0	1	1
Royal Loyal Progress	0	1	1
Total	34	33	67

== November 2021 election ==
The following table shows the results of the 2021 election.

Party	Ward			List			Total seats
Party	Votes	%	Seats	Votes	%	Seats	Total seats
African National Congress	25,019	30.84	21	25,658	31.76	1	22
Inkatha Freedom Party	19,518	24.06	6	21,712	26.88	12	18
Economic Freedom Fighters	9,746	12.01	0	9,775	12.10	8	8
Team Sugar South Africa	8,167	10.07	2	8,541	10.57	5	7
Democratic Alliance	6,146	7.58	4	6,109	7.56	1	5
ActionSA	2,772	3.42	1	2,898	3.59	2	3
Independent candidates	3,855	4.75	0				0
Freedom Front Plus	990	1.22	0	978	1.21	1	1
National Freedom Party	846	1.04	0	966	1.20	1	1
Patriotic Alliance	614	0.76	0	560	0.69	1	1
African Transformation Movement	467	0.58	0	499	0.62	1	1
Abantu Batho Congress	526	0.65	0	356	0.44	0	0
People's Revolutionary Movement	442	0.54	0	385	0.48	0	0
African Freedom Revolution	397	0.49	0	404	0.50	0	0
Royal Loyal Progress	364	0.45	0	339	0.42	0	0
KZN Independence	154	0.19	0	447	0.55	0	0
Al Jama-ah	165	0.20	0	165	0.20	0	0
Azanian People's Organisation	132	0.16	0	181	0.22	0	0
Congress of the People	136	0.17	0	142	0.18	0	0
Community Freedom Party	175	0.22	0	92	0.11	0	0
African People's Movement	141	0.17	0	111	0.14	0	0
Pan Africanist Congress of Azania	90	0.11	0	157	0.19	0	0
African Mantungwa Community	110	0.14	0	130	0.16	0	0
African People's Convention	105	0.13	0	73	0.09	0	0
National Democratic Convention	30	0.04	0	41	0.05	0	0
Black First Land First	9	0.01	0	37	0.05	0	0
Bolsheviks Party of South Africa	1	0.00	0	24	0.03	0	0
Total	81,117	100.00	34	80,780	100.00	33	67
Valid votes	81,117	97.90		80,780	97.89		
Invalid/blank votes	1,740	2.10		1,741	2.11		
Total votes	82,857	100.00		82,521	100.00		
Registered voters/turnout	181,563	45.64		181,563	45.45		

A coalition was formed between the IFP, Team Sugar, DA, ActionSA and the FF+ to keep the ANC out. The IFP as the largest party in the coalition took the position of Mayor (Xolani Dube) and Speaker of council (Thengi Zulu), while Team Sugar took the deputy mayor position (Musa Thwala), ActionSA the Chief whip position (Faizel Cassim) and the DA were given MPAC (Municipal Public Accounts Committee).

=== By-elections from November 2021 ===
The following by-elections were held to fill vacant ward seats in the period since the election in November 2021.

Date	Ward	Party of the previous councillor	Party of the newly elected councillor
15 February 2023	31	Team Sugar South Africa	Team Sugar South Africa
14 February 2024	11	African National Congress	Inkatha Freedom Party
13 March 2024	12	African National Congress	Inkatha Freedom Party
13 March 2024	19	African National Congress	Inkatha Freedom Party
13 March 2024	23	African National Congress	Inkatha Freedom Party
19 June 2024	5	African National Congress	Democratic Alliance
17 July 2024	28	Team Sugar South Africa	Inkatha Freedom Party

After the three March by-elections, and the February by-election, the IFP had won four seats from the ANC, leaving them as the largest party, while in June 2024 the DA won a seat off the ANC. The following shows the composition of the council after the July 2024 by-election:

Party	Ward	List	Total
Inkatha Freedom Party	11	12	23
African National Congress	16	1	17
Economic Freedom Fighters	0	8	8
Team Sugar South Africa	1	5	6
Democratic Alliance	5	1	6
ActionSA	1	2	3
Freedom Front Plus	0	1	1
National Freedom Party	0	1	1
Patriotic Alliance	0	1	1
African Transformation Movement	0	1	1
Total	34	33	67

== November 2026 election ==
The following table shows the results of the 2026 election.

Party	Ward			List			Total seats
Party	Votes	%	Seats	Votes	%	Seats	Total seats
uMkhonto weSizwe Party	32,303	30.96	23	34,689	33.28	0	23
Inkatha Freedom Party	21,341	20.45	5	21,001	20.15	10	15
African National Congress	14,959	14.33	3	14,193	13.62	7	10
Democratic Alliance	9,936	9.52	3	10,342	9.92	4	7
ActionSA	4,862	4.66	0	5,009	4.81	3	3
Newcastle and District Residents Forum	3,981	3.81	2	3,579	3.43	1	3
Economic Freedom Fighters	2,904	2.78	0	2,650	2.54	2	2
International Revelation Congress	2,199	2.11	0	2,462	2.36	2	2
Amandla Awethu Movement	1,855	1.78	0	1,873	1.80	1	1
Freedom Front Plus	1,708	1.64	0	1,942	1.86	1	1
People's Voice Party	1,055	1.01	0	998	0.96	1	1
Independent Alliance	897	0.86	0	755	0.72	1	1
Majuba Progressive Movement	837	0.80	0	732	0.70	1	1
National Freedom Party	637	0.61	0	608	0.58	1	1
South African Communist Party	463	0.44	0	401	0.38	0	0
Afrika Mayibuye Movement	471	0.45	0	392	0.38	0	0
African Transformation Movement	403	0.39	0	428	0.41	0	0
Labour Party of South Africa	342	0.33	0	291	0.28	0	0
African United Party	327	0.31	0	258	0.25	0	0
Patriotic Alliance	521	0.50	0				0
Abantu Bezwelethu Congress Democracy	270	0.26	0	211	0.20	0	0
KZN Independence	242	0.23	0	146	0.14	0	0
Independent candidates	349	0.33	0				0
Sisonke Solidarity Movement	172	0.16	0	161	0.15	0	0
Community Freedom Party	176	0.17	0	136	0.13	0	0
Justice and Employment Party	190	0.18	0	122	0.12	0	0
Insika Yesizwe Party	102	0.10	0	171	0.16	0	0
Women and Youth Organisation	129	0.12	0	128	0.12	0	0
African Movement Congress	113	0.11	0	128	0.12	0	0
Al Jama-ah	106	0.10	0	112	0.11	0	0
African Economic Freedom	81	0.08	0	107	0.10	0	0
Active Citizens Coalition	99	0.09	0	82	0.08	0	0
African Restoration Movement	79	0.08	0	62	0.06	0	0
African Renaissance Unity	137	0.13	0				0
Service Delivery Party	71	0.07	0	45	0.04	0	0
Bumbana Mzansi	36	0.03	0	29	0.03	0	0
Total	104,353	100.00	36	104,243	100.00	35	71
Valid votes	104,353	98.36		104,243	98.61		
Invalid/blank votes	1,740	1.64		1,469	1.39		
Total votes	106,093	100.00		105,712	100.00		
Registered voters/turnout	201,526	52.64		201,526	52.46		
