= List of parties to the United Nations Framework Convention on Climate Change =

The United Nations Framework Convention on Climate Change (UNFCCC or FCCC) is an international environmental treaty negotiated at the United Nations Conference on Environment and Development (UNCED), informally known as the Earth Summit, held in Rio de Janeiro from 3 to 14 June 1992. The objective of the treaty is to "stabilize greenhouse gas concentrations in the atmosphere at a level that would prevent dangerous anthropogenic interference with the climate system".

The treaty itself set no binding limits on greenhouse gas emissions for individual countries and contains no enforcement mechanisms. In that sense, the treaty is considered legally non-binding. Instead, the treaty provides a framework for negotiating specific international treaties (called "protocols") that may set binding limits on greenhouse gases.

The UNFCCC was opened for signature on 9 May 1992, after an Intergovernmental Negotiating Committee produced the text of the Framework Convention as a report following its meeting in New York from 30 April to 9 May 1992. It entered into force on 21 March 1994. As of July 2022, UNFCCC has 198 parties.

== Parties ==
As of 2022, the UNFCCC has 198 parties including all United Nations member states, United Nations General Assembly observers the State of Palestine and the Holy See, UN non-member states Niue and the Cook Islands, and the supranational union European Union.

The United States notified the United Nations of its withdrawal from the treaty in February 2026, effective a year later, the first country to do so.

== Classification of parties by the annex ==
Parties to the UNFCCC Annex I and II parties Annex I parties Non-annex I parties

Parties to the UNFCCC are classified as:

- Annex I: There are 43 Parties to the UNFCCC listed in Annex I of the convention, including the European Union. These Parties are classified as industrialized (developed) countries and "economies in transition" (EITs). The 14 EITs are the former centrally-planned (Soviet) economies of Russia and Eastern Europe.
- Annex II: Of the Parties listed in Annex I of the convention, 24 are also listed in Annex II of the convention, including the European Union. These Parties are made up of members of the Organisation for Economic Co-operation and Development (OECD). Annex II Parties are required to provide financial and technical support to the EITs and developing countries to assist them in reducing their greenhouse gas emissions (climate change mitigation) and manage the impacts of climate change (climate change adaptation).
- Non-Annex I: Parties to the UNFCCC not listed in Annex I of the convention are mostly low-income developing countries. Developing countries may volunteer to become Annex I countries when they are sufficiently developed.
- Least-developed countries (LDCs): 49 Parties are LDCs, and are given special status under the treaty in view of their limited capacity to adapt to the effects of climate change.

== Party negotiation groups ==
Like minded parties group themselves in negotiation blocks, who often take common positions. Twelve parties do not belong to any block.

- G77 & China
- AOSIS (Alliance of Small Island States, often referred to as the SIDS, Small Island Developing States)
- AGN (African Group of Negotiators)
- LDCs (Least Developed Countries)

- AILAC (Independent Alliance of Latin America and the Caribbean)
- LMDCs (Like-Minded Developing Countries)
- Arab Group

- EIG (Environmental Integrity Group)
- Umbrella Group
- EU (European Union)

Parties of the UNFCCC and the most common party negotiation groups

=== Historical evolution ===
Some of the groups are more of a geographic nature, such as the AGN, Arab Group, or AOSIS. THe EU is of highly political nature. Membership in the LDCs is defined by economic and other indicators. AILAC, LMDCs, Grupo Sur change often, while EIG and Umbrella group change little over the years before 2025.

The JUSSCANZ (Japan, the US, Switzerland, Canada, Australia, Norway and New Zealand), or JUSCANZ, which is a coalition of like-minded countries at various United Nations bodies, such as the UNHRC, or the UNCTAD. With sometimes also Iceland, Mexico, the Republic of Korea being invited. The Umbrella and the EIG Groups emerged as a variations of the JUSSCANZ coalition following the adoption of the Kyoto Protocol.

Other groups that existet have been:

- Cartagena Dialogue (for Progressive Action), a group of around 40 countries working towards a comprehensive and legally binding climate agreement under the UNFCCC, committed to becoming or remaining low-carbon economies. It existed after COP15.
- CACAM (Central Asia, Caucasus, Albania and Moldova),
- the Coalition for Rainforest Nations, and
- the Mountain Partnership Group (formerly the Group of Mountainous Landlocked Counties).

== List of parties ==
State	Classification	Signature	Ratification	Notes
Afghanistan		June 12, 1992	September 19, 2002	
Albania			October 3, 1994	
Algeria		June 13, 1992	June 9, 1993	
Andorra			March 2, 2011	
Angola		June 14, 1992	May 17, 2000	
Antigua and Barbuda		June 4, 1992	February 2, 1993	
Argentina		June 12, 1992	March 11, 1994	
Armenia		June 13, 1992	May 14, 1993	
Australia	Annex I, II	June 4, 1992	December 30, 1992	
Austria	Annex I, II	June 8, 1992	February 28, 1994	
Azerbaijan		June 12, 1992	May 16, 1995	
Bahamas		June 12, 1992	March 29, 1994	
Bahrain		June 8, 1992	December 28, 1994	
Bangladesh		June 9, 1992	April 15, 1994	
Barbados		June 12, 1992	March 23, 1994	
Belarus	Annex I, EIT	June 11, 1992	May 11, 2000	
Belgium	Annex I, II	June 4, 1992	January 16, 1996	
Belize		June 13, 1992	October 31, 1994	
Benin		June 13, 1992	June 30, 1994	
Bhutan		June 11, 1992	August 25, 1995	
Bolivia		June 10, 1992	October 3, 1994	
Bosnia and Herzegovina			September 7, 2000	
Botswana		June 12, 1992	January 27, 1994	
Brazil		June 4, 1992	February 28, 1994	
Brunei			August 7, 2007	
Bulgaria	Annex I, EIT	June 5, 1992	May 12, 1995	
Burkina Faso		June 12, 1992	September 2, 1993	
Burundi		June 11, 1992	January 6, 1997	
Cambodia			December 18, 1995	
Cameroon		June 14, 1992	October 19, 1994	
Canada	Annex I, II	June 12, 1992	December 4, 1992	
Cape Verde		June 12, 1992	March 29, 1995	
Central African Republic		June 13, 1992	March 10, 1995	
Chad		June 12, 1992	June 7, 1994	
Chile		June 13, 1992	December 22, 1994	
China		June 11, 1992	January 5, 1993	Applies to Macao, extended by Portugal on 28 June 1999. Application remained in force after transfer of sovereignty to China. Applies to Hong Kong from 8 April 2003.
Colombia		June 13, 1992	March 22, 1995	
Comoros		June 11, 1992	October 31, 1994	
Democratic Republic of the Congo		June 11, 1992	January 9, 1995	
Republic of the Congo		June 12, 1992	October 14, 1996	
Cook Islands		June 12, 1992	April 20, 1993	
Costa Rica		June 13, 1992	August 26, 1994	
Côte d'Ivoire		June 10, 1992	November 29, 1994	
Croatia	Annex I, EIT	June 11, 1992	April 8, 1996	At its request, added to Annex I as an EIT by an amendment which entered into force in 1998.
Cuba		June 13, 1992	January 5, 1994	
Cyprus	Annex I	June 12, 1992	October 15, 1997	At its request, added to Annex I by an amendment which entered into force in 2013.
Czechia	Annex I, EIT (Note: Monaco (1992), the Czech Republic (1995), Slovakia (1996), Slovenia (1998) and Kazakhstan (2000) submitted declarations under Article 4.2 (g) of the UNFCCC. All of these states except Kazakhstan have since been added to Annex I of the UNFCCC by an amendment to the convention.)	June 18, 1993	October 7, 1993	At its request, replaced Czechoslovakia in Annex I as an EIT by an amendment which entered into force in 1998.
Denmark	Annex I, II	June 9, 1992	December 21, 1993	Including Faroe Islands and Greenland
Djibouti		June 12, 1992	August 27, 1995	
Dominica			June 21, 1993	
Dominican Republic		June 12, 1992	October 7, 1998	
Ecuador		June 9, 1992	February 23, 1993	
Egypt		June 9, 1992	December 5, 1994	
El Salvador		June 13, 1992	December 4, 1995	
Equatorial Guinea			August 16, 2000	
Eritrea			April 24, 1995	
Estonia	Annex I, EIT	June 12, 1992	July 27, 1994	
Eswatini		June 12, 1992	October 7, 1996	
Ethiopia		June 10, 1992	April 5, 1994	
European Union (Note: All 27 EU member states are also members of the UNFCCC individually, in addition to their common representation through the EU.)	Annex I, II	June 13, 1992	December 21, 1993	Ratified as the European Economic Community.
Fiji		October 9, 1992	February 25, 1993	
Finland	Annex I, II	June 4, 1992	May 3, 1994	
France	Annex I, II	June 13, 1992	March 25, 1994	
Gabon		June 12, 1992	January 21, 1998	
Gambia		June 12, 1992	June 10, 1994	
Georgia			July 29, 1994	
Germany	Annex I, II	June 12, 1992	December 9, 1993	
Ghana		June 12, 1992	September 6, 1995	
Greece	Annex I, II	June 12, 1992	August 4, 1994	
Grenada		December 3, 1992	August 11, 1994	
Guatemala		June 13, 1992	December 15, 1995	
Guinea		June 12, 1992	May 7, 1993	
Guinea-Bissau		June 12, 1992	October 27, 1995	
Guyana		June 13, 1992	August 29, 1994	
Haiti		June 13, 1992	September 25, 1996	
Holy See			July 6, 2022	
Honduras		June 13, 1992	October 19, 1995	
Hungary	Annex I, EIT	June 13, 1992	February 24, 1994	
Iceland	Annex I, II	June 4, 1992	June 16, 1993	
India		June 10, 1992	November 1, 1993	
Indonesia		June 5, 1992	August 23, 1994	
Iran		June 14, 1992	July 18, 1996	
Iraq			July 28, 2009	
Ireland	Annex I, II	June 13, 1992	April 20, 1994	
Israel		June 4, 1992	June 4, 1996	
Italy	Annex I, II	June 5, 1992	April 15, 1994	
Jamaica		June 12, 1992	January 6, 1995	
Japan	Annex I, II	June 13, 1992	May 28, 1993	
Jordan		June 11, 1992	November 12, 1993	
Kazakhstan	(Note: Kazakhstan proposed in 1999 that Annex I be amended to include it, but the proposal was never adopted by the Conference of the Parties to the UNFCCC as no consensus could be reached on the matter.)	June 8, 1992	May 17, 1995	
Kenya		June 12, 1992	August 30, 1994	
Kiribati		June 13, 1992	February 7, 1995	
North Korea		June 11, 1992	December 5, 1994	
South Korea		June 13, 1992	December 14, 1993	
Kuwait			December 28, 1994	
Kyrgyzstan			May 25, 2000	
Laos			January 4, 1995	
Latvia	Annex I, EIT	June 11, 1992	March 23, 1995	
Lebanon		June 12, 1992	December 15, 1994	
Lesotho		June 11, 1992	February 7, 1995	
Liberia		June 12, 1992	November 5, 2002	
Libya		June 29, 1992	June 14, 1999	
Liechtenstein	Annex I	June 4, 1992	June 22, 1994	At its request, added to Annex I by an amendment which entered into force in 1998.
Lithuania	Annex I, EIT	June 11, 1992	March 24, 1995	
Luxembourg	Annex I, II	June 9, 1992	May 9, 1994	
North Macedonia			January 28, 1998	
Madagascar		June 10, 1992	June 2, 1999	
Malawi		June 10, 1992	April 21, 1994	
Malaysia		June 9, 1993	July 13, 1994	
Maldives		June 12, 1992	November 9, 1992	
Mali		September 30, 1992	December 28, 1994	
Malta	Annex I	June 12, 1992	March 17, 1994	At its request, added to Annex I by an amendment which entered into force in 2010.
Marshall Islands		June 12, 1992	October 8, 1992	
Mauritania		June 12, 1992	January 20, 1994	
Mauritius		June 10, 1992	September 4, 1992	
Mexico		June 13, 1992	March 11, 1993	
Micronesia		June 12, 1992	November 18, 1993	
Moldova		June 12, 1992	June 9, 1995	
Monaco	Annex I	June 11, 1992	November 20, 1992	At its request, added to Annex I by an amendment which entered into force in 1998.
Mongolia		June 12, 1992	September 30, 1993	
Montenegro			October 23, 2006	
Morocco		June 13, 1992	December 28, 1995	
Mozambique		June 12, 1992	August 25, 1995	
Myanmar		June 11, 1992	November 25, 1994	
Namibia		June 12, 1992	May 16, 1995	
Nauru		June 8, 1992	November 11, 1993	
Nepal		June 12, 1992	May 2, 1994	
Netherlands	Annex I, II	June 4, 1992	December 20, 1993	Excluding Aruba, Curaçao, Caribbean Netherlands and Sint Maarten
New Zealand	Annex I, II	June 4, 1992	September 16, 1993	
Nicaragua		June 13, 1992	October 31, 1995	
Niger		June 11, 1992	July 25, 1995	
Nigeria		June 13, 1992	August 29, 1994	
Niue			February 28, 1996	
Norway	Annex I, II	June 4, 1992	July 9, 1993	
Oman		June 11, 1992	February 8, 1995	
Pakistan		June 13, 1992	June 1, 1994	
Palau			December 10, 1999	
Palestine			December 18, 2015	
Panama		March 18, 1993	May 23, 1995	
Papua New Guinea		June 13, 1992	March 16, 1993	
Paraguay		June 12, 1992	February 24, 1994	
Peru		June 12, 1992	June 7, 1993	
Philippines		June 12, 1992	August 2, 1994	
Poland	Annex I, EIT	June 5, 1992	July 28, 1994	
Portugal	Annex I, II	June 13, 1992	December 21, 1993	
Qatar			April 18, 1996	
Romania	Annex I, EIT	June 5, 1992	June 8, 1994	
Russia	Annex I, EIT	June 13, 1992	December 28, 1994	
Rwanda		June 10, 1992	August 18, 1998	
Saint Kitts and Nevis		June 12, 1992	January 7, 1993	
Saint Lucia		June 14, 1993	June 14, 1993	
Saint Vincent and the Grenadines			December 2, 1996	
Samoa		June 12, 1992	November 29, 1994	
San Marino		June 10, 1992	October 28, 1994	
São Tomé and Príncipe		June 12, 1992	September 29, 1999	
Saudi Arabia			December 28, 1994	
Senegal		June 13, 1992	October 17, 1994	
Serbia			March 12, 2001	Acceded as the Federal Republic of Yugoslavia in 2001. The FR Yugoslavia had previously signed (8 June 1992) and ratified (3 September 1997) the UNFCCC, but this was not recognized by the Secretary-General of the United Nations as depositary because UN membership or membership of a UN specialized agency is a prerequisite to become party to the convention, and the succession of the FR Yugoslavia from the Socialist Federal Republic of Yugoslavia (and its UN membership) was disputed.
Seychelles		June 10, 1992	September 22, 1992	
Sierra Leone		February 11, 1993	June 22, 1995	
Singapore		June 13, 1992	May 29, 1997	
Slovakia	Annex I, EIT	May 19, 1993	August 25, 1994	At its request, replaced Czechoslovakia in Annex I as an EIT by an amendment which entered into force in 1998.
Slovenia	Annex I, EIT	June 13, 1992	December 1, 1995	At its request, added to Annex I as an EIT by an amendment which entered into force in 1998.
Solomon Islands		June 13, 1992	December 28, 1994	
Somalia			September 11, 2009	
South Africa		June 15, 1993	August 29, 1997	
South Sudan			February 17, 2014	
Spain	Annex I, II	June 13, 1992	December 21, 1993	
Sri Lanka		June 10, 1992	November 23, 1993	
Sudan		June 9, 1992	November 19, 1993	
Suriname		June 13, 1992	October 14, 1997	
Sweden	Annex I, II	June 8, 1992	June 23, 1993	
Switzerland	Annex I, II	June 12, 1992	December 10, 1993	
Syria			January 4, 1996	
Tajikistan			January 7, 1998	
Tanzania		June 12, 1992	April 17, 1996	
Thailand		June 12, 1992	December 28, 1994	
Timor-Leste			October 10, 2006	
Togo		June 12, 1992	March 8, 1995	
Tonga			July 20, 1998	
Trinidad and Tobago		June 11, 1992	June 24, 1994	
Tunisia		June 13, 1992	July 15, 1993	
Turkiye	Annex I		February 24, 2004	Turkey was originally listed in both Annex I and Annex II of the UNFCCC. It refused to ratify the convention, as it objected to its listing in the annexes. In 1997 a proposal was submitted that Annex I and Annex II be amended to remove Turkey. Though no consensus could be reached on this proposal, a compromise was reached and an amendment that entered into force in 2002 removed Turkey from Annex II.
Turkmenistan			June 5, 1995	
Tuvalu		June 8, 1992	October 26, 1993	
Uganda		June 13, 1992	September 8, 1993	
Ukraine	Annex I, EIT	June 11, 1992	May 13, 1997	
United Arab Emirates			December 29, 1995	
United Kingdom	Annex I, II	June 12, 1992	December 8, 1993	Including Jersey, Isle of Man, Guernsey (8 December 1993), Gibraltar (2 January 2007), Bermuda, Cayman Islands and Falkland Islands (7 March 2007). Anguilla, British Virgin Islands, Montserrat, Pitcairn Islands, Saint Helena, Ascension and Tristan da Cunha, Turks and Caicos Islands or the Sovereign Base Areas of Akrotiri and Dhekelia: not applied
United States	Annex I, II	June 12, 1992	October 15, 1992	The United States notified the United Nations of its withdrawal from the treaty on 27 February 2026, which will be effective 1 year later.
Uruguay		June 4, 1992	August 18, 1994	
Uzbekistan			June 20, 1993	
Vanuatu		June 9, 1992	March 25, 1993	
Venezuela		June 12, 1992	December 28, 1994	
Vietnam		June 11, 1992	November 16, 1994	
Yemen		June 12, 1992	February 21, 1996	
Zambia		June 11, 1992	May 28, 1993	
Zimbabwe		June 12, 1992	November 3, 1992	
