= EMadlangeni Local Municipality elections =

Local elections in KwaZulu-Natal, South Africa

The eMadlangeni Local Municipality (previously known as Utrecht Local Municipality) council consists of eleven members elected by mixed-member proportional representation. Six councillors are elected by first-past-the-post voting in six wards, while the remaining five are chosen from party lists so that the total number of party representatives is proportional to the number of votes received.

In the election of 3 August 2016 the African National Congress (ANC) won a majority of six seats on the council. In the election of 1 November 2021 the ANC lost its majority, with both the ANC and Inkatha Freedom Party (IFP) winning four seats on the council.

In the election of 4 November 2026 the IFP retained its four seats to finish as the largest party on the council.

== Results ==
The following table shows the composition of the council after past elections.

Event	ANC	DA	EFF	IFP	NFP	MKP	Other	Total
2000 election	1	1	—	5	—	—	0	7
2006 election	3	1	—	3	—	—	0	7
2011 election	3	1	—	2	1	—	0	7
2016 election	6	1	1	3	—	—	0	11
2021 election	4	1	1	4	1	—	0	11
2026 election	3	1	0	4	0	3	0	11

== December 2000 election ==
The following table shows the results of the 2000 election.

Party	Ward			List			Total seats
Party	Votes	%	Seats	Votes	%	Seats	Total seats
Inkatha Freedom Party	2,635	64.08	4	2,475	59.84	1	5
African National Congress	644	15.66	0	768	18.57	1	1
Democratic Alliance	611	14.86	0	760	18.38	1	1
Vukani Utrecht Ratepayers Association	222	5.40	0	133	3.22	0	0
Total	4,112	100.00	4	4,136	100.00	3	7
Valid votes	4,112	96.80		4,136	97.25		
Invalid/blank votes	136	3.20		117	2.75		
Total votes	4,248	100.00		4,253	100.00		
Registered voters/turnout	11,093	38.29		11,093	38.34		

== March 2006 election ==
The following table shows the results of the 2006 election.

Party	Ward			List			Total seats
Party	Votes	%	Seats	Votes	%	Seats	Total seats
Inkatha Freedom Party	2,340	47.15	3	2,289	45.90	0	3
African National Congress	1,796	36.19	1	1,844	36.98	2	3
Democratic Alliance	394	7.94	0	406	8.14	1	1
Freedom Front Plus	187	3.77	0	201	4.03	0	0
National Democratic Convention	144	2.90	0	164	3.29	0	0
African Christian Democratic Party	102	2.06	0	83	1.66	0	0
Total	4,963	100.00	4	4,987	100.00	3	7
Valid votes	4,963	97.54		4,987	97.19		
Invalid/blank votes	125	2.46		144	2.81		
Total votes	5,088	100.00		5,131	100.00		
Registered voters/turnout	10,880	46.76		10,880	47.16		

== May 2011 election ==
The following table shows the results of the 2011 election.

Party	Ward			List			Total seats
Party	Votes	%	Seats	Votes	%	Seats	Total seats
African National Congress	2,815	40.50	4	2,860	41.12	−1	3
Inkatha Freedom Party	1,685	24.24	0	1,662	23.90	2	2
National Freedom Party	1,239	17.83	0	1,233	17.73	1	1
Democratic Alliance	599	8.62	0	608	8.74	1	1
Azanian People's Organisation	285	4.10	0	300	4.31	0	0
Freedom Front Plus	120	1.73	0	99	1.42	0	0
Royal Loyal Progress	70	1.01	0	65	0.93	0	0
African Christian Democratic Party	74	1.06	0	58	0.83	0	0
Congress of the People	49	0.71	0	43	0.62	0	0
Great Kongress of South Africa	14	0.20	0	27	0.39	0	0
Total	6,950	100.00	4	6,955	100.00	3	7
Valid votes	6,950	97.65		6,955	97.67		
Invalid/blank votes	167	2.35		166	2.33		
Total votes	7,117	100.00		7,121	100.00		
Registered voters/turnout	11,587	61.42		11,587	61.46		

== August 2016 election ==
The following table shows the results of the 2016 election.

Party	Ward			List			Total seats
Party	Votes	%	Seats	Votes	%	Seats	Total seats
African National Congress	4,788	53.54	6	5,167	58.01	0	6
Inkatha Freedom Party	1,977	22.11	0	1,986	22.30	3	3
Democratic Alliance	759	8.49	0	789	8.86	1	1
Economic Freedom Fighters	588	6.57	0	608	6.83	1	1
Independent candidates	537	6.00	0				0
Freedom Front Plus	119	1.33	0	124	1.39	0	0
Azanian People's Organisation	92	1.03	0	117	1.31	0	0
Royal Loyal Progress	83	0.93	0	116	1.30	0	0
Total	8,943	100.00	6	8,907	100.00	5	11
Valid votes	8,943	97.57		8,907	97.20		
Invalid/blank votes	223	2.43		257	2.80		
Total votes	9,166	100.00		9,164	100.00		
Registered voters/turnout	14,331	63.96		14,331	63.95		

== November 2021 election ==
The following table shows the results of the 2021 election.

Party	Ward			List			Total seats
Party	Votes	%	Seats	Votes	%	Seats	Total seats
Inkatha Freedom Party	2,601	32.94	3	2,930	37.06	1	4
African National Congress	2,269	28.74	2	2,320	29.34	2	4
Democratic Alliance	773	9.79	1	879	11.12	0	1
Economic Freedom Fighters	729	9.23	0	800	10.12	1	1
National Freedom Party	377	4.77	0	353	4.46	1	1
Independent candidates	585	7.41	0				0
Patriotic Alliance	181	2.29	0	166	2.10	0	0
African Transformation Movement	113	1.43	0	95	1.20	0	0
Team Sugar South Africa	70	0.89	0	101	1.28	0	0
KZN Independence	29	0.37	0	98	1.24	0	0
Abantu Batho Congress	39	0.49	0	40	0.51	0	0
Royal Loyal Progress	37	0.47	0	40	0.51	0	0
African People's Movement	39	0.49	0	33	0.42	0	0
African Mantungwa Community	31	0.39	0	23	0.29	0	0
African Freedom Revolution	23	0.29	0	29	0.37	0	0
Total	7,896	100.00	6	7,907	100.00	5	11
Valid votes	7,896	97.04		7,907	97.09		
Invalid/blank votes	241	2.96		237	2.91		
Total votes	8,137	100.00		8,144	100.00		
Registered voters/turnout	15,019	54.18		15,019	54.22		

== November 2026 election ==
The following table shows the results of the 2026 election.

Party	Ward			List			Total seats
Party	Votes	%	Seats	Votes	%	Seats	Total seats
Inkatha Freedom Party	2,909	29.59	4	2,796	28.43	0	4
uMkhonto weSizwe Party	2,754	28.01	1	2,854	29.02	2	3
African National Congress	2,411	24.52	0	2,343	23.83	3	3
Democratic Alliance	969	9.86	1	993	10.10	0	1
National Freedom Party	263	2.67	0	254	2.58	0	0
Economic Freedom Fighters	136	1.38	0	192	1.95	0	0
Majuba Progressive Movement	71	0.72	0	90	0.92	0	0
Newcastle and District Residents Forum	76	0.77	0	62	0.63	0	0
Amandla Awethu Movement	57	0.58	0	48	0.49	0	0
International Revelation Congress	49	0.50	0	51	0.52	0	0
African Transformation Movement	38	0.39	0	57	0.58	0	0
Afrika Mayibuye Movement	34	0.35	0	42	0.43	0	0
Insika Yesizwe Party	38	0.39	0	24	0.24	0	0
South African Communist Party	13	0.13	0	16	0.16	0	0
People's Voice Party	14	0.14	0	11	0.11	0	0
Total	9,832	100.00	6	9,833	100.00	5	11
Valid votes	9,832	98.26		9,833	98.29		
Invalid/blank votes	174	1.74		171	1.71		
Total votes	10,006	100.00		10,004	100.00		
Registered voters/turnout	17,694	56.55		17,694	56.54		
