= Margaret Rajbally =

South African politician and trade unionist

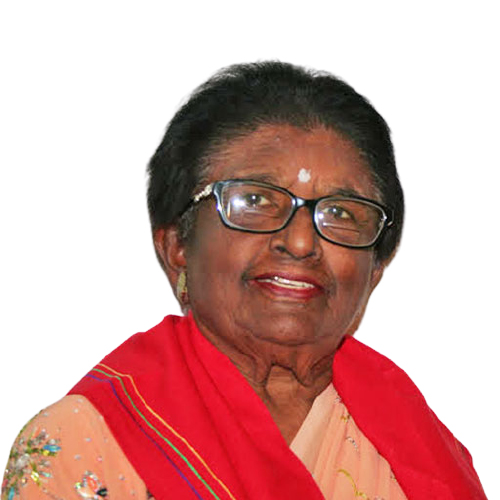

Member of the National Assembly
- In office June 1999 – May 2009
- Constituency: KwaZulu-Natal

Personal details
- Born: 25 February 1932 (age 94)
- Citizenship: South Africa
- Party: Minority Front

Sunklavathy "Margaret" Rajbally (born 25 February 1932) is a retired South African politician and former trade unionist from KwaZulu-Natal. A garment worker by occupation, she was an organiser for the Garment Workers' Industrial Union in Durban during apartheid. She became a founding member of the Minority Front (MF) in 1993 and represented the party in the National Assembly for two terms from 1999 to 2009.

== Early life and union career ==
Rajbally was born on 25 February 1932. Later classified as Indian under apartheid, she was the youngest of nine children; her father was a taxi driver. Though raised in Edendale outside Pietermaritzburg, she left home as a teenager to complete her schooling at Sastri College in Durban. From the age of 15, she funded her education by working part-time as a machinist at Ascot Clothing in Umbilo.

Shortly after becoming a full-time machinist, she was promoted to become a supervisor and was also elected as a shop steward. She was the steward at her workplace for the next two decades. In 1953, she took up a position as an organiser at the Garment Workers' Industrial Union. She worked for the union until 1993, when she retired from organising.

== Political career ==
By the time of her retirement from union organising, Rajbally had struck up a friendship with Amichand Rajbansi, who was then a member of the House of Delegates; they had met at a public meeting in Durban in the early 1990s and she had agreed to help him prepare to form a political party, particularly by introducing him to labour audiences. She was a founding member of Rajbansi's Minority Front (MF) in 1993.

From 1996 to 1999, Rajbally represented the MF as a ward councillor and deputy mayor in Durban's eThekwini Municipality. She left the council after the 1999 general election, in which the MF gained a single seat in the National Assembly; Rajbally persuaded Rajbansi to allow her to occupy it. She served two terms in the seat, gaining re-election in 2004; from 2004, she was joined by a second MF representative, Royith Bhoola.

Rajbally left Parliament after the 2009 general election. She remained active in the MF, and she stood unsuccessfully as a candidate for the party in the 2014 general election.

== Retirement and personal life ==
Rajbally had retired from frontline politics by 2017, though she remained connected to the MF. When the party was relaunched in 2018, she was elected to its national executive committee. She is also an area coordinator in her neighbourhood of Chatsworth. She has children and grandchildren.
