= Shameen Thakur-Rajbansi =

South African politician (born 1964)

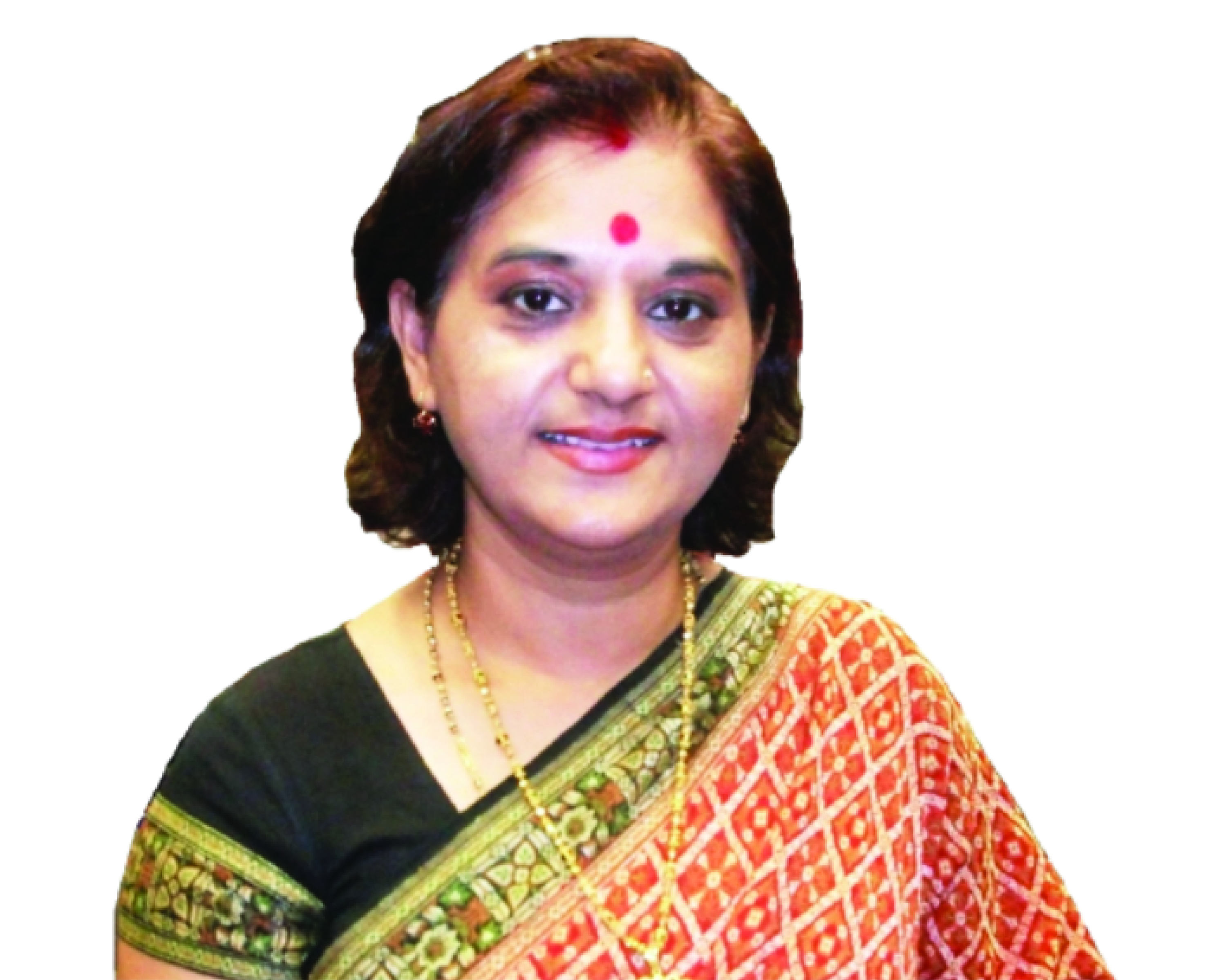

Personal details
- Born: Shameen Thakur; 17 November 1964 (age 61) Durban, Natal; South Africa
- Party: Minority Front
- Spouse: Amichand Rajbansi (m. 2001; died 2011)
- Education: University of Durban-Westville; University of KwaZulu-Natal

Shameen Thakur-Rajbansi (née Thakur; born 17 November 1964) is a South African politician who has been the leader of the Minority Front since 2012. She has represented the party in the KwaZulu-Natal Legislature since 1999 until 2004.

After two decades of practice as a pharmacist in Phoenix, Thakur-Rajbansi entered politics when she joined the Minority Front in 1998. In January 2012, she became leader of the party, succeeding her late husband, Amichand Rajbansi. Over the next two years, her position in the party was uncertain due to internal disputes with Rajbansi's family and Minority Front politician Roy Bhoola; those disputes were largely settled in December 2013, when all parties affirmed Thakur-Rajbansi's leadership.

== Early life and career ==
Thakur-Rajbansi was born on 17 November 1964 in Durban in the former Natal Province. Her parents were Devjeith Thakur, a teacher, and Betty Thakur, a housewife. Her paternal grandfather was an indentured mineworker of Indian origin. She was raised and educated in Newcastle in northwest Natal; an avid competitive debater, she was also head girl at St Oswald's High School in 1982, the year she matriculated.

Thakur-Rajbansi's father referred to his six daughters as his "sons" and encouraged them to pursue further education. Although Thakur-Rajbansi, the eldest daughter, wanted to become a lawyer, he encouraged her to pursue medicine. After he died in a shooting during her matric year, she enrolled at the University of Durban-Westville to study science. She graduated in 1987 with a Bachelor of Pharmacy and moved to Ladysmith to complete her pharmaceutical traineeship at Ladysmith Provincial Hospital.

In 1990, Thakur-Rajbansi opened a retail pharmacy, Eastbury Pharmacy, in Easterly in Phoenix, a majority-Indian settlement outside Durban. She practiced as a pharmacist for two decades, including during her early political career, until she sold the pharmacy in 2010 to pursue politics full-time. Also in 2010, she completed a Master of Business Administration at the University of KwaZulu-Natal.

== Political career ==
=== Ordinary Member of the Legislature: 1999–2012 ===
Thakur-Rajbansi joined the Minority Front (MF) in 1998 after expressing an interest in politics to Amichand Rajbansi, the party's founder, who later became her husband. She was elected as chairperson of the MF Women's League. The following year, in the 1999 general election, she was elected to represent the MF in the KwaZulu-Natal Legislature; she and Rajbansi held the party's two seats in the legislature. After 1999, she secured re-election in four consecutive elections, most recently as the sole MF representative elected in the 2019 general election.

=== Leader of the Minority Front: 2012–present ===
==== Leadership dispute: 2012–2013 ====
Thakur-Rajbansi was appointed as interim leader of the MF in 2011 when Rajbansi fell ill. Shortly after his death, on 19 January 2012, the MF announced that its leadership had appointed Thakur-Rajbansi to succeed her husband as party president. She said that she would seek to continue Rajbansi's legacy, particularly by maintaining the party's staunch support for the protection of minority rights. Her stepson, Vimal Rajbansi, welcomed her appointment and said that the rest of Rajbansi's family would not be directly involved in the governance of the party. However, later in 2012, he launched a campaign to oust Thakur-Rajbansi from the party presidency, telling the press that she had "become an autocrat and a law onto herself". He said that he and his mother, Amichand Rajbansi's first wife Asha Devi, would avail themselves "to step in and save the party".

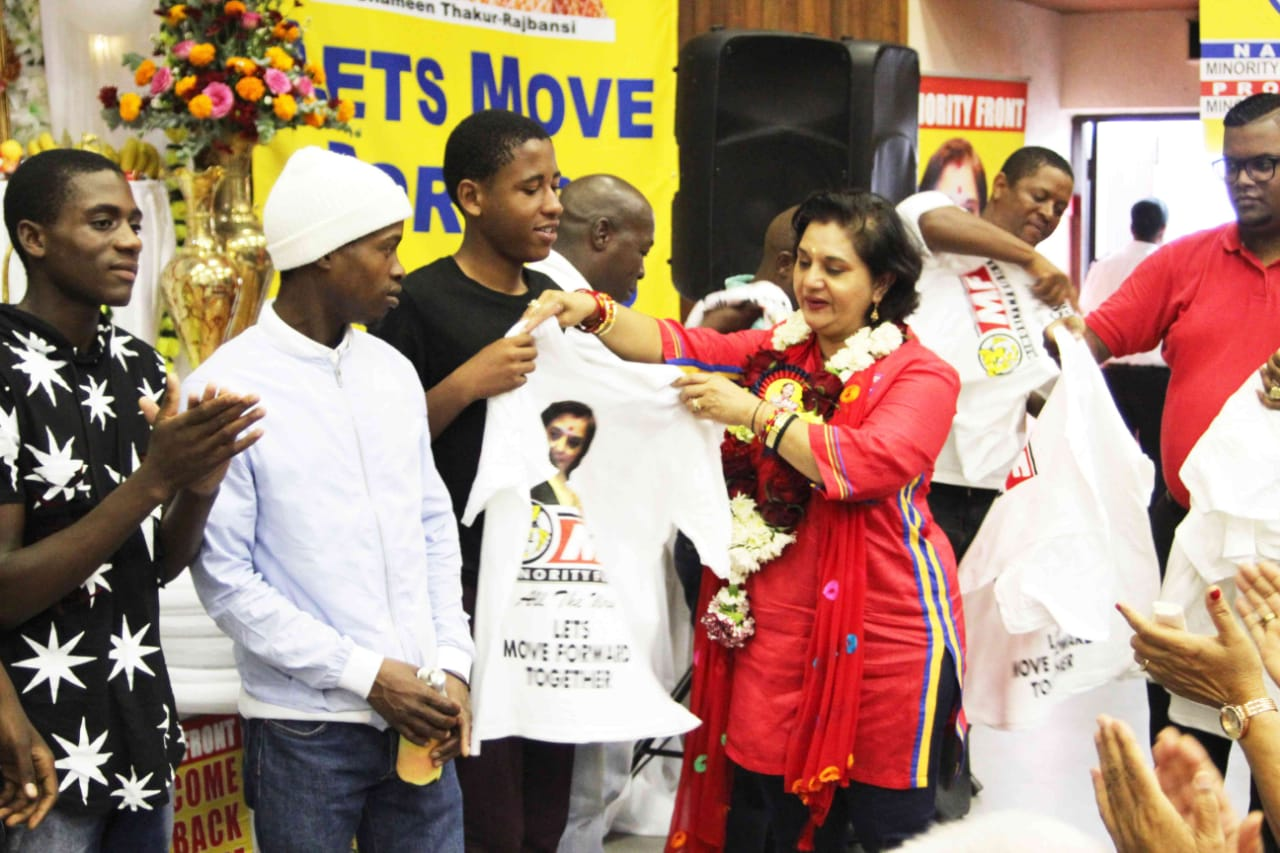
Thakur-Rajbansi with MF supporters at the party's 2019 election manifesto launch in Chatsworth

Among the matters of contention was an attempt by Thakur-Rajbansi to remove Roy Bhoola from his position as the MF's sole representative in the National Assembly; the move was later reversed by court order. In November 2012, some MF leaders and supporters held what was ostensibly a party elective conference in Shallcross, at which Bhoola was elected to replace Thakur-Rajbansi as party president. Thakur-Rajbansi did not attend the conference and denied that it was a legitimate election. A prolonged court battle followed in the Durban High Court. The dispute was not settled until December 2013, when the disputants announced that they had reached an out-of-court settlement, in terms of which all parties agreed to affirm Thakur-Rajbansi's presidency.

==== Electoral decline: 2014–present ====
By the time of the 2016 local elections, the Business Day observed that the MF had "disintegrated under the leadership" of Thakur-Rajbansi, particularly due to fragmentation caused by internal disputes. The party lost its parliamentary representation in the 2014 general election, retaining only Thakur-Rajbansi's seat in the KwaZulu-Natal Legislature.

== Personal life ==
Thakur-Rajbansi was formerly married to a school teacher, who died in 1993. Their first child died as an infant. Their second, a son born in 1991 and named Pradhil, had Addison's disease. Pradhil, a MF politician and researcher, died in a road accident with his fiancée in KwaZulu-Natal in November 2022.

Thakur-Rajbansi remarried to Amichand Rajbansi on 30 March 2001 in Durban at a traditional Hindu ceremony that included speeches by politicians Faith Gasa and Margaret Rajbally. She thus became stepmother to Rajbansi's four children from his first marriage. Rajbansi died on 29 December 2011 after a stay in hospital for bronchitis. In addition to the family dispute over control of the MF, his death precipitated conflict over the execution his will. Although Thakur-Rajbansi was appointed as executor, her appointment was challenged in court by two of her stepdaughters; Rajbansi had written four wills between 2000 and 2010, and the most recent two versions excluded Thakur-Rajbansi from the executor position and from her trusteeship at the Amichand Rajbansi Family Trust.
