= EIG =

Eig or EIG may refer to:

== People ==
- Alexander Eig (1894–1938), Israeli botanist
- Jonathan Eig (born 1964), American journalist and author
- Sam Eig (c. 1899–1982), American real estate developer and philanthropist

== Places ==
- Eigg, an island of Scotland
- Eik, Vest-Agder, Norway

== Other uses ==
- Economic Interest Group, a type of French company
- Edmonton Investors Group, a Canadian sports management company
- Ei Group, a British pub group
- EIG Global Energy Partners, an American energy investment firm
- Electromagnetically induced grating
- Endurance International Group, an American web hosting company
- Environmental Integrity Group, a group of six parties to the United Nations Framework Convention on Climate Change
- Europe India Gateway, a submarine telecommunications cable system
