= Shameen =

Shameen may refer to:

== Given name ==
- Shameen Khan (born 1995), a Pakistani actress
- Shameen Thakur-Rajbansi (born 1964)), a South African politician

== Geography and history of China ==
- Shamian Island in Guangzhou, China, also known as Shameen or Shamin
  - Shameen Incident, which occurred on June 23, 1925

== Other uses ==
- Shameen, a character in the Quest for Glory series of adventure games
- In Kurdish, it refers to a wild flower that grow in mountains.
