= Umbrella Group =

Party groupings. Umbrella Group on the right in orange.

The Umbrella group is an informal coalition that likes to take a common position during climate negotiations. It consists of several parties to the UNFCCC. The group formed during the climate negotiations of the early 1990s, initially containing just fully industrialised (Annex I & II) nations that were not part of the EU. The founding members were Japan, the United States, Canada, Australia, Norway and New Zealand. The group was initially known as either JUSCANZ or JUSCANNZ. Later several countries joined that were members of Annex 1 but not Annex 2, and which were also members of the CIS. The first two CIS nations to join were Russia and Ukraine.

The term "Umbrella group" became widely used after 1997. The name arose due to the membership seeing themselves as needing an "umbrella" to protect from positions taken by the EU. In the early to mid 1990s, when China was less influential, the EU was an especially powerful actor in climate negotiations, as it could to a degree marshal support from the larger G77 group.

Following the 2022 invasion, Russia and Belarus were ejected from the group.

== Members ==
=== CIS & Annex I ===
- Kazakhstan
- Ukraine

==== Former CIS & Annex I ====
- Belarus - until 2022
- Russia - until 2022

=== Annex I & II ===
- Australia
- Canada
- Iceland
- Japan
- New Zealand
- Norway
- United Kingdom
- United States

=== Independent ===
- Israel
