= Okhahlamba Local Municipality elections =

Local elections in KwaZulu-Natal, South Africa

The Okhahlamba Local Municipality council consists of twenty-nine members elected by mixed-member proportional representation. Fifteen councillors are elected by first-past-the-post voting in fifteen wards, while the remaining fourteen are chosen from party lists so that the total number of party representatives is proportional to the number of votes received.

In the election of 4 November 2026 no party won a majority on the council. The Inkatha Freedom Party (IFP) and uMkhonto weSizwe Party both obtained eight seats.

== Results ==
The following table shows the composition of the council after past elections.

Event	ANC	APM	DA	EFF	IFP	NFP	MKP	Other	Total
2000 election	5	—	2	—	18	—	—	1	26
2006 election	9	—	1	—	16	—	—	0	26
2011 election	13	—	1	—	8	6	—	0	28
2016 election	15	—	2	1	7	—	—	4	29
2021 election	8	6	1	2	9	2	—	1	29
2026 election	5	2	2	1	8	0	8	3	29

== December 2000 election ==
The following table shows the results of the 2000 election.

Party	Ward			List			Total seats
Party	Votes	%	Seats	Votes	%	Seats	Total seats
Inkatha Freedom Party	15,813	69.39	13	16,029	70.39	5	18
African National Congress	4,624	20.29	0	4,504	19.78	5	5
Democratic Alliance	1,182	5.19	0	1,244	5.46	2	2
African Christian Democratic Party	1,168	5.13	0	996	4.37	1	1
Total	22,787	100.00	13	22,773	100.00	13	26
Valid votes	22,787	97.21		22,773	97.01		
Invalid/blank votes	655	2.79		701	2.99		
Total votes	23,442	100.00		23,474	100.00		
Registered voters/turnout	44,951	52.15		44,951	52.22		

== March 2006 election ==
The following table shows the results of the 2006 election.

Party	Ward			List			Total seats
Party	Votes	%	Seats	Votes	%	Seats	Total seats
Inkatha Freedom Party	15,867	59.75	11	15,732	59.39	5	16
African National Congress	8,820	33.22	2	8,917	33.66	7	9
Democratic Alliance	997	3.75	0	987	3.73	1	1
African Christian Democratic Party	494	1.86	0	480	1.81	0	0
Freedom Front Plus	264	0.99	0	374	1.41	0	0
National Democratic Convention	112	0.42	0				0
Total	26,554	100.00	13	26,490	100.00	13	26
Valid votes	26,554	97.81		26,490	97.74		
Invalid/blank votes	595	2.19		613	2.26		
Total votes	27,149	100.00		27,103	100.00		
Registered voters/turnout	47,521	57.13		47,521	57.03		

== May 2011 election ==
The following table shows the results of the 2011 election.

Party	Ward			List			Total seats
Party	Votes	%	Seats	Votes	%	Seats	Total seats
African National Congress	14,674	44.62	10	15,126	46.03	3	13
Inkatha Freedom Party	8,918	27.12	3	8,777	26.71	5	8
National Freedom Party	7,490	22.78	1	7,272	22.13	5	6
Democratic Alliance	1,261	3.83	0	1,200	3.65	1	1
African Christian Democratic Party	242	0.74	0	297	0.90	0	0
Congress of the People	192	0.58	0	186	0.57	0	0
Independent candidates	107	0.33	0				0
Total	32,884	100.00	14	32,858	100.00	14	28
Valid votes	32,884	97.96		32,858	97.96		
Invalid/blank votes	685	2.04		683	2.04		
Total votes	33,569	100.00		33,541	100.00		
Registered voters/turnout	53,300	62.98		53,300	62.93		

== August 2016 election ==
The following table shows the results of the 2016 election.

Party	Ward			List			Total seats
Party	Votes	%	Seats	Votes	%	Seats	Total seats
African National Congress	17,722	50.64	14	18,697	53.93	1	15
Inkatha Freedom Party	7,844	22.41	1	7,869	22.70	6	7
Congress of the People	3,633	10.38	0	3,599	10.38	3	3
Democratic Alliance	1,984	5.67	0	1,990	5.74	2	2
Economic Freedom Fighters	1,241	3.55	0	1,155	3.33	1	1
African Independent Congress	1,117	3.19	0	1,207	3.48	1	1
Independent candidates	1,427	4.08	0				0
People's Revolutionary Movement	30	0.09	0	149	0.43	0	0
Total	34,998	100.00	15	34,666	100.00	14	29
Valid votes	34,998	97.08		34,666	96.84		
Invalid/blank votes	1,051	2.92		1,131	3.16		
Total votes	36,049	100.00		35,797	100.00		
Registered voters/turnout	60,152	59.93		60,152	59.51		

== November 2021 election ==
The African National Congress (ANC) lost its majority, falling from 15 to 8 seats, but retained control in conjunction with the African People's Movement (Apemo) and National Freedom Party (NFP).

The following table shows the results of the 2021 election.

Party	Ward			List			Total seats
Party	Votes	%	Seats	Votes	%	Seats	Total seats
Inkatha Freedom Party	10,049	30.24	8	10,227	30.74	1	9
African National Congress	9,634	28.99	3	9,751	29.31	5	8
African People's Movement	6,570	19.77	3	6,460	19.41	3	6
Economic Freedom Fighters	2,017	6.07	0	2,040	6.13	2	2
National Freedom Party	1,732	5.21	1	1,708	5.13	1	2
Democratic Alliance	1,049	3.16	0	1,035	3.11	1	1
National Peoples Ambassadors	526	1.58	0	515	1.55	1	1
Freedom Front Plus	388	1.17	0	318	0.96	0	0
African Transformation Movement	291	0.88	0	254	0.76	0	0
Abantu Batho Congress	269	0.81	0	223	0.67	0	0
National People's Front	202	0.61	0	116	0.35	0	0
Congress of the People	135	0.41	0	125	0.38	0	0
African People's Convention	56	0.17	0	157	0.47	0	0
National Democratic Convention	81	0.24	0	99	0.30	0	0
People's Revolutionary Movement	75	0.23	0	100	0.30	0	0
United Democratic Movement	50	0.15	0	58	0.17	0	0
African Mantungwa Community	60	0.18	0	45	0.14	0	0
United Cultural Movement	46	0.14	0	43	0.13	0	0
Total	33,230	100.00	15	33,274	100.00	14	29
Valid votes	33,230	97.86		33,274	98.18		
Invalid/blank votes	725	2.14		616	1.82		
Total votes	33,955	100.00		33,890	100.00		
Registered voters/turnout	61,114	55.56		61,114	55.45		

=== By-elections from November 2021 ===
The following by-elections were held to fill vacant ward seats in the period from the election in November 2021.

Date	Ward	Party of the previous councillor	Party of the newly elected councillor
2 February 2022	6	Inkatha Freedom Party	Inkatha Freedom Party

== November 2026 election ==
The following table shows the results of the 2026 election.

Party	Ward			List			Total seats
Party	Votes	%	Seats	Votes	%	Seats	Total seats
Inkatha Freedom Party	9,900	26.35	6	9,867	26.22	2	8
uMkhonto weSizwe Party	9,369	24.94	6	9,752	25.91	2	8
African National Congress	6,681	17.78	2	6,589	17.51	3	5
National Peoples Ambassadors	2,921	7.77	1	2,807	7.46	1	2
Democratic Alliance	2,469	6.57	0	2,550	6.78	2	2
African People's Movement	2,346	6.24	0	2,263	6.01	2	2
Freedom Front Plus	1,560	4.15	0	1,586	4.21	1	1
Economic Freedom Fighters	458	1.22	0	469	1.25	1	1
National Freedom Party	370	0.98	0	390	1.04	0	0
National Economic Freedom Alliance	319	0.85	0	279	0.74	0	0
African Transformation Movement	236	0.63	0	252	0.67	0	0
Afrika Mayibuye Movement	250	0.67	0	209	0.56	0	0
African Independent Congress	201	0.53	0	143	0.38	0	0
South African Communist Party	103	0.27	0	134	0.36	0	0
African Christian Democratic Party	99	0.26	0	84	0.22	0	0
Abantu Bezwelethu Congress Democracy	36	0.10	0	78	0.21	0	0
United Cultural Movement	45	0.12	0	54	0.14	0	0
African Mantungwa Community	55	0.15	0	33	0.09	0	0
African Renaissance Unity	30	0.08	0	55	0.15	0	0
International Revelation Congress	26	0.07	0	42	0.11	0	0
Independent candidates	61	0.16	0				0
African Congress for Transformation	37	0.10	0				0
Total	37,572	100.00	15	37,636	100.00	14	29
Valid votes	37,572	98.11		37,636	98.38		
Invalid/blank votes	723	1.89		621	1.62		
Total votes	38,295	100.00		38,257	100.00		
Registered voters/turnout	68,749	55.70		68,749	55.65		
