= JUSCANZ =

Informal grouping of countries

The JUSCANZ Group is an informal, information-sharing coalition of like-minded countries at the United Nations Human Rights Council and other United Nations bodies, such as the Second, Third Committees and UN Trade and Development (UNCTAD). In the United Nations Regional Grouping system, it is considered as a subsection of the Western European and Others Group (WEOG), as most of its members are members of that Group. Its aim is to counterbalance the sway of the European Union bloc in WEOG matters.

The name of the group is derived from the acronym of its founding members Japan, the United States, Canada, Australia and New Zealand.

== Role ==
The Group's role is mainly to act as a tool for information-sharing at the United Nations. Unlike the United Nations Regional Groups, JUSCANZ is not a policy-coordination mechanism.

Members of the Group are not expected to reach consensus positions on issues. Rather, at JUSCANZ meetings, members meet to share information on the status of resolutions and to flag potential problems or issues for other delegations.

== History ==
On 22 January 2010, Israel was permitted to join the Group for sessions at the United Nations Office at Geneva, but not at the United Nations Headquarters in New York, nor at the other two major office sites of Vienna and Nairobi.

On 11 February 2014, Israel was allowed to join the Group in all relevant United Nations Committees at Headquarters in New York.

South Korea joined the Group in UNCTAD in 2021. It had already been a member of the Group outside of UNCTAD previously.

The United Kingdom joined the Group in 2021.

== Members ==
While membership of the group is not fixed, and its membership has varied throughout its history, the main members that have partaken in meetings of the Group include:

- Andorra (Note: Members of JUSCANZ in the Third Committee only)
- Australia
- Canada
- Iceland
- Israel (Note: Members of JUSCANZ in the Third Committee and UNCTAD only) (Note: Participating in JUSCANZ in the Second Committee on a case-by-case basis)
- Japan
- South Korea
- Liechtenstein
- New Zealand
- Norway
- San Marino
- Switzerland
- Turkey (Note: Member of JUSCANZ in the UNCTAD only)
- United Kingdom
- United States

Although Mexico is not a member of the Group, it participates in JUSCANZ in the Second Committee on a case-by-case basis.

== See also ==
- Anglosphere
- JACKSNNZ
- Umbrella Group
- Western European and Others Group
