= Environmental Integrity Group =

The Environmental Integrity Group (EIG) is a negotiation group consisting of six parties to the UNFCCC. When it was formed in 2000, it only consisted of Switzerland, Korea, and Mexico.

== History ==
The Environmental Integrity Group was initiated by Switzerland during the negotiations of the Kyoto Protocol, where only party groups were allowed to negotiate. Switzerland was not part of any group and they did not want to join the Umbrella Group. So Switzerland declared to form the EIG and invited other independent parties to join.

== Joint Submissions ==
- 2016 on matters of the Global Stock Take (GST)

== Members ==
- 2000 Switzerland (founding member)
- 2000 South Korea (founding member)
- 2000 Mexico (founding member)
- 20?? Liechtenstein
- 2001 Monaco
- 2017 Georgia

== Literature and References ==
Literature

- Emily Laur: Who is the Environmental Integrity Group?, In: Digital Lotus: Thursday, March 24, 2016.

'References
