= Royith Bhoola =

South African politician

Royith Baloo Bhoola is a South African politician who represented the Minority Front (MF) in the National Assembly of South Africa from 2004 to 2014.

Born in Pietermaritzburg in KwaZulu-Natal, he joined the Minority Front in 1999 and served as a local councillor in Umdoni Local Municipality. He was elected to the National Assembly in the 2004 general election and was elected to a second term in the 2009 general election. During his second term, and until the party lost all of its seats in the 2014 election, he was the only representative of the Minority Front in the assembly.

== Political career ==
Political Background: He was introduced to politics by Mr Amirchand “The Tiger” Rajbansi in 2000. He is a businessman with a commerce qualification, as well as business administration from what was then known as the Supreme Commercial College. He has a high level of business acumen and remained in business for a number of years, but was also involved in the promotion of arts and culture and with child welfare organisations. His involvement with politics is owed to him being involved with organisations outside of business. The breakthrough in politics came after hosting a very big sporting event. At that function, the late Tiger introduced himself. He joined the MF in 1999 and was elected as a Councillor in 2000 in the Umdoni Municipality. He served at the municipality up until 2004. He was then elevated to the National Parliament in 2004. He served on the Human Settlements and Social Development Portfolio Committees and was an alternate Member on the Basic Education Portfolio Committee. He also attained the Parliament’s leadership programme in politics.

Political party establishment: The Allied Movement for Change (AM4C) is a political party founded in 2014 by former Member of Parliament, Roy Bhoola.

After contesting their first elections in 2016, they gained seats in local government, and were able to translate the vision of re-imagining the role of both Ward and PR Councilors, as Servant Leaders.

They are working, to put South Africans FIRST, through ensuring sustained Service Delivery.
