= Independent Alliance of Latin America and the Caribbean =

Grouping of countries

The Independent Association of Latin America and the Caribbean (Spanish Asociación Independiente de Latinoamérica y el Caribe, AILAC) is a grouping of countries from Latin America and the Caribbean that cooperate on certain issues as a bloc in international climate negotiations, such as in the UNFCCC. The group was created in Doha, Qatar at the 18th Conference of the Parties by Colombia, Costa Rica, Chile, Peru, Guatemala and Panama and supported by the Dominican Republic, breaking from the Group of 77 on some issues notably the level of commitments for developing countries. The group presents itself as a "third way" in the North–South, rich–poor divide in climate change negotiations.

Groupings are not mutually exclusive and some members participate in and/or with multiple negotiating groups such as the Alliance of Small Island States (AOSIS), the Central American Integration System (SICA in Spanish), the Coalition for Rainforest Nations, Community of Latin American and Caribbean States (CELAC), and the Climate Vulnerable Forum. AILAC has also written joint Submissions with Mexico.

== AILAC member states ==
- Chile
- Colombia
- Costa Rica
- Guatemala
- Honduras
- Panama
- Peru
