= Team Sugar South Africa =

Political party in South Africa

Team Sugar
- Leader: Musa "Sugar" Thwala
- Split from: Economic Freedom Fighters
- National Assembly seats: 0 / 400
- NCOP seats: 0 / 90
- Provincial Legislatures: 0 / 430

Team Sugar is a South African political party chiefly present in northern KwaZulu-Natal. It broke away from the Economic Freedom Fighters and was initially active as a labour and social movement focusing on factory worker rights.

The party formed part of the governing coalition in Newcastle. Leader Musa "Sugar" Thwala was deputy mayor until being voted out by his colleagues in March 2024.

The party didn't enter the 2024 South African general election, and prior to the 2026 municipal elections Thwala formed a new party, the Amandla Awethu Movement.

== Election results ==
The party first contested the 2021 municipal elections, winning seven seats in the Newcastle Local Municipality, three seats in the Amajuba District Municipality and one in the Dannhauser Local Municipality.

The party retained a ward seat in a Newcastle by-election after its coalition partner, the Inkatha Freedom Party, agreed to support its candidate.

=== Municipal elections ===
Election	Votes	%
2021	27,722	0.09%
