= Independent Alliance =

Independent Alliance may refer to:

- Independent Alliance (Ireland), a political grouping in the Republic of Ireland
- Independent Alliance of Mozambique, a political party in Mozambique
- Independent Alliance of Latin America and the Caribbean, a grouping of countries that cooperate on certain issues as a block in international climate negotiations
- Independent Alliance Party, a former political party in the Canadian territory of Yukon
- Independent Alliance for Reform, a political grouping in the British nation of Wales
- Independent Alliance (UK), a political grouping in the United Kingdom House of Commons
