= Minority Front =

Political party in South Africa

- Leader: Shameen Thakur-Rajbansi
- Founded: 1 November 1993
- Preceded by: National People's Party
- Headquarters: 13175 Peak Street, Arena Park, Westcliff, Chatsworth, Durban
- Ideology: Indian minority interests
- Slogan: Your Choice and Voice All the Way
- National Assembly seats: 0 / 400
- KZN Legislature seats: 0 / 80

Website
- www.minorityfront.org

The Minority Front (MF) is a political party in South Africa. The party represents all minorities of South Africa, however, its support comes mainly from the South African Indian community. Its voter base is in the province of KwaZulu-Natal. The eThekwini district (Durban) is the cultural and demographic centre of South Africa's Indian community. The party was founded in 1993 and led by Amichand Rajbansi until his death in December 2011.

== History ==
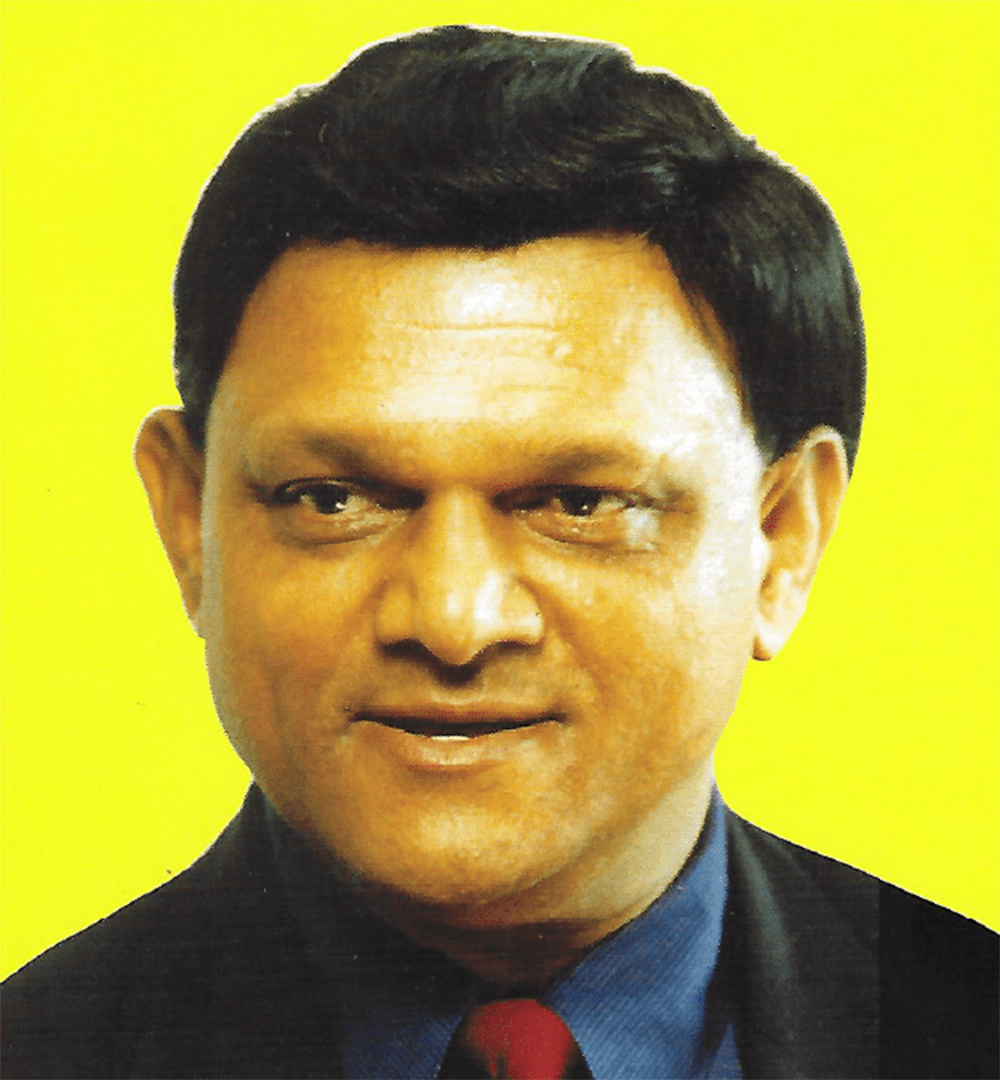
Amichand Rajbansi: Founder of the Minority Front

The Minority Front was formed as a successor to the National People's Party (NPP), which was an important party led by the late Mr. A. Rajbansi in the Indian-only House of Delegates in the Tricameral Parliament.

Rajbansi's widow and colleague in the KwaZulu-Natal Legislature, Shameen Thakur-Rajbansi, was voted in as leader in January 2012. A leadership and family battle erupted when an attempt was made to replace Thakur-Rajbansi as leader, with Amichand Rajbansi's son, Vimal, and first wife, Asha Devi Rajbansi, asking her to step down, and a breakaway conference (not recognized by the IEC) elected Roy Bhoola, who Thakur-Rajbansi had attempted to remove from public office. Thakur-Rajbansi was declared the undisputed leader in December 2013, after the parties settled their disputes in a confidential agreement.

== Election results ==
The party contested each election from 1994 until 2019, winning national representation in 1999, 2004 and 2009, and provincial representation in KwaZulu-Natal each time. It is not contesting in 2024.

=== National elections ===
Election	Total votes	Share of vote	Seats	+/–	Government
1994	13,433	0.07%	0 / 400	–	extra-parliamentary
1999	48,277	0.30%	1 / 400	▲1	in opposition
2004	55,267	0.35%	2 / 400	▲1	in opposition
2009	43,474	0.25%	1 / 400	▼1	in opposition
2014	22,589	0.12%	0 / 400	▼1	extra-parliamentary
2019	11,961	0.07%	0 / 400	±0	extra-parliamentary
2024	endorsed ANC		0 / 400	±0	extra-parliamentary

=== Provincial elections ===
Election	Eastern Cape		Free State		Gauteng		Kwazulu-Natal		Limpopo		Mpumalanga		North-West		Northern Cape		Western Cape	
Election	%	Seats	%	Seats	%	Seats	%	Seats	%	Seats	%	Seats	%	Seats	%	Seats	%	Seats
1994	-	-	-	-	-	-	1.34%	1/80	-	-	-	-	-	-	-	-	-	-
1999	-	-	-	-	-	-	2.93%	2/80	-	-	-	-	-	-	-	-	-	-
2004	-	-	-	-	-	-	2.61%	2/80	-	-	-	-	-	-	-	-	-	-
2009	-	-	-	-	-	-	2.05%	2/80	-	-	-	-	-	-	-	-	-	-
2014	-	-	-	-	0.07%	0/73	1.02%	1/80	-	-	-	-	-	-	-	-	-	-
2019	-	-	-	-	-	-	0.52%	1/80	-	-	-	-	-	-	-	-	-	-

=== Municipal elections ===
Election	Votes	%
1995–96		
2000		0.3%
2006	84,785	0.3%
2011	113,195	0.4%
2016	13,407	0.03%
2021	8,304	0.03%

== Organisation and structure ==
=== Head office ===
The Minority Front's primary office is at 13175 Peak Street, Arena Park, Westcliff, Chatsworth, Durban.

=== Women's League ===
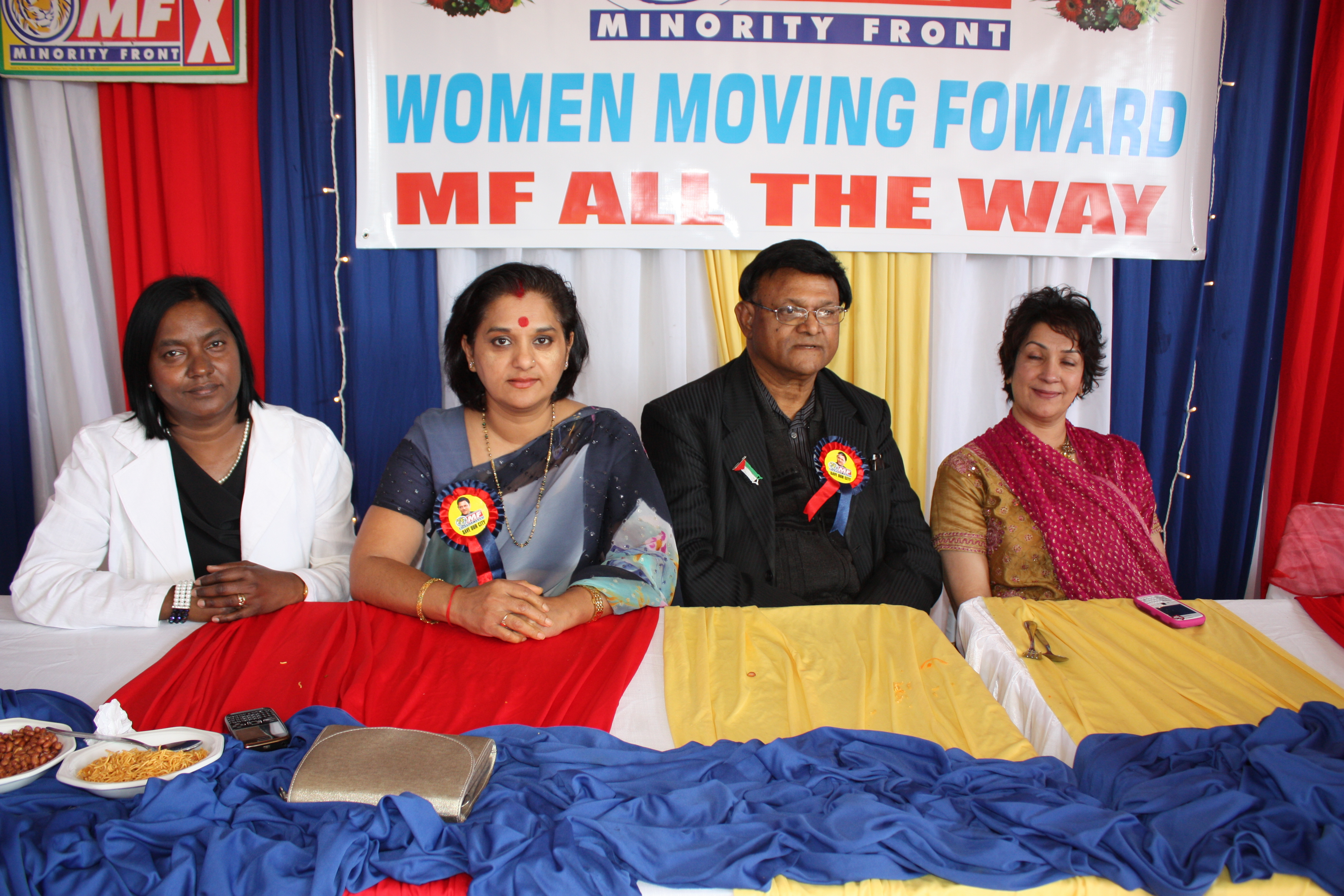

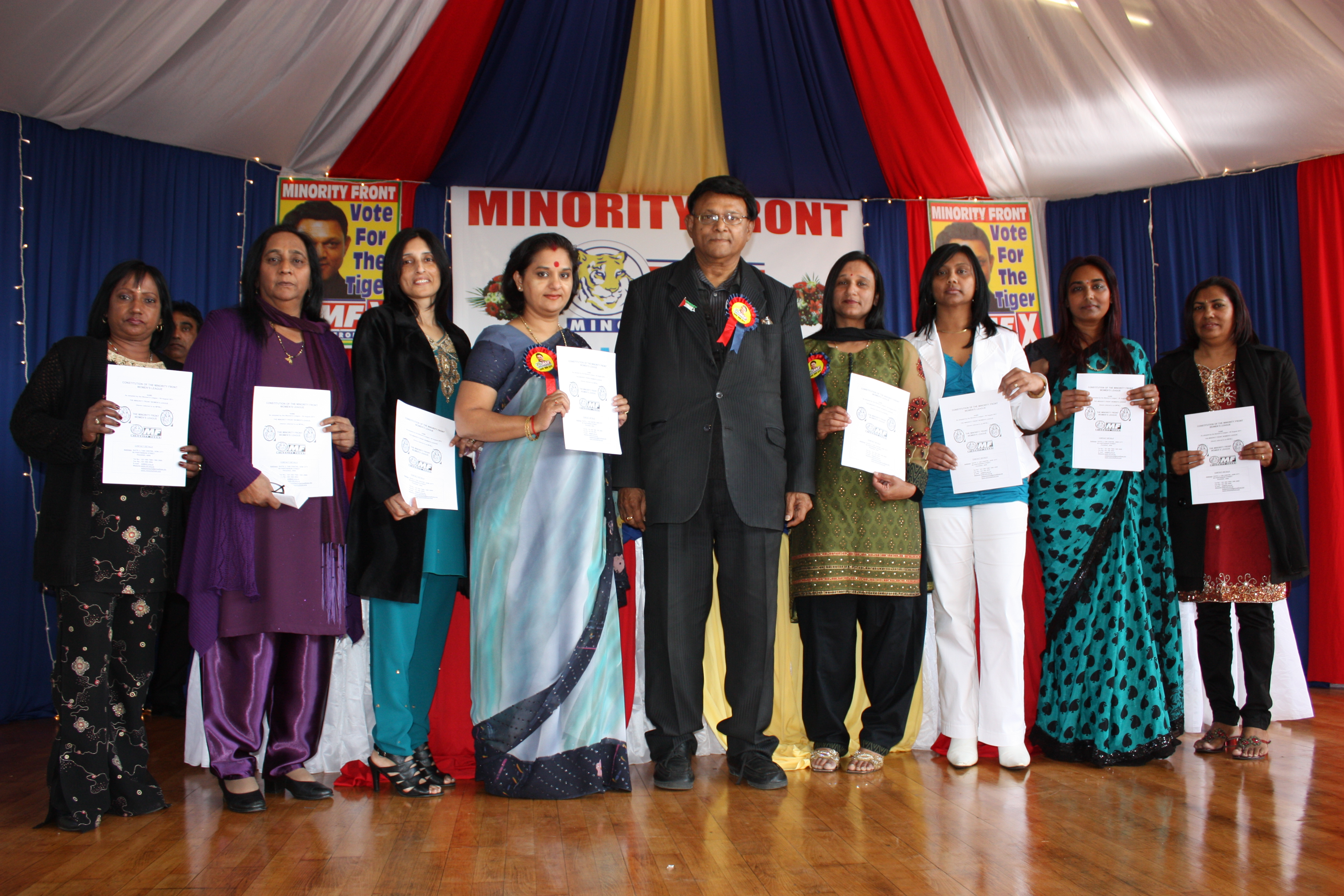

=== Youth League ===
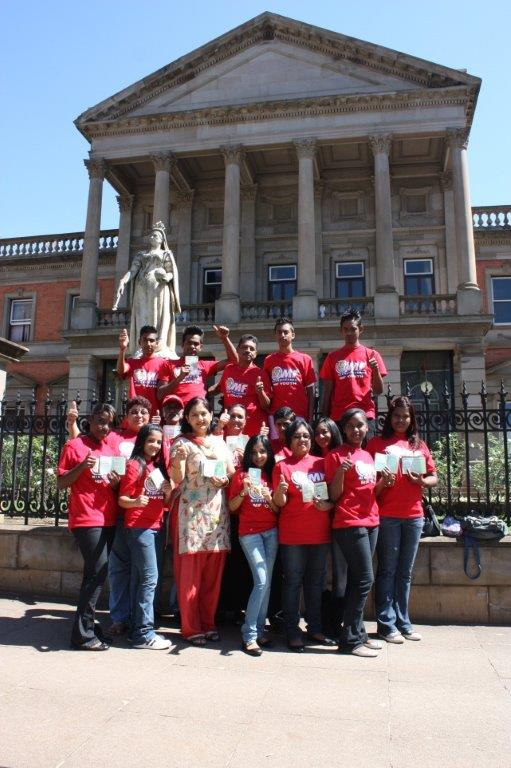

=== National Assembly ===
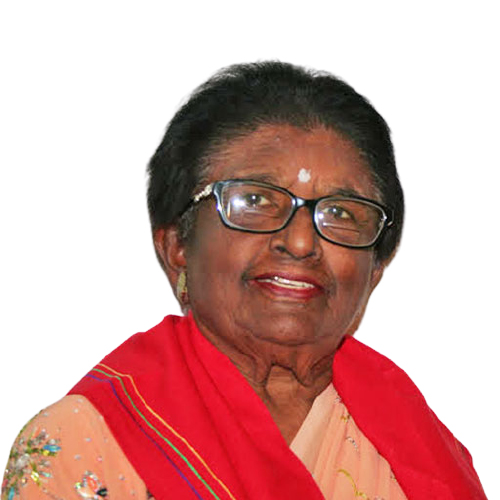

=== Leadership ===
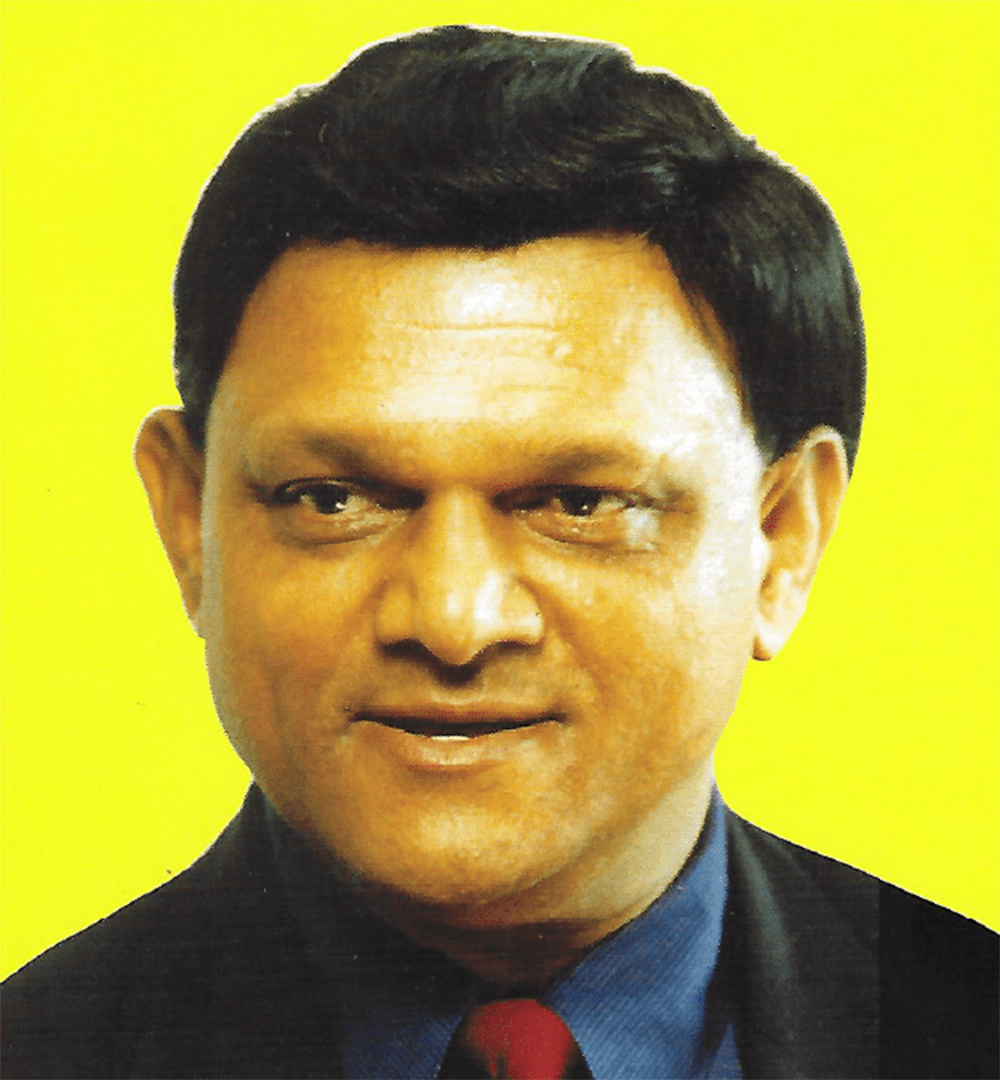
Amichand Rajbansi: Founder and past leader of the Minority Front (1993–2011).

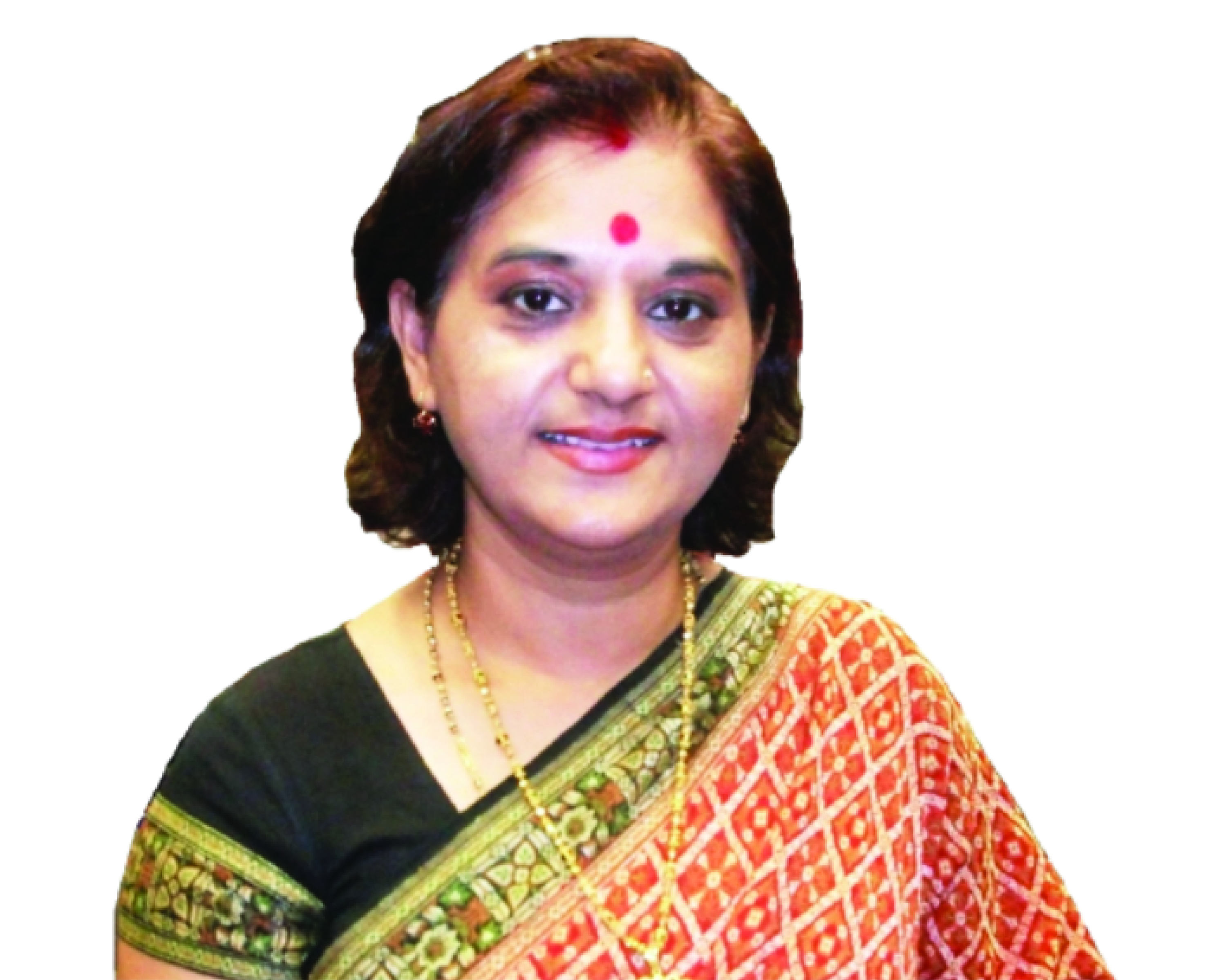
Hon. Shameen Thakur-Rajbansi: Leader of the Minority Front (2012-current).

== Events ==
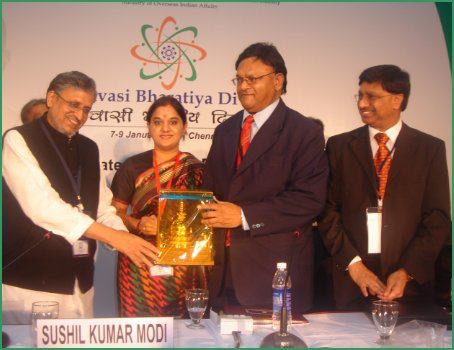
The late Mr A Rajbansi receiving the Lifetime Achievement Award from the India International Friendship Society in New Delhi (2008).

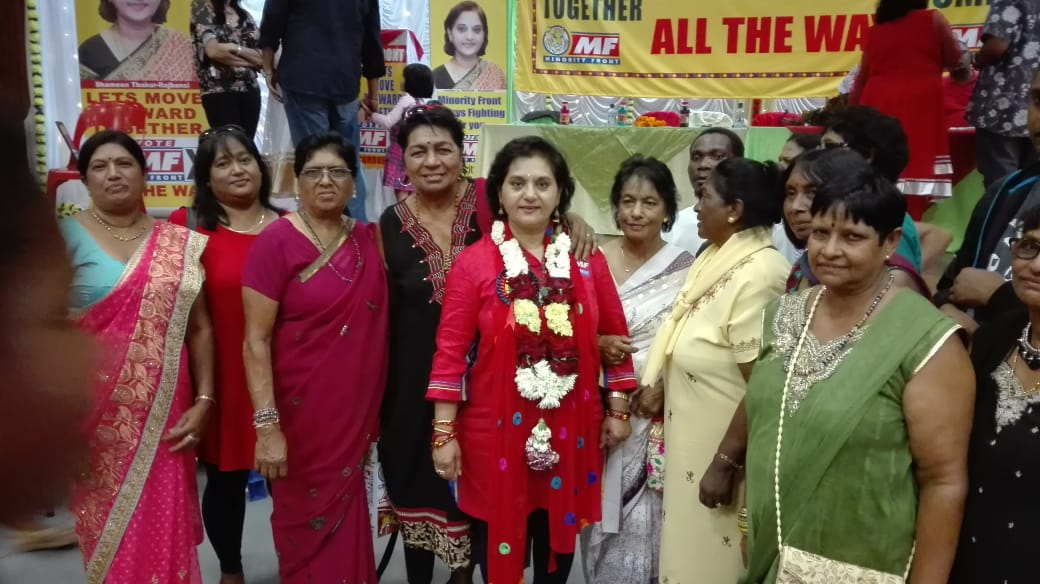
MF Women's League at the 2019 Election Manifesto Launch in Chatsworth.

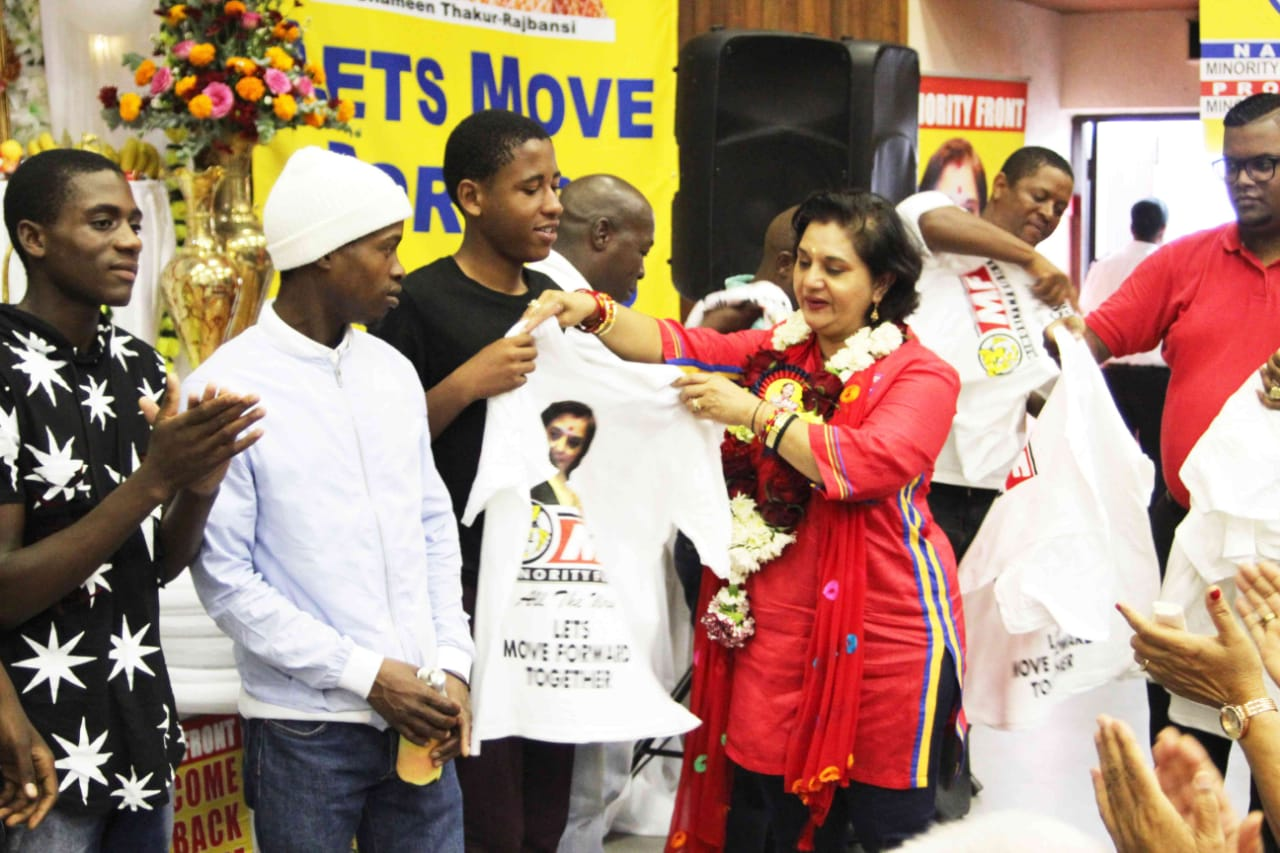
MF Leader, Hon Shameen Thakur-Rajbansi pictured with supporters at their 2019 Election Manifesto Launch in Chatsworth.

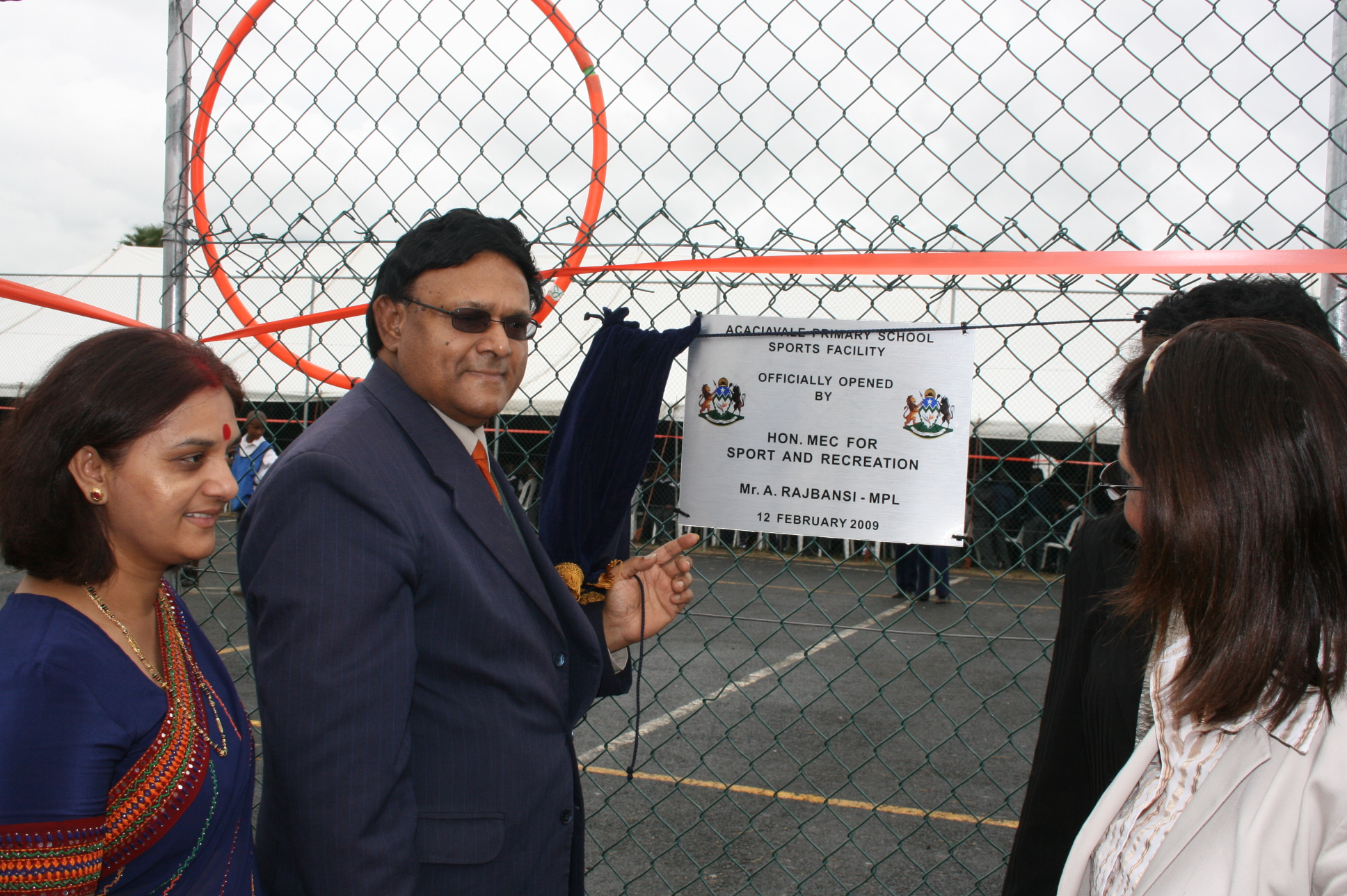
Opening of the Acaciavale Primary School Sports Facility in 2009 by Former MEC of Sport 2009, the Late Mr A Rajbansi
