= African People's Movement =

Political party in South Africa

- Founder: Vikizitha Mlotshwa
- Founded: 15 April 2021
- Split from: National Freedom Party
- Ideology: Progressivism; Ubuntu; Pan-Africanism
- National Assembly seats: 0 / 400
- Provincial Legislatures: 0 / 430

Website
- apemoonline.org

The African People's Movement (APEMO) is a South African political party formed by Vikizitha Mlotshwa, former chairperson of the National Freedom Party (NFP).

The party was noted for calling for the support of dagga farming as a means for rural women to support themselves.

== Election results ==
=== National Assembly elections ===
Election	Party leader	Total votes	Share of vote	Seats	+/–	Government
2024	Vikizitha Mlotshwa	4,601	0.03% (Note: From 2024, seats in the National Assembly are determined by a combination of the national ballot, and the nine regional ballots. Only the national ballot figures are shown here.)	0 / 400	New	Extra-parliamentary

=== Provincial elections ===
Election	Eastern Cape		Free State		Gauteng		Kwazulu-Natal		Limpopo		Mpumalanga		North-West		Northern Cape		Western Cape	
Election	%	Seats	%	Seats	%	Seats	%	Seats	%	Seats	%	Seats	%	Seats	%	Seats	%	Seats
2024							0.12	0/80										

=== Municipal elections ===
The party won six seats in the 2021 local government election in Okhahlamba, with Mlotshwa being elected mayor with the support of the African National Congress (ANC) and NFP.
