= Environmental law in the Middle East =

Based in Islamic religious tradition, Sharia utilizes religious teachings to determine law. While there is not a technical discipline of Islamic or Sharia-based environmental law, environmental laws justified by Islamic teachings have been made in various Middle Eastern countries, and scholars have argued that it is a legal branch. Much of Sharia that is used to explain environmental law originates from interpretations of the Qur'an and Hadith, the teachings of the prophet Muhammad.

== Islamic Sources of Environmental Law ==
=== Quranic Principles ===
In the Qur'an, guidance for environmentalism is outlined in principles that apply to many other parts of Islamic teachings and life. The main principles generally used to uphold environmental law include:

1. Khalifah: the doctrine of man's viceregency to Allah. In the context of environmentalism, it can be interpreted as a rule to not abuse the resources of the Earth for the benefit of future generations. More explicitly, verse 7:32 of the Qur'an states: "…eat and drink but exceed not the bounds; surely, He does not love those who exceed the bounds."
2. Tawhid: reinforces monotheism and Allah as a single creator. Further interpreted as encouraging "sensitivity to the natural environment" and to "live in harmony with the ecosystem."
3. Maslahah: the general principle of "removing harm." It has been argued that because Maslahah has been used to uphold public interest into law that this can be applied to issues of climate justice which fall under public interest.
4. 'Ubudiyyah: Man's place under Allah. Implied by scholars as a call to better the environment as a service to Allah.
5. Amanah: Trust, honesty, and loyalty. Trust towards Allah as a creator and his creations and creatures. Quranic justification for the preservation of nature.
6. Taharah: Principle of purification. Used to justify rules for not polluting water or disposing of waste improperly.

=== Specific Quranic Verses ===
The Islamic Declaration on Global Climate Change (2015), while not a binding legal doctrine, provided Quranic justification for the protection of the environment. More specifically, they incorporated the following verses:

- Nothing that He creates is without value: each thing is created bi ’l-haqq, in truth and for right. / And We did not create the heavens and earth and that between them in play. We have not created them but in truth – Qur’an 44: 38
- All that is in the heavens and the earth belongs to Allah. / Allah encompasses all things – Qur’an 4: 125
- He raised the heaven and established the balance / So that you would not transgress the balance. / Give just weight – do not skimp in the balance. / He laid out the earth for all living creatures. – Qur’an 55: 7–10
- So set your face firmly towards the (natural) Way / As a pure, natural believer / Allah’s natural pattern on which He made mankind / There is no changing Allah’s creation. / That is the true (natural) Way / But most people do not know it. – Quran 30: 30
- Corruption has appeared on land and sea / Because of what people’s own hands have wrought, / So that they may taste something of what they have done; / So that hopefully they will turn back. – Qur’an 30: 41
- There is no animal on the earth, or any bird that wings its flight, but is a community like you. – Qur’an 6: 38
- The creation of the heavens and the earth / Is far greater than the creation of mankind, / But most of mankind do not know it – Qur’an 40: 57
- He (God) wanted to test you regarding what has come to you. So compete with each other in doing good deeds. Qur’an 5: 48

Once again, while not legally binding, religious justifications for climate protection provided in the Islamic Declaration on Global Climate Change are exemplary of the intersection between Sharia and environmental law.

== Significant Middle Eastern Environmental Laws and Treaties ==
=== Paris Climate Agreement ===
The Islamic Declaration on Climate Change was crafted in preparation for the discussion of the Paris Climate Agreement in 2015. Though influenced by countries all around the world, the Agreement thus may have aligned with such principles, as all countries in the Middle East signed the Agreement. Egypt, Turkey, Iraq, Saudi Arabia, Syria, Jordan, United Arab Emirates, Israel, Lebanon, Palestine, Oman, Kuwait, Qatar, and Bahrain have all signed and ratified the Paris Agreement. Iran and Yemen also signed the Agreement in 2016, but it has yet to be ratified by either country.

=== 2011 Indonesian Fatwa on Global Climate Change ===
In an edict signed by the Indonesian Ulema Council (MUI), "destructive mining operations" were ruled haram under a 2011 fatwa responding to public question on how environmental damage is viewed under Sharia law. While Indonesia is not a country in the Middle East nor an Islamic-ruled country, the country is significantly majority Islam and incorporates such religious influences. Targeted at mining companies in an effort to reduce deforestation in the country, this fatwa is of significance to Islamic legal scholars because it is "rare" that a fatwa focuses on such environmental issues.

=== 2023 Indonesian Ulema Council Fatwa concerning Global Climate Change Control Law ===
Indonesia's advancement of Islamic approaches to environmental law continues with another fatwa that focuses more specifically on controlling climate change. It suggests "preventive measures to address the climate crisis, including contributing to climate change mitigation and adaptation, reducing the carbon footprint of basic needs, and carrying out a just energy transition."

== Current Middle Eastern Environmental Law Regimes by Country ==
| Rank (by population) | Country (or dependent territory) | Environmental Law (Current/Precedent) | Ministry / Governing Body | Religious Basis | | | | | |
|---|---|---|---|---|---|---|---|---|---|
| Rank (by population) | Country (or dependent territory) | Environmental Law (Current/Precedent) | Ministry / Governing Body | Religious Basis | 1 | Egypt | Law 4 of 1994 | Ministry of Environment Egyptian Environmental Affairs Agency (EEAA) | No specific mention of Sharia law |
| 2 | Iran | 1974 Environmental Protection Law | Department of Environment | | | | | | |
| 3 | Turkey | 2872 Environment Law (1983) | Ministry of Environment, Urbanisation and Climate Change | Sharia law banned in 1924 | | | | | |
| 4 | Iraq | Law 27 of 2009 | Iraqi Ministry of Environment | | | | | | |
| 5 | Saudi Arabia | Royal Decree No. M/165 of 2020 | Ministry of Environment, Water, and Agriculture | | | | | | |
| 6 | Yemen | Law No. 26 of 1995 on Environment Protection | Ministry of Water and Environment | | | | | | |
| 7 | Syria | Law No. 12, 2012 | Ministry of Local Administration and Environment | | | | | | |
| 8 | Jordan | Environmental Protection Law No. 6 of 2017 | Ministry of Environment | | | | | | |
| 9 | United Arab Emirates | Federal Law No. 24 of 1999 on the Protection and Development of the Environment | Ministry of Climate Change and Environment Beeatna Environment Agency Environment Protection and Development Authority | | | | | | |
| 10 | Israel | The Environmental Protection Law (5732-1972) | Ministry of Environmental Protection | | | | | | |
| 11 | Lebanon | Law No. 444 of 2002 on environmental protection | Ministry of Environment | | | | | | |
| 12 | Palestine (West Bank and Gaza Strip) | Law No. 7/199 on the Environment | Environment Quality Authority (EQA) | | | | | | |
| 13 | Oman | Royal Decree 114/2001 – The Law on the Conservation of the Environment and Pollution Prevention | Ministry of Environment and Climate Affairs | | | | | | |
| 14 | Kuwait | Environmental Protection Law No. 42 of 2014 | Environment Public Authority | | | | | | |
| 15 | Qatar | Law No. 30 of 2002 Environmental Protection Law | Ministry of Environment and Climate Change | | | | | | |
| 16 | Bahrain | Law No. 7 of 2022 on the Environment | The Supreme Council for Environment | | | | | | |
