= Enhanced Transparency Framework =

The Enhanced Transparency Framework (ETF) specifies how parties to the Paris Agreement, which includes almost every country in the world, report on their progress in limiting and adapting to climate change. Thus it is a central component of the design, credibility and operation of the Agreement.

The reports also include support provided or received, and the framework specifies international procedures for the review and evaluation of the reports. With the creation of the Transparency Framework, a uniform reporting system was created that requires all Parties to disclose essential climate policy information.

== Background ==
The adoption of the Paris Agreement marked a turning point in international climate policy, one which had previously been initiated at the Climate Change Conference in Copenhagen in 2009. The Agreement, which is binding under international law and global in scope, not only sets ambitious global goals, such as limiting the rise in the Earth's average temperature to well below 2 °C compared to pre-industrial levels, but also introduced a new climate policy paradigm that gives states considerable leeway in setting their climate change goals – Parties’ individual goals are not negotiated at international level but are instead set by the Parties themselves. Also, compliance with those goals is not binding. To ensure that the targets and goals they have set are implemented nonetheless, an innovative architecture comprising international review and transparency mechanisms has been integrated into the Agreement. The Transparency Framework is an essential element of that architecture.

== Role of the Transparency Framework in the Paris climate regime ==
The Paris Agreement requires its signatory states (known as Parties) to formulate their own regular climate action plans, so-called nationally determined contributions (NDCs). When updated, those NDCs must not fall short of the targets applicable prior to the update and should reflect the highest possible level of ambition. Parties are also required to implement measures that contribute to achieving their NDCS. There is, however, no obligation under international law to achieve the NDCs and no sanctions are provided for in the event of Parties’ failure to achieve them.

Against this backdrop, the Transparency Framework is of central importance. Parties must report regularly on their progress in implementing their NDC targets and goals, and the reports are subject to international peer review. The Transparency Framework thus creates the basis for the global public to publicly name and denounce those states that have failed to meet their self-imposed targets and goals. This procedure, known as “naming and shaming”, could offset the lack of binding NDC achievement and is thus a central pillar of the Paris regime.

The Transparency Framework is also an essential part of the NDC cycle. The information gathered in line with the Transparency Framework is fed into the Global Stocktake which assesses collective progress towards the long-term goals. The outcomes of the stocktake are in turn taken into account when developing nationally determined contributions (NDCs).

== Reporting under the Transparency Framework ==
The reporting requirements set out in the Transparency Framework of the Paris Agreement go beyond and also replace the previous requirements for the disclosure of information under the Framework Convention on Climate Change.

From 2024 onwards, all Parties must submit what are known as Biennial Transparency Reports (BTRs) every two years. With these transparency reports, Parties submit their greenhouse gas inventories and disclose information on progress made in implementing their NDCs. Unlike the reporting requirements under the Framework Convention on Climate Change, when it comes to climate action, the Transparency Framework makes no distinction between industrialised and developing countries, and the requirements apply to all states. However, developing countries with limited capacities have been given the opportunity to deviate from the requirements and to report to a lesser extent, less frequently or in less detail. Countries wishing to make use of this flexibility must, however, justify their need to do so and indicate a date by which they will have overcome the obstacles that stand in the way of full reporting.

In addition to climate change mitigation, the Transparency Framework covers various other issues. For example, information on the effects of climate change and action taken to adapt to climate change is collected on a voluntary basis. In addition, the Transparency Framework serves to collect information on climate action-related support. However, with regard to financial assistance provided, there is only a reporting requirement for industrialised countries. The Transparency Framework also gathers information on support needed and that already received. Here, too, however, there is no reporting requirement for developing countries.

It should also be noted that Parties using the market-based cooperation approaches enshrined in Article 6 of the Paris Agreement must report on emission reductions transferred as part of that approach. These requirements are intended to prevent emission reductions from being counted more than once and to avoid undermining the environmental integrity of the Paris Agreement.

== Review and evaluation of the reports ==
The Paris Agreement also established a two-stage international procedure for reviewing and evaluating reports. Implementation rules for both steps were set out at the Conference of the Parties in Katowice in December 2018:

Step 1 comprises the Technical Expert Reviews. These check whether the submitted reports comply with the provisions of the Transparency Framework and identify areas where there is potential for enhancement. Explicitly excluded from this review was the question of whether the NDC submitted by the respective Party is appropriate or to what extent the measures implemented are sufficient. An assessment of this kind is not compatible with the bottom-up approach of the Paris Agreement, under which Parties set their own NDCs.

Step 2 involves the Facilitative, Multilateral Consideration of Progress. Here, Parties share their questions and answers with one another. The exchange takes place both in writing and in workshops.
