= ICTU =

ICTU may refer to:

- Irish Congress of Trade Unions
- Information to facilitate clarity, transparency and understanding accompanying a country's nationally determined contribution to limiting climate change
