= János Pásztor =

János Pásztor may refer to:

- János Pásztor (sculptor)
- Janos Pasztor (diplomat)
