= Paris Agreement =

2015 international treaty regarding climate change

Paris Agreement under the United Nations Framework Convention on Climate Change
- State parties Signatories Parties that withdrew Parties also covered by European Union ratification Agreement does not apply
- Drafted: 30 November – 12 December 2015 in Le Bourget, France
- Signed: 22 April 2016; 10 years ago
- Location: Paris, France
- Effective: 4 November 2016; 10 years ago
- Condition: Ratification and accession by 55 UNFCCC parties, accounting for 55% of global greenhouse gas emissions
- Signatories: 195
- Parties: 194 (list)
- Depositary: Secretary-General of the United Nations
- Languages: Arabic; Chinese; English; French; Russian; Spanish

Full text
- Paris Agreement at Wikisource

The Paris Agreement (also called the Paris Accords or Paris Climate Accords) is an international treaty on climate change that was signed in 2016. The treaty covers climate change mitigation, adaptation, and finance. The Paris Agreement was negotiated by 196 parties at the 2015 United Nations Climate Change Conference near Paris, France. As of January 2026, 194 members of the United Nations Framework Convention on Climate Change (UNFCCC) are parties to the agreement. Of the three UNFCCC member states which have not ratified the agreement, the only major emitter is Iran. The United States, the second largest emitter (with China being the first), withdrew from the agreement in 2020, rejoined in 2021, and withdrew again in 2026.

The Paris Agreement has a long-term temperature goal which is to keep the rise in global surface temperature to well below 2 °C (3.6 °F) above pre-industrial levels. The treaty also states that preferably the limit of the increase should only be 1.5 °C (2.7 °F). These limits are defined as averages of the global temperature measured over twenty years.

The lower the temperature increase, the smaller the effects of climate change can be expected. To achieve this temperature goal, greenhouse gas emissions should be reduced as soon as, and by as much as, possible. They should even reach net zero by the middle of the 21st century. To stay below 1.5 °C of global warming, emissions need to be cut by roughly 50% by 2030. This figure takes into account each country's documented pledges. After the Paris Agreement was signed, global emissions continued to rise rather than fall. 2024 was the hottest year on record, with a rise of more than 1.5 °C in global average temperature.

The treaty aims to help countries adapt to climate change effects, and mobilize enough finance. Under the agreement, each country must determine, plan, and regularly report on its contributions. No mechanism forces a country to set specific emissions targets, but each target should go beyond previous targets. In contrast to the 1997 Kyoto Protocol, the distinction between developed and developing countries is blurred, so that the latter also have to submit plans for emission reductions.

The Paris Agreement was opened for signature on 22 April 2016 (Earth Day) at a ceremony inside the UN headquarters in New York City. After the European Union ratified the agreement, sufficient countries had ratified the agreement responsible for enough of the world's greenhouse gases for the agreement to enter into force on 4 November 2016.

World leaders have lauded the agreement. However, there is debate about its effectiveness, with some environmentalists and analysts criticizing it for not being strict enough. While pledges under the Paris Agreement are insufficient for reaching the set temperature goals, there is a mechanism of increased ambition. The Paris Agreement has been successfully used in climate litigation in the late 2010s, forcing countries and oil companies to strengthen climate action.

== Aims ==
The aim of the agreement, as described in Article 2, is to have a stronger response to the danger of climate change; it seeks to enhance the implementation of the United Nations Framework Convention on Climate Change through:

(a) Holding the increase in the global average temperature to well below 2 °C above pre-industrial levels and to pursue efforts to limit the temperature increase to 1.5 °C above pre-industrial levels, recognizing that this would significantly reduce the risks and impacts of climate change;

(b) Increasing the ability to adapt to the adverse impacts of climate change and foster climate resilience and low greenhouse gas emissions development, in a manner that does not threaten food production;

(c) Making finance flows consistent with a pathway towards low greenhouse gas emissions and climate-resilient development.

Countries furthermore aim to reach "global peaking of greenhouse gas emissions as soon as possible".

== Development ==
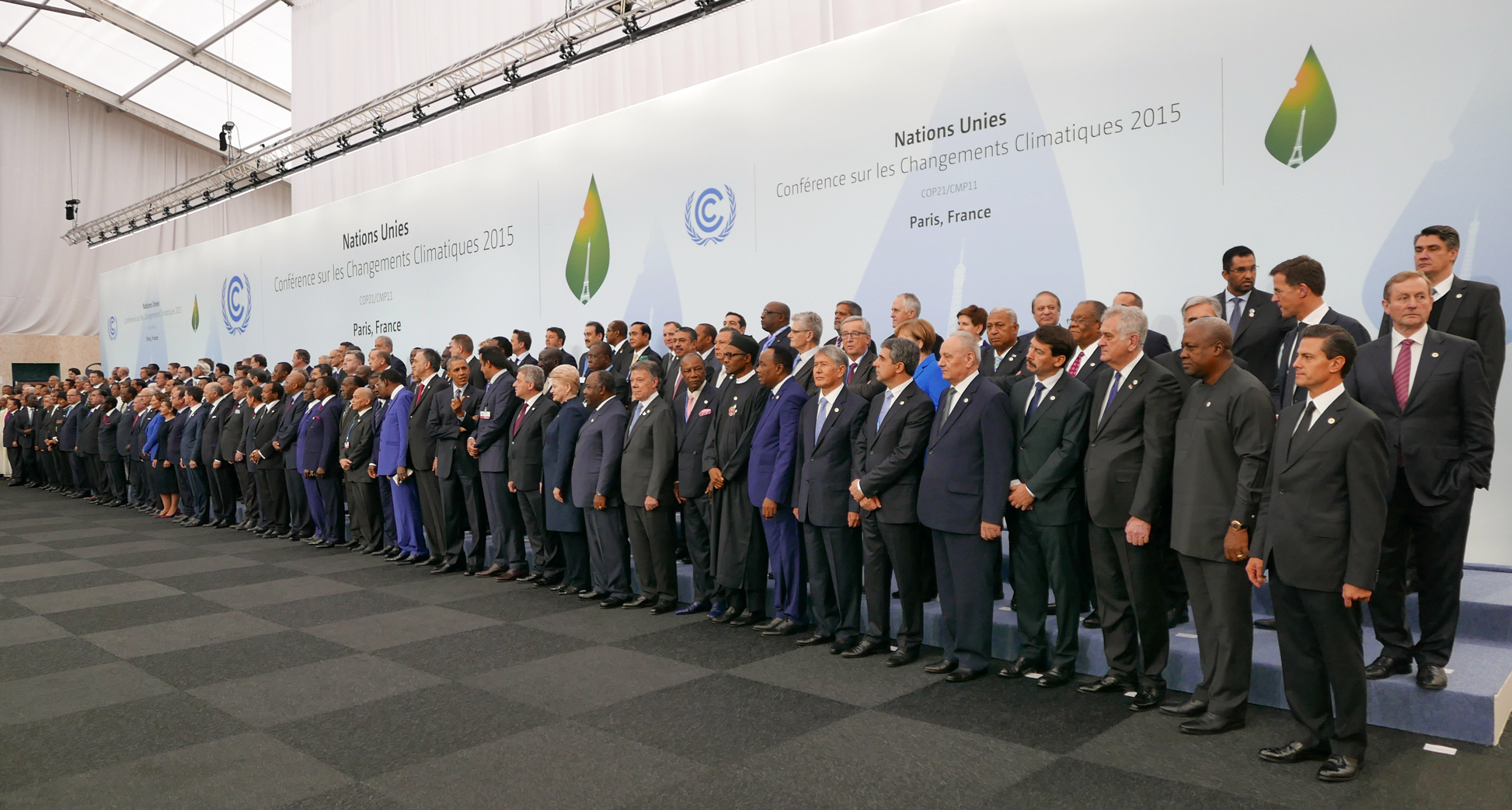
Heads of delegations at the 2015 United Nations Climate Change Conference in Paris

=== Lead-up ===
The UN Framework Convention on Climate Change (UNFCCC), adopted at the 1992 Earth Summit is one of the first international treaties on the topic. It stipulates that parties should meet regularly to address climate change, at the Conference of Parties or COP. It forms the foundation to future climate agreements.

The Kyoto Protocol, adopted in 1997, regulated greenhouse gas reductions for a limited set of countries from 2008 to 2012. The protocol was extended until 2020 with the Doha Amendment in 2012. The United States decided not to ratify the protocol, mainly because of its legally-binding nature. This, and distributional conflict, led to failures of subsequent international climate negotiations. The 2009 negotiations were intended to produce a successor treaty of Kyoto, but the negotiations collapsed and the resulting Copenhagen Accord was not legally binding and did not get adopted universally.

The accord did lay the framework for bottom-up approach of the Paris Agreement. Under the leadership of UNFCCC executive secretary Christiana Figueres, negotiation regained momentum after Copenhagen's failure. During the 2011 United Nations Climate Change Conference, the Durban Platform was established to negotiate a legal instrument governing climate change mitigation measures from 2020. The platform had a mandate to be informed by the Fifth Assessment Report of the IPCC and the work of the subsidiary bodies of the UNFCCC. The resulting agreement was to be adopted in 2015.

=== Negotiations and adoption ===
Movie showing Laurent Fabius signaling the formal adoption of the Paris Agreement

Negotiations in Paris took place over a two-week span, and continued throughout the three final nights. Various drafts and proposals had been debated and streamlined in the preceding year. According to one commentator two ways in which the French increased the likelihood of success were: firstly to ensure that Intended Nationally Determined Contributions (INDCs) were completed before the start of the negotiations, and secondly to invite leaders just for the beginning of the conference.

The negotiations almost failed because of a single word when the US legal team realized at the last minute that "shall" had been approved, rather than "should", meaning that developed countries would have been legally obliged to cut emissions: the French solved the problem by changing it as a "typographical error". At the conclusion of COP21 (the 21st meeting of the Conference of the Parties), on 12 December 2015, the final wording of the Paris Agreement was adopted by consensus by the 195 UNFCCC participating member states and the European Union. Nicaragua indicated they had wanted to object to the adoption as they denounced the weakness of the agreement, but were not given a chance. In the agreement the members promised to reduce their carbon output "as soon as possible" and to do their best to keep global warming "to well below 2 degrees C" (3.6 °F).

=== Signing and entry into force ===
The Paris Agreement was open for signature by states and regional economic integration organizations that are parties to the UNFCCC (the convention) from 22 April 2016 to 21 April 2017 at the UN Headquarters in New York. Signing of the agreement is the first step towards ratification, but it is possible to accede to the agreement without signing. It binds parties to not act in contravention of the goal of the treaty. On 1 April 2016, the United States and China, which represent almost 40% of global emissions confirmed they would sign the Paris Climate Agreement. The agreement was signed by 175 parties (174 states and the European Union) on the first day it was opened for signature. As of January 2026, 194 states and the European Union have signed the agreement.

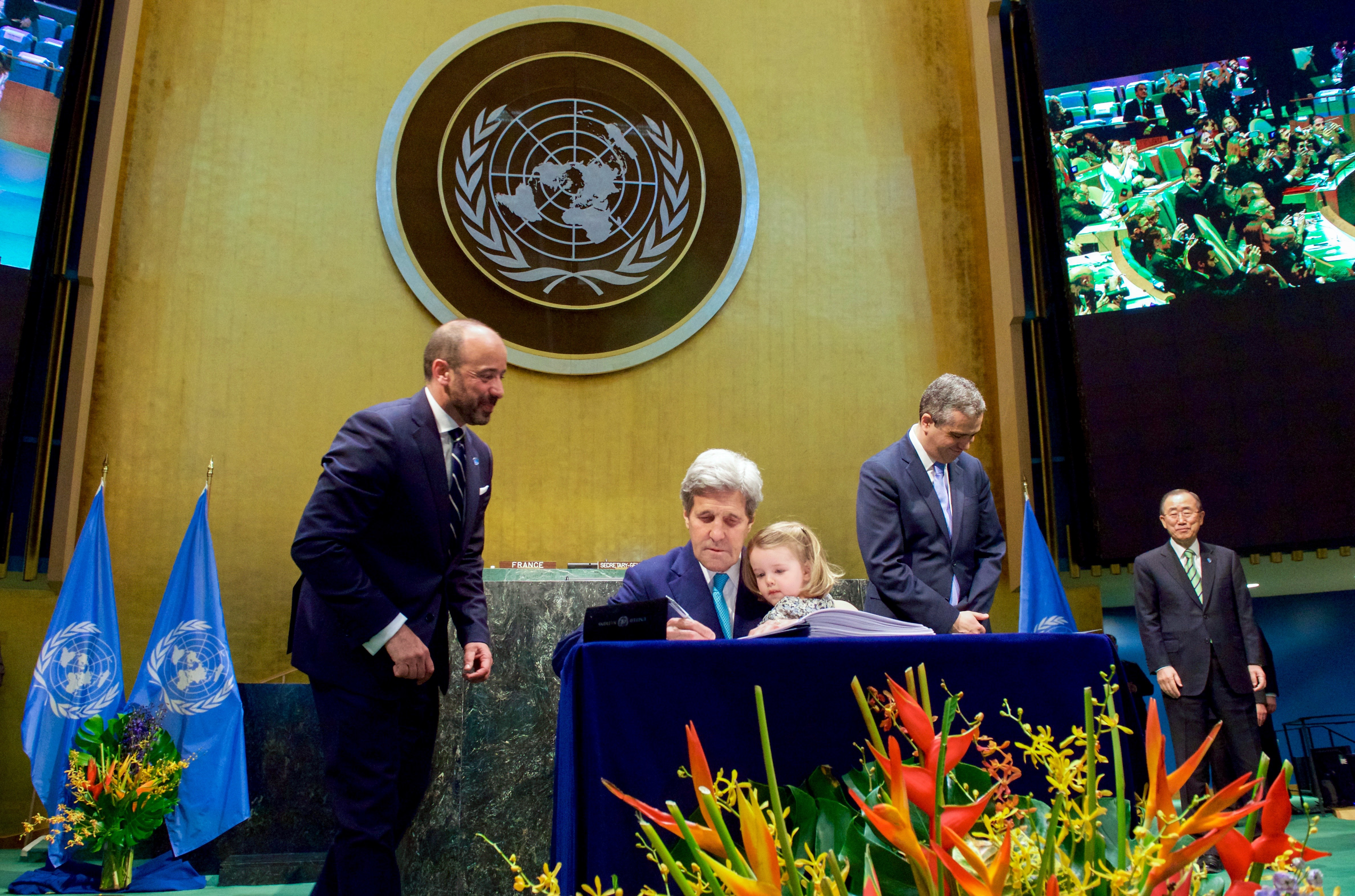
Signing by John Kerry in United Nations General Assembly Hall for the United States

The agreement would enter into force (and thus become fully effective) if 55 countries that produce at least 55% of the world's greenhouse gas emissions (according to a list produced in 2015) ratify or otherwise join the treaty. Alternative ways to join the treaty are acceptance, approval or accession. The first two are typically used when a head of state is not necessary to bind a country to a treaty, whereas the latter typically happens when a country joins a treaty already in force. After ratification by the European Union, the agreement obtained enough parties to enter into effect on 4 November 2016.

Both the EU and its member states are individually responsible for ratifying the Paris Agreement. A strong preference was reported that the EU and its 28 member states ratify at the same time to ensure that they do not engage themselves to fulfilling obligations that strictly belong to the other, and there were fears by observers that disagreement over each member state's share of the EU-wide reduction target, as well as Britain's vote to leave the EU might delay the Paris pact. However, the EU deposited its instruments of ratification on 5 October 2016, along with seven EU member states.

== Parties ==
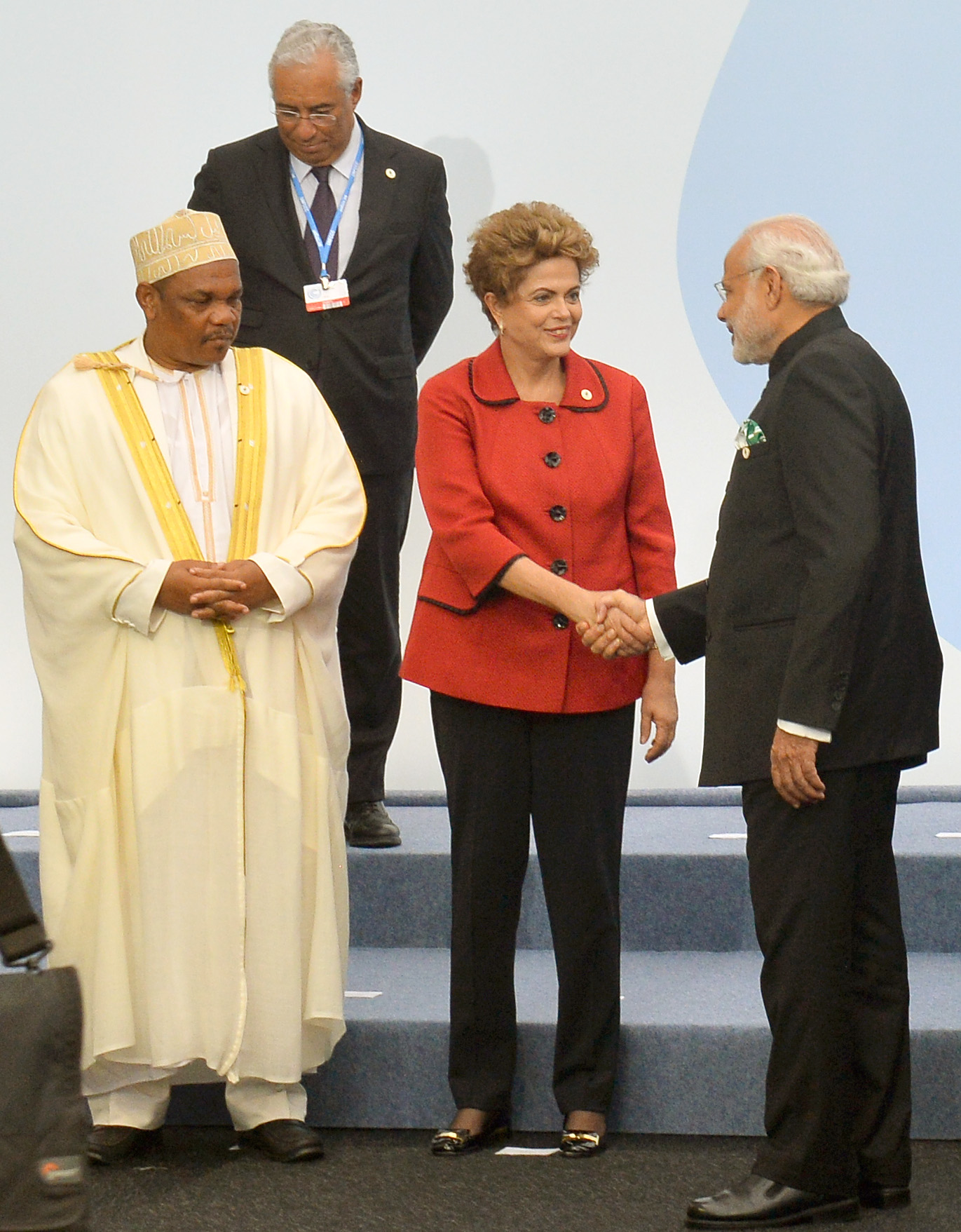
The Indian prime minister, Narendra Modi greeting the president of Brazil, Dilma Rousseff, in background Portuguese prime minister António Costa at the COP21 Summit on 30 November 2015

=== Countries that have ratified or acceded ===
The EU and 194 states, totalling over 98% of greenhouse gas emissions, have ratified or acceded to the agreement. The only countries which have not ratified are some greenhouse gas emitters in the Middle East: Iran with 2% of the world total being the largest. Libya and Yemen have also not ratified the agreement. Eritrea is the latest country to ratify the agreement, on 7 February 2023.

Article 28 enables parties to withdraw from the agreement after sending a withdrawal notification to the depositary. Notice can be given no earlier than three years after the agreement goes into force for the country. Withdrawal is effective one year after the depositary is notified.

=== United States withdrawal, readmittance, and rewithdrawal ===
On 4 August 2017, the Trump administration delivered an official notice to the United Nations that the United States intended to withdraw from the Paris Agreement as soon as it was eligible to do so. The notice of withdrawal could not be submitted until the agreement was in force for three years for the US, on 4 November 2019. The US government deposited the notification with the secretary-general of the United Nations and officially withdrew one year later on 4 November 2020.

President Joe Biden signed an executive order on his first day in office, 20 January 2021, to re-admit the United States into the Paris Agreement. Following the 30-day period set by Article 21.3, the US was readmitted to the agreement. United States climate envoy John Kerry took part in virtual events, saying that the US would "earn its way back" into legitimacy in the Paris process. United Nations secretary-general António Guterres welcomed the return of the United States as restoring the "missing link that weakened the whole".

On 20 January 2025, President Donald Trump signed an executive order again withdrawing the US from the agreement. The withdrawal went into effect on 27 January 2026.

== Content ==
=== Structure ===
The Paris Agreement is a short agreement with 16 introductory paragraphs and 29 articles. It contains procedural articles (covering, for example, the criteria for its entry into force) and operational articles (covering, for example, mitigation, adaptation and finance). It is a binding agreement, but many of its articles do not imply obligations or are there to facilitate international collaboration. It covers most greenhouse gas emissions, but does not apply to international aviation and shipping, which fall under the responsibility of the International Civil Aviation Organization and the International Maritime Organization, respectively.

The Paris Agreement has been described as having a bottom-up structure, as its core pledge and review mechanism allows nations to set their own nationally determined contributions (NDCs), rather than having targets imposed top down. Unlike its predecessor, the Kyoto Protocol, which sets commitment targets that have legal force, the Paris Agreement, with its emphasis on consensus building, allows for voluntary and nationally determined targets. The specific climate goals are thus politically encouraged, rather than legally bound. Only the processes governing the reporting and review of these goals are mandated under international law. This structure is especially notable for the United States – because there are no legal mitigation or finance targets, the agreement is considered an "executive agreement rather than a treaty". Because the UNFCCC treaty of 1992 received the consent of the US Senate, this new agreement does not require further legislation.

Another key difference between the Paris Agreement and the Kyoto Protocol is their scope. The Kyoto Protocol differentiated between Annex-I, richer countries with a historical responsibility for climate change, and non-Annex-I countries, but this division is blurred in the Paris Agreement as all parties are required to submit emissions reduction plans. The Paris Agreement still emphasizes the principle of Common but Differentiated Responsibility and Respective Capabilities – the acknowledgement that different nations have different capacities and duties to climate action – but it does not provide a specific division between developed and developing nations.

=== Nationally determined contributions ===
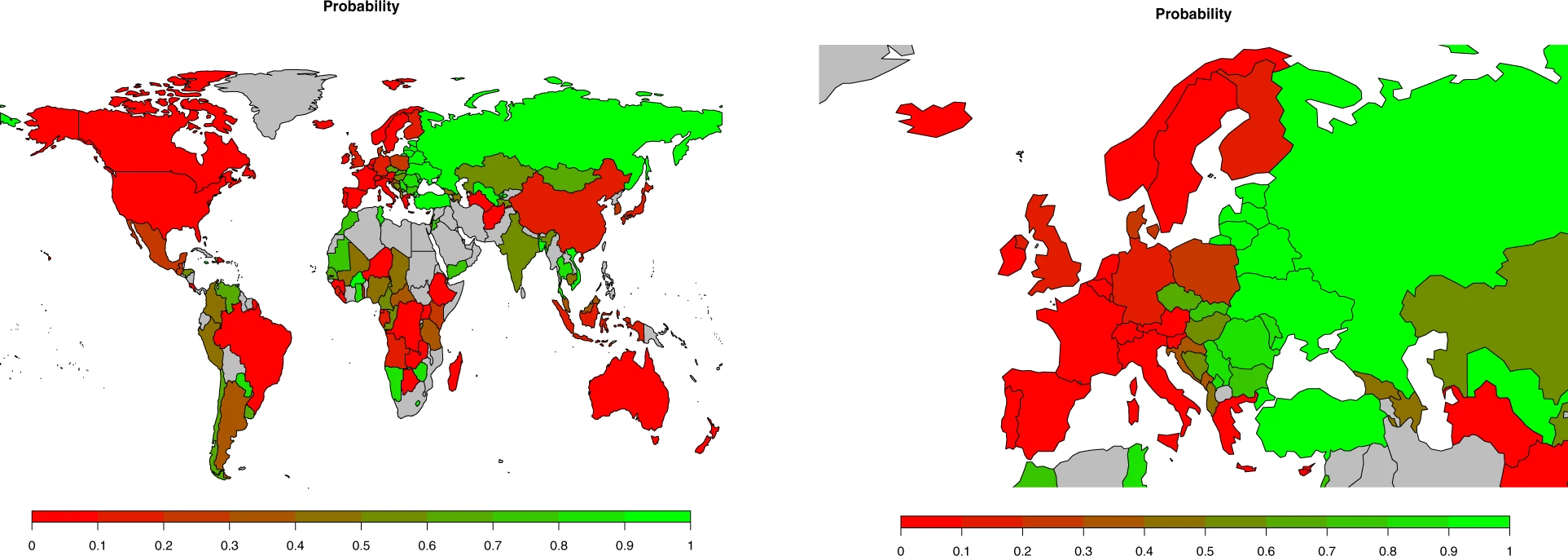
Probability that countries achieve their Paris Agreement Goals according to their nationally determined contributions as of 2021 (NDCs)

Countries determine themselves what contributions they should make to achieve the aims of the treaty. As such, these plans are called nationally determined contributions (NDCs). Article 3 requires NDCs to be "ambitious efforts" towards "achieving the purpose of this Agreement" and to "represent a progression over time". The contributions should be set every five years and are to be registered by the UNFCCC Secretariat. Each further ambition should be more ambitious than the previous one, known as the principle of progression. Countries can cooperate and pool their nationally determined contributions. The Intended Nationally Determined Contributions pledged during the 2015 Climate Change Conference are converted to NDCs when a country ratifies the Paris Agreement, unless they submit an update.

The Paris Agreement does not prescribe the exact nature of the NDCs. At a minimum, they should contain mitigation provisions, but they may also contain pledges on adaptation, finance, technology transfer, capacity building and transparency. Some of the pledges in the NDCs are unconditional, but others are conditional on outside factors such as getting finance and technical support, the ambition from other parties or the details of rules of the Paris Agreement that are yet to be set. Most NDCs have a conditional component.

While the NDCs themselves are not binding, the procedures surrounding them are. These procedures include the obligation to prepare, communicate and maintain successive NDCs, set a new one every five years, and provide information about the implementation. There is no mechanism to force a country to set a NDC target by a specific date, nor to meet their targets. There will be only a name and shame system or as János Pásztor, the former U.N. assistant secretary-general on climate change, stated, a "name and encourage" plan.

=== Global stocktake ===
Greenhouse gas emissions per person in the highest-emitting countries. Though China has the greatest total annual carbon dioxide emissions, the U.S. and a few other high-emitting countries exceed China in per capita emissions.

Share of global carbon dioxide emissions, total for each country without regard to population size

Under the Paris Agreement, countries must increase their ambition every five years. To facilitate this, the agreement established the Global Stocktake, which assesses progress, with the first evaluation in 2023. The outcome is to be used as input for new nationally determined contributions of parties. The Talanoa Dialogue in 2018 was seen as an example for the global stocktake. After a year of discussion, a report was published and there was a call for action, but countries did not increase ambition afterwards.

The stocktake works as part of the Paris Agreement's effort to create a "ratcheting up" of ambition in emissions cuts. Because analysts agreed in 2014 that the NDCs would not limit rising temperatures below 2 °C, the global stocktake reconvenes parties to assess how their new NDCs must evolve so that they continually reflect a country's "highest possible ambition". While ratcheting up the ambition of NDCs is a major aim of the global stocktake, it assesses efforts beyond mitigation. The five-year reviews will also evaluate adaptation, climate finance provisions, and technology development and transfer.

On 30 November 2023, the United Nations Climate Change Conference (COP28) commenced in Dubai with renewed calls for amplified efforts towards climate action.

=== Mitigation provisions and carbon markets ===
Article 6 has been flagged as containing some of the key provisions of the Paris Agreement. Broadly, it outlines the cooperative approaches that parties can take in achieving their nationally determined carbon emissions reductions. In doing so, it helps establish the Paris Agreement as a framework for a global carbon market. Article 6 is the only important part of the agreement yet to be resolved; negotiations in 2019 did not produce a result. The topic was settled during the 2021 COP26 in Glasgow. A mechanism, the "corresponding adjustment", was established to avoid double counting for emission offsets.

==== Linkage of carbon trading systems and ITMOs ====
Paragraphs 6.2 and 6.3 establish a framework to govern the international transfer of mitigation outcomes (ITMOs). The agreement recognizes the rights of parties to use emissions reductions outside of their own borders toward their NDC, in a system of carbon accounting and trading. This provision requires the "linkage" of carbon emissions trading systems – because measured emissions reductions must avoid "double counting", transferred mitigation outcomes must be recorded as a gain of emission units for one party and a reduction of emission units for the other, a so-called "corresponding adjustment". Because the NDCs, and domestic carbon trading schemes, are heterogeneous, the ITMOs will provide a format for global linkage under the auspices of the UNFCCC. The provision thus also creates a pressure for countries to adopt emissions management systems – if a country wants to use more cost-effective cooperative approaches to achieve their NDCs, they will have to monitor carbon units for their economies.

So far, as the only country who wants to buy ITMOs, Switzerland has signed deals regarding ITMO tradings with Peru, Ghana, Senegal, Georgia, Dominica, Vanuatu, Thailand and Ukraine.

Country	Sign date	Source
Peru	20 October 2020	
Ghana	23 November 2020	
Senegal	6 July 2021	
Georgia	18 October 2021	
Dominica	11 November 2021	
Vanuatu	11 November 2021	
Thailand	24 June 2022	
Ukraine	4 July 2022	

==== Sustainable Development Mechanism ====
Paragraphs 6.4–6.7 establish a mechanism "to contribute to the mitigation of greenhouse gases and support sustainable development". Though there is no official name for the mechanism as yet, it has been referred to as the Sustainable Development Mechanism or SDM. The SDM is considered to be the successor to the Clean Development Mechanism, a mechanism under the Kyoto Protocol by which parties could collaboratively pursue emissions reductions.

The SDM is set to largely resemble the Clean Development Mechanism, with the dual goal of contributing to global GHG emissions reductions and supporting sustainable development. Though the structure and processes governing the SDM are not yet determined, certain similarities and differences from the Clean Development Mechanisms have become clear. A key difference is that the SDM will be available to all parties as opposed to only Annex-I parties, making it much wider in scope.

The Clean Development Mechanism of the Kyoto Protocol was criticized for failing to produce either meaningful emissions reductions or sustainable development benefits in most instances. and for its complexity. It is possible that the SDM will see difficulties.

=== Climate change adaptation provisions ===
Climate change adaptation received more focus in Paris negotiations than in previous climate treaties. Collective, long-term adaptation goals are included in the agreement, and countries must report on their adaptation actions, making it a parallel component with mitigation. The adaptation goals focus on enhancing adaptive capacity, increasing resilience, and limiting vulnerability.

== Implementation ==
The Paris Agreement is implemented via national policy. It would involve improvements to energy efficiency to decrease the energy intensity of the global economy. Implementation also requires fossil fuel burning to be cut back and the share of sustainable energy to grow rapidly. Emissions are being reduced rapidly in the electricity sector, but not in the building, transport and heating sector. Some industries are difficult to decarbonize, and for those carbon dioxide removal may be necessary to achieve net zero emissions. In a report released in 2022 the IPCC promotes the need for innovation and technological changes in combination with consumption and production behavioral changes to meet Paris Agreement objectives.

To stay below 1.5 °C of global warming, emissions need to be cut by roughly 50% by 2030. This is an aggregate of each country's nationally determined contributions. By mid-century, CO_{2} emissions would need to be cut to zero, and total greenhouse gases would need to be net zero just after mid-century.

There are barriers to implementing the agreement. Some countries struggle to attract the finance necessary for investments in decarbonization. Climate finance is fragmented, further complicating investments. Another issue is the lack of capabilities in government and other institutions to implement policy. Clean technology and knowledge is often not transferred to countries or places that need it. In December 2020, the former chair of the COP 21, Laurent Fabius, argued that the implementation of the Paris Agreement could be bolstered by the adoption of a Global Pact for the Environment. The latter would define the environmental rights and duties of states, individuals and businesses.

== Specific topics of concern ==
=== Effectiveness ===
Scenarios of global greenhouse gas emissions as of 2022. If all countries achieve their current Paris Agreement pledges, average warming by 2100 would still exceed the maximum 2°C target set by the agreement.

The effectiveness of the Paris Agreement to reach its climate goals is under debate, with most experts saying it is insufficient for its more ambitious goal of keeping global temperature rise under 1.5 °C. Many of the exact provisions of the Paris Agreement have yet to be straightened out, so that it may be too early to judge effectiveness. According to the 2020 United Nations Environment Programme (UNEP), with the current climate commitments of the Paris Agreement, global mean temperatures will likely rise by more than 3 °C by the end of the 21st century. Newer net zero commitments were not included in the Nationally Determined Contributions, and may bring down temperatures by a further 0.5 °C.

With initial pledges by countries inadequate, faster and more expensive future mitigation would be needed to still reach the targets. Furthermore, there is a gap between pledges by countries in their NDCs and implementation of these pledges; one third of the emission gap between the lowest-costs and actual reductions in emissions would be closed by implementing existing pledges. A pair of studies in Nature found that as of 2017 none of the major industrialized nations were implementing the policies they had pledged, and none met their pledged emission reduction targets, and even if they had, the sum of all member pledges (as of 2016) would not keep global temperature rise "well below 2°C".

In 2021, a study using a probabilistic model concluded that the rates of emissions reductions would have to increase by 80% beyond NDCs to likely meet the 2 °C upper target of the Paris Agreement, that the probabilities of major emitters meeting their NDCs without such an increase is very low. It estimated that with current trends the probability of staying below 2 °C of warming is 5–26% if NDCs were met and continued post-2030 by all signatories.

As of 2020, there is little scientific literature on the topics of the effectiveness of the Paris Agreement on capacity building and adaptation, even though they feature prominently in the Paris Agreement. The literature available is mostly mixed in its conclusions about loss and damage, and adaptation.

According to the stocktake report, the agreement has a significant effect: while in 2010 the expected temperature rise by 2100 was 3.7–4.8 °C, at COP 27 it was 2.4–2.6 °C and if all countries will fulfill their long-term pledges even 1.7–2.1 °C. Despite it, the world is still very far from reaching the aim of the agreement: limiting temperature rise to 1.5 degrees. For doing this, emissions must peak by 2025. Recent work – on the basis of the first single calendar year in 2024 with an average temperature above 1.5 degrees Celsius – indicates that most probably Earth has already entered the 20-year period that will reach an average warming of 1.5 degrees Celsius. Furthermore, it has been suggested that the global mean temperature may have already passed the 1.5 degrees Celsius level in 2024.

The Paris Agreement also seemed to have influenced the focus of the following IPCC reports. Before the Paris Agreement was settled, the IPCC assessment reports focused roughly in equal proportions on temperatures above and below 2 °C. However, in the 6th assessment report, after the Paris Engagement was reached, slightly less than 20% of the temperature mentions are above 2 °C and almost 50% focus on 1.5 °C alone.

=== Fulfillment of requirements ===
Since 2000, rising CO_{2} emissions in China and the rest of the world have surpassed the output of the United States and Europe.

Per person, the United States generates CO_{2} at a far faster rate than other primary regions.

In September 2021, the Climate Action Tracker estimated that, with current policies, global emissions will double above the 2030 target level. The gap is 20–23 Gt CO2e. Countries such as Iran, Russia, Saudi Arabia, Singapore, and Thailand have been criticised of not doing enough to meet the requirements of the agreement, and are on track to achieve a 4 °C warming of the planet if current policies are implemented more widely. Of the world's countries, only the Gambia's emissions are at the level required by the Paris Agreement. Models predicted that if the necessary measures were not implemented by autumn 2021, the global average temperature would rise by 2.9 °C. With the implementation of the Paris Agreement pledges, the average temperature would rise by 2.4 °C, and with every zero emission target reached, the average temperature would rise by 2.0 °C.

The Production Gap 2021 report states that world governments still plan to produce 110% more fossil fuels in 2030 (including 240% more coal, 57% more oil and 71% more gas) than the 1.5 degree limit.

In September 2023 the first global stocktake report about the implementation of the agreement was released. According to the report contrarily to expectations, the agreement has a significant effect: while in 2010 the expected temperature rise by 2100 was 3.7–4.8 °C, at COP 27 it was 2.4–2.6 °C and if all countries will fulfill their long-term pledges 1.7–2.1 °C. However, the world remains very far from limiting warming to 1.5 degrees. To meet this benchmark, global emissions must peak by 2025, and although emissions have peaked in some countries, global emissions have not. In 2025, the Copernicus Climate Change Service reported that 2024 was the first year to exceed the 1.5°C threshold.

=== Ensuring finance ===
Pledges to the Green Climate Fund in 2018. The numbers represent the signed pledges per year.

Developed countries reaffirmed the commitment to mobilize $100 billion a year in climate finance by 2020, and agreed to continue mobilising finance at this level until 2025. The money is for supporting mitigation and adaptation in developing countries. It includes finance for the Green Climate Fund, which is a part of the UNFCCC, but also for a variety of other public and private pledges. The Paris Agreement states that a new commitment of at least $100 billion per year has to be agreed before 2025.

Though both mitigation and adaptation require increased climate financing, adaptation has typically received lower levels of support and has mobilized less action from the private sector. A report by the OECD found that 16% of global climate finance was directed toward climate adaptation in 2013–2014, compared to 77% for mitigation. The Paris Agreement called for a balance of climate finance between adaptation and mitigation, and specifically increasing adaptation support for parties most vulnerable to the effects of climate change, including Least developed countries and Small Island Developing States. The agreement also reminds parties of the importance of public grants, because adaptation measures receive less investment from the public sector.

In 2015, twenty multilateral development banks (MDBs) and members of the International Development Finance Club introduced five principles to maintain widespread climate action in their investments: commitment to climate strategies, managing climate risks, promoting climate smart objectives, improving climate performance and accounting for their own actions. As of January 2020, the number of members abiding by these principles grew to 44.

Some specific outcomes of the elevated attention to adaptation financing in Paris include the G7 countries' announcement to provide US$420 million for climate risk insurance, and the launching of a Climate Risk and Early Warning Systems (CREWS) Initiative. The largest donors to multilateral climate funds, which includes the Green Climate Fund, are the United States, the United Kingdom, Japan, Germany, France and Sweden.

=== Loss and damage ===
It is not possible to adapt to all effects of climate change: even in the case of optimal adaptation, severe damage may still occur. The Paris Agreement recognizes loss and damage of this kind. Loss and damage can stem from extreme weather events, or from slow-onset events such as the loss of land to sea level rise for low-lying islands. Previous climate agreements classified loss and damage as a subset of adaptation.

The push to address loss and damage as a distinct issue in the Paris Agreement came from the Alliance of Small Island States and the Least Developed Countries, whose economies and livelihoods are most vulnerable to the negative effects of climate change. The Warsaw Mechanism, established two years earlier during COP19 and set to expire in 2016, categorizes loss and damage as a subset of adaptation, which was unpopular with many countries. It is recognized as a separate pillar of the Paris Agreement. The United States argued against this, possibly worried that classifying the issue as separate from adaptation would create yet another climate finance provision. In the end, the agreement calls for "averting, minimizing, and addressing loss and damage" but specifies that it cannot be used as the basis for liability. The agreement adopts the Warsaw Mechanism, an institution that will attempt to address questions about how to classify, address, and share responsibility for loss.

=== Transparency ===
The parties are legally bound to have their progress tracked by technical expert review to assess achievement toward the NDC and to determine ways to strengthen ambition. Article 13 of the Paris Agreement articulates an "enhanced transparency framework for action and support" that establishes harmonized monitoring, reporting, and verification (MRV) requirements. Both developed and developing nations must report every two years on their mitigation efforts, and all parties will be subject to technical and peer review.

While the enhanced transparency framework is universal, the framework is meant to provide "built-in flexibility" to distinguish between developed and developing countries' capacities. The Paris Agreement has provisions for an enhanced framework for capacity building, recognizes the varying circumstances of countries, and notes that the technical expert review for each country consider that country's specific capacity for reporting. Parties to the agreement send their first Biennial Transparency Report (BTR), and greenhouse gas inventory figures to the UNFCCC by 2024 and every two years after that. Developed countries submit their first BTR in 2022 and inventories annually from that year. The agreement also develops a Capacity-Building Initiative for Transparency to assist developing countries in building the necessary institutions and processes for compliance.

Flexibility can be incorporated into the enhanced transparency framework via the scope, level of detail, or frequency of reporting, tiered based on a country's capacity. The requirement for in-country technical reviews could be lifted for some less developed or small island developing countries. Ways to assess capacity include financial and human resources in a country necessary for NDC review.

=== Litigation ===
The Paris Agreement has become a focal point of climate change litigation. One of the first major cases in this area was State of the Netherlands v. Urgenda Foundation, which was raised against the Netherlands' government after it had reduced its planned emissions reductions goal for 2030 prior to the Paris Agreement. After an initial ruling against the government in 2015 that required it to maintain its planned reduction, the decision was upheld on appeals through the Supreme Court of the Netherlands in 2019, ruling that the Dutch government failed to uphold human rights under Dutch law and the European Convention on Human Rights by lowering its emission targets. The 2 °C temperature target of the Paris Agreement provided part of the judgement's legal basis. The agreement, whose goals are enshrined in German law, also formed part of the argumentation in Neubauer et al. v. Germany, where the court ordered Germany to reconsider its climate targets.

In May 2021, the district court of The Hague ruled against oil company Royal Dutch Shell in Milieudefensie et al v Royal Dutch Shell. The court ruled that it must cut its global emissions by 45% from 2019 levels by 2030, as it was in violation of human rights. This lawsuit was considered the first major application of the Paris Agreement towards a corporation.

=== Human rights ===
On 4 July 2022, the Supreme Federal Court of Brazil recognized the Paris Agreement as a "human rights treaty". According to the ruling of the court in Brazil it should "supersede national law". In the same month the United Nations Human Rights Council in a resolution "(A/HRC/50/L.10/Rev.1) on Human rights and climate change, adopted without a vote" called to ratify and implement the agreement and emphasized the link between stopping climate change and the right to food.

The Office of the United Nations High Commissioner for Human Rights officially recognized that "Climate change threatens the effective enjoyment of a range of human rights including those to life, water and sanitation, food, health, housing, self-determination, culture and development."

== Reception ==
The agreement was lauded by French president François Hollande, UN secretary-general Ban Ki-moon and Christiana Figueres, Executive Secretary of the UNFCCC. The president of Brazil, Dilma Rousseff, called the agreement "balanced and long-lasting", and India's prime minister Narendra Modi commended the agreement's climate justice. When the agreement achieved the required signatures in October 2016, US president Barack Obama said that "Even if we meet every target, we will only get to part of where we need to go." He also stated "this agreement will help delay or avoid some of the worst consequences of climate change [and] will help other nations ratchet down their emissions over time."

Some environmentalists and analysts reacted cautiously, acknowledging the "spirit of Paris" in bringing together countries, but expressing less optimism about the pace of climate mitigation and how much the agreement could do for poorer countries. James Hansen, a former NASA scientist and leading climate change expert, voiced anger that most of the agreement consists of "promises" or aims and not firm commitments and called the Paris talks a fraud with "no action, just promises". Criticism of the agreement from those arguing against climate action has been diffuse, which may be due to the weakness of the agreement. This type of criticism typically focuses on national sovereignty and ineffectiveness of international action.

== Precise methodology and status of goal ==
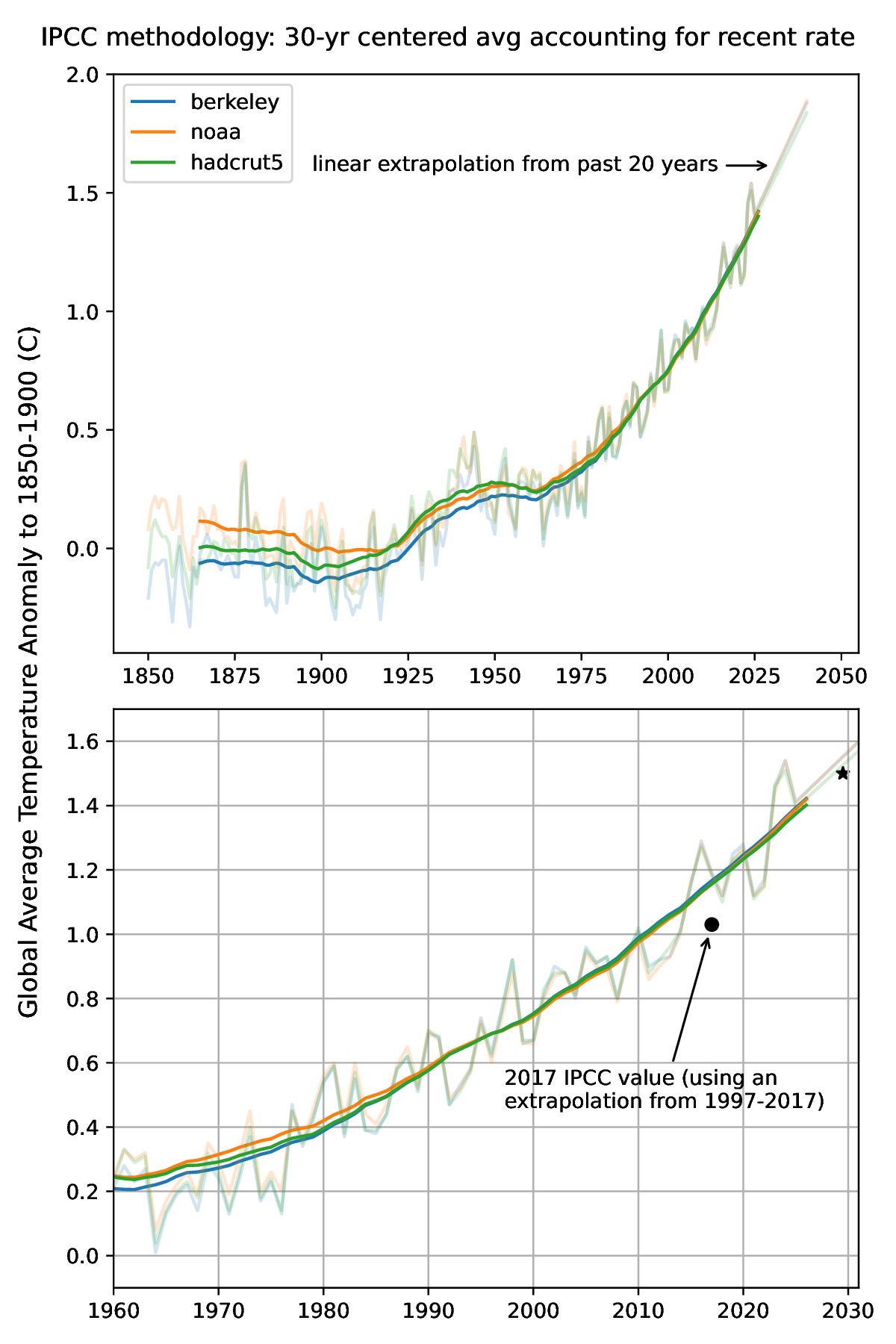
Calculation of the 30-year average of the global temperature anomaly (referenced to 1850–1900). Linear extrapolation from the past 20 years fills the averaging window for the most recent dates. (Data from the MetOffice Climate Dashboard)

The Paris Agreement required countries to pursue efforts to "limit the temperature increase to 1.5°C above pre-industrial levels", but did not give a precise definition for the temperature increase. In a 2018 special report titled "Global Warming of 1.5°C", the IPCC provided that standard:

This IPCC Special Report on Global Warming of 1.5°C uses the reference period 1850–1900 to represent pre-industrial temperature ... warming is defined as the increase in the 30-year global average of combined air temperature over land and water temperature at the ocean surface.

This is implemented as a 30-year centered average of the annual global temperature anomaly, referenced to the 1850–1900 average temperature. For the most recent 15 years, the averaging window is filled using a linear extrapolation from recent years (although the number of "recent" years was not specified by the IPCC). Using this methodology, the 2017 30-year average was found to be about 1.03 °C, and the predicted date of crossing the 1.5 °C level was the year 2040.

As of 2024, the same methodology predicts the 1.5 °C level will occur sometime in 2029. This itself could be optimistically distant, as the recent decade of warming since 2017 shows that the original IPCC average for that year was underestimated by about 0.1 °C.

== See also ==
- Climate change denial – Denial of the scientific consensus on climate change
- Climate justice – Concept for social justice in climate change context
- Climate target – Policy for emissions reductions
- Kigali Amendment – International agreement (2016) to reduce the use of hydrofluorocarbons
- Politics of climate change – Interaction of societies and governments with current climate change
- Green New Deal – Proposed economic stimulus program
