= Global stocktake =

Regular report pursuant to the Paris Agreement

The Global Stocktake (GST) is a fundamental component of the Paris Agreement which is used to monitor its implementation and evaluate the collective progress made in achieving the agreed goals. The Global Stocktake thus links implementation of nationally determined contributions (NDCs) with the overarching goals of the Paris Agreement, and has the ultimate aim of raising climate ambition.

== Background ==
The Paris Agreement marked a turning point in international climate policy. Binding under international law and global in scope, it not only sets out ambitious global goals, such as limiting the rise in average global temperature to well below 2 °C compared with pre-industrial levels, but also introduces an innovative architecture that gives Parties considerable leeway in setting their own climate change targets. In contrast to common practice under international environmental law, states' individual contributions are not negotiated at international level and achievement of set targets is not binding. To ensure that the targets are implemented nonetheless, international-level review and transparency mechanisms have been made integral to the Agreement.

== Role as part of the Paris regime ==
The Paris Agreement requires its signatory states (known as Parties) to regularly formulate their own climate action plans, so-called nationally determined contributions (NDCs), and to implement measures that help them achieve their climate action goals. There is, however, no obligation under international law for Parties to achieve their NDCs.

Parties are, however, required to regularly report on their progress in implementing their NDCs and the reports are subject to international peer review. In addition to this Enhanced Transparency Framework, the Paris Agreement stipulates that Parties must regularly update their NDCs, that the updated NDCs must not fall short of the targets applicable prior to the update and that they should reflect the highest possible level of ambition. In addition, a Global Stocktake is carried out once every five years to assess the collective progress made towards achieving the long-term goals. The outcomes of the stocktake are to be taken into account when developing nationally determined contributions. The Global Stocktake is thus a fundamental component of the Paris Agreement in that it regularly takes stock of progress made and provides a basis for use in updating Parties' NDCs.

== Role in raising ambition ==
The Global Stocktake is designed to raise ambition by helping Parties to:

1. See what they have achieved so far in implementing their NDCs.
2. Identify what still needs to be done to achieve their NDC targets.
3. Identify the approaches that can be taken to enhance their own efforts at national and international level.

In this way, it is hoped that the Global Stocktake will become a driver of ambition. However, the Global Stocktake takes a collective rather than an individual approach. This means that individual countries are not singled out and the outcomes of the stocktaking process should not allow conclusions to be drawn about the state of implementation in individual states.

== Scope ==
The question of whether the Global Stocktake should be limited to mitigation or should also include other aspects such as adaptation and the provision of climate finance has been the subject of controversial debate. In the run-up to the Climate Change Conference in Paris, however, the view prevailed that the Global Stocktake should take in all three. As part of the Global Stocktake, Article 14 of the Paris Agreement lists adaptation and the means of implementation and support.

== Three-phase Global Stocktake ==
The modalities for implementation agreed at the Climate Change Conference in Katowice provide for three stocktake phases:

=== Phase 1: Information collection and preparation ===
Phase 1 involves collecting and preparing information needed to conduct the stocktake. Information is taken from various sources. In addition to Parties' nationally determined contributions (NDCs) and the associated reports submitted under the Paris Agreement, the most recent scientific findings of the Intergovernmental Panel on Climate Change (IPCC) as well as inputs from non-governmental stakeholders and observer organisations are also used. The information gathered is published in the public domain and also collated in the form of synthesis reports. Individual reports are also prepared on various focus topics – mitigation, adaptation, means of implementation, and cross-cutting issues – and on issues such as the status of global greenhouse gas emissions, the overall contribution made by NDCs and the status concerning action taken to adapt to climate change.

=== Phase 2: Technical assessment of information ===
In Phase 2, the information is assessed for collective progress in implementing the Paris Agreement and its long-term goals. This sees various stakeholders entering into a series of technical dialogues to discuss the information gathered in Phase 1. Phase 2 is also used to highlight the opportunities to strengthen and enhance response measures in dealing with climate change. The results are documented in a series of reports, including summary reports of each technical dialogue and the final synthesis report. The synthesis report was published in 2023 before COP28.

=== Phase 3: Political messages derived from the technical assessment ===
In Phase 3, the outcomes of the assessment flow into the policy process. The aim here is to support Parties to the Paris Agreement in enhancing both their climate change policies and the action they take to support other Parties. The outcomes are also used to promote international cooperation. On this point, it is unclear as to how the outcomes are to be documented – perhaps a political declaration or even a formal decision by the Conference of the Parties.

== The first Global Stocktake ==
=== Process ===
The first Global Stocktake was presented at COP 28 in Dubai at the end of 2023. Since the obligation to report on national emissions (the Enhanced Transparency Framework) did not take effect until 2024, the reports submitted by the countries varied greatly in their level of detail. The resulting information gaps had to be filled, for example, by analyses and recommendations from non-state actors - such as civil society initiatives, companies, or cities.

Over the course of two years, the technical dialogue compiled reports and submissions from countries, international organizations, and more than 137 organizations not directly party to the treaty. In total, over 170,000 pages of material were submitted. This resulted in the synthesis report on national climate plans, which identified 17 key findings in September 2023 and was intended to serve as the basis for the political implementation phase.

It was already clear from this report that the measures pledged to date were insufficient to achieve the goals of the Paris Agreement. Furthermore, even these inadequate measures were not sufficiently implemented: As of 2015, the global average temperature was still expected to rise by 3 to 3.2 degrees Celsius by the year 2100. If all pledged measures had been implemented, this increase would have been limited to 1.7 to 2.1 degrees Celsius. However, due to inadequate implementation, the projected temperature increase was 2.6 to 2.7 degrees Celsius. Instead of the necessary 43 percent reduction in greenhouse gas emissions by 2030 compared to the 1990 baseline, only a 5 percent reduction was expected. Likewise, the pledged sum of 100 billion U.S. dollars per year to support developing countries in climate protection and climate adaptation was not reached until 2022, rather than 2020.

Shortly before the conference began, it had become known that the host country, the United Arab Emirates, intended to use the conference to conclude new supply contracts for fossil fuels. In response, representatives from China and the U.S. emphasized the importance of this year’s conference outcomes, and its chair, Sultan Al Jaber, highlighted in his opening remarks the goal of limiting global temperature rise to 1.5 degrees above pre-industrial levels. A plan to transition away from fossil fuels had been endorsed prior to the conference by 106 countries from the EU, Africa, and various island nations, and gained at least 21 additional signatories during the conference. The OPEC countries, in particular, resisted including this goal in the final report, resulting in nearly 160 possible formulations being discussed two days before the conference ended. However, following harsh criticism from the World Resources Institute, the governments of Germany, the U.S., the UK, Bangladesh, and Colombia, the EU, the International Energy Agency, COP 26 President Alok Sharma, and the Alliance of Small Island States, this goal was ultimately included.

On December 13, 2023, the political agreement on the first stocktake was finally adopted as part of the UAE Consensus. Since then, there have been several follow-up processes. For example, the annual Global Stocktake Dialogue has been held three times to promote the exchange of knowledge and experiences regarding how the results of the first Global Stocktake have influenced the development of the nationally determined contributions (NDCs).

=== Outcome ===
Despite criticism of vague wording and inadequate financial support for developing countries, the resolution on the 2023 Global Stocktake includes quantifiable targets to be achieved by 2030. These include tripling the generation capacity of renewable energy sources and doubling global energy efficiency by 2030; methane emissions are also to be substantially reduced. For the first time in the history of UN climate conferences, the document also calls on all countries to transition away from fossil fuels in order to achieve climate neutrality by 2050. Specifically, it called for an acceleration of the phase-out of coal. It also established, among other things, the implementation procedures for the fund for responding to loss and damage, the creation of which had been decided at the conference the previous year. The fund was endowed with $700 million in start-up capital and is to be administered by the World Bank. However, no agreement was reached on the establishment of a carbon market under Article 6 of the Paris Agreement.

== Outlook ==
The third versions of the nationally determined contributions (NDCs) should have been submitted by February 2025 at the latest so that they could be discussed and evaluated at COP 30 in Belém, Brazil, in November 2025. These plans should have incorporated the findings of the 2023 Global Stocktake. The synthesis report on national climate plans, published annually by the UN, showed in 2025 that 88% of countries had taken the results of the Global Stocktake into account when drafting their NDCs.

The second Global Stocktake will begin in November 2026 at COP 31 in Antalya, Turkey, and will be concluded two years later at COP 33.

== See also ==
- Pledge and review
