= Pledge and review =

Method for international action against climate change

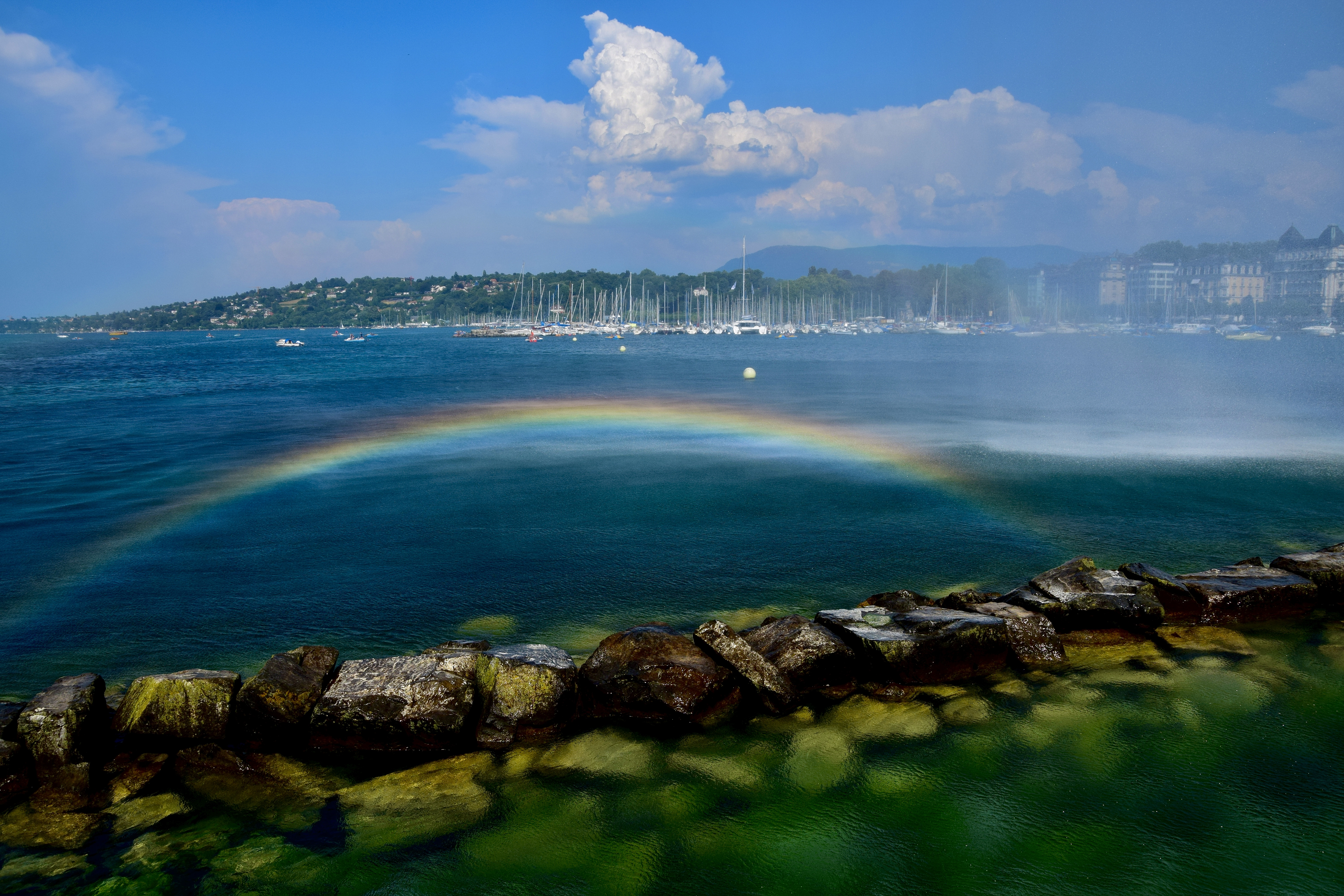
Lake Geneva with the city in the background. The pledge-and-review approach was first introduced at 1991 talks that occurred in Geneva, to prepare the way for the UNFCCC.

Pledge and review is a method for facilitating international action against climate change. It involves nations each making a self-determined pledge relating to actions they expect to take in response to global warming, which they submit to the United Nations. Some time after the pledges have been submitted, there is a review process where nations assess each other's progress towards meeting the pledges. Then a further round of enhanced pledges can be made, and the process can further iterate.

Pledge and review is sometimes referred to as a bargaining approach; when nations first announce their pledges they may not be set in stone. A nation might strengthen its pledge in response to pledges by its competitors, which can encourage it to increase its climate ambition if it feels it can do so without losing ground to trading rivals. Additionally, sometimes a nation that feels especially threatened by climate change can make non-climate related concessions to a trading partner, in return for them making a stronger pledge. The main way to increase pledges, however, is when the process iterates after the review phase. Each subsequent round of pledges is supposed to involve an increased level of commitment to combat climate change. Hence the ratcheting up metaphor is often used, as the strengthening of pledges is supposed to be a one-way process.

Pledge-and-review was introduced as a possible way to facilitate global action on climate change in 1991, yet it was little used in the early 1990s. In 1995, it was rejected by the international community, who instead favoured aiming for legally binding emission reduction targets. Due to challenges in securing international agreement to strengthen the only partially successful Kyoto Protocol, pledge-and-review was re-introduced as part of the 2009 Copenhagen Accord. Initially seen as an interim measure, by 2015 it had become the central approach of international efforts to encourage climate mitigation. Though in negotiations leading to the 2015 Paris Agreement, the name pledge-and-review was dropped; pledges are now formally called Nationally Determined Contributions.

== Mechanism ==
=== Pledges ===
The expected content for pledges depends on the specific implementation of pledge-and-review. Commitments to GHG emissions reduction targets are generally a core feature, though states have full freedom to set where that target lies. States can choose to express their reductions target in different ways. For example, in terms of absolute reductions in the volume of GHG emitted; for the Paris implementation, most developed nations included such a pledge. Yet states can instead commit to reducing GHG emissions in other ways, such as a percentage of GDP growth. As well as emissions reductions targets, the pledges can include intentions to implement climate adaptation measures, as well as specific industry level climate friendly policy, like support for various types of sustainable energy production. States are never legally required to meet the commitments in their pledges, but their progress is subject to review.

=== Reviews ===
The exact mechanism for reviews also varies depending on the specific implementation, and the review concept applies at several levels. Nations periodically review their own pledges, with a view to a one way increase in ambition. Pledges, both the level of commitment they contain, and actual progress in achieving the same, are also reviewed internationally, under the auspices of the UNFCCC. While the formal review processes run by the United Nations aim to be non adversarial, states can also be subject to informal reviews from NGOs, which can take a name and shame approach, though may also choose to "praise and encourage" nations that are doing more than comparable peers to limit climate change. In the implementation of pledge-and-review agreed at Paris in 2015, another level of review is the Global stocktake, where the pledges made by the world's nations are evaluated collectively.

== History ==
The pledge-and-review system was first proposed by Japan in 1991. In December 1990, in response to the threat of climate change, the United Nations established the Intergovernmental Negotiating Committee for a Framework Convention on Climate Change. It had become apparent that getting nations (Note: Or more formally, parties. In the context of international climate negotiations, parties are normally nations, but they can also be a supranational group negotiating collectively on behalf of its member states, as happens with the European Union.) to commit to legally binding emissions targets would be more challenging for greenhouse gas emissions (GHG) than it had been for emissions relating to sulphur pollution and depletion of the ozone layer. With the support of Britain and France, Japan made a proposal for a pledge-and-review system as an alternative. Various nations objected to the idea, however, so only a weakened form of pledge-and-review was included in the United Nations Framework Convention on Climate Change (UNFCCC) by the time it was signed at the 1992 Earth Summit. The pledge-and-review system was formally rejected at the first Conference of the Parties (COP) which took place in Berlin, 1995. The focus switched to negotiations aimed at legally binding emission reduction targets, as embodied by the 1997 Kyoto Protocol.

The Kyoto protocol has only aimed to impose emissions reduction targets on Annex parties (largely corresponding to advanced industrialised nations as of the late 20th century, plus some of the economies in transition). The non-Annex countries, including large emitters such as China, did not have targets at all. Even the Annex countries did not all accept the reduction targets, most notably the United States. At the 2009 Copenhagen Summit, the main focus was on strengthening the emission reduction targets. This failed. As a backstop measure, a revival of the voluntary pledge-and-review system was proposed by Australia. While the system was formally rejected for general adoption, 89 countries submitted such a pledge, including the 27 EU member states who issued a combined pledge. 47 of these nations were non-Annex countries. The nations which had made a Copenhagen pledge were collectively responsible for about 80% of global GHG emissions, much more than the 25% covered by Kyoto targets in the first commitment period or the 15% covered by the commitment period later agreed at the 2012 Doha summit.

The pledge-and-review system established at Copenhagen was formalised at the 2010 Cancún Summit. The system was further strengthened in the years leading up to the 2015 Paris Conference, though it was no longer called "pledge-and-review", with pledges instead formally labelled Nationally Determined Contributions (NDCs).

=== Relationship with other climate change mitigation methods ===
There are three broad approaches to coordinating mitigation efforts that nations can attempt to negotiate at international conferences. Setting a carbon price. The acceptance of legally binding emissions reductions targets imposed in a "top down" way by a central body such a United Nations agency. And the "bottom up" pledge-and-review system where each party autonomously decides its own contribution. These approaches can be complementary, though at various periods there have been disagreements as to whether the world's primary method ought to be pledge-and-review or emissions targets. Until about 2010, international negotiations focused largely on emissions targets. Previous environmental successes like the reduction of emissions causing acid rain, and especially the Montreal treaty which led to reduced emissions damaging the ozone layer, suggested that targets could be effective.

In practice however, it has been much more challenging to get nations to agree to binding targets relating to GHG. And even when they had signed up to a legally binding target, there is no reliable way to enforce such international law on a powerful nation. So after the relative failure of the Kyoto protocol and attempts to establish a more effective set of targets at Copenhagen, the pledge-and-review system became the dominant approach. As of 2020, international efforts to improve carbon price related mechanisms are still underway. Except at regional level in the EU, actual implementations have so far mostly occurred only at national and sub-national levels (e.g. in China, or in some U.S. states).

Climate negotiating groups, including most of the sub groups within G77+China. An important sub group not shown is the High Ambition Coalition, which pushed strongly for the 1.5 °C clause in the Paris Agreement.

Progress towards settling on pledge-and-review can be seen in the light of a decades long attempt to harmonise views between the US led Umbrella Group and the rest of the world, concerning which mitigation method should be central to global agreements on climate change. The other two big climate negotiating groups were the EU and G77+China. During the 1990s, the Umbrella Group was in favour of both pledge-and-review and carbon price. (Note: The Umbrella group have also generally been willing to accept legally binding emissions targets, but this has been to a degree conditional on economic rivals also accepting similar targets. At Copenhagen, the US included several of the larger members of G77+China among those it classed as an economic rival, and they were not willing to accept substantial reduction targets.)

But much of the EU and G77+China preferred to focus solely on legally binding emissions reduction targets, and they largely got their way during the nineties. The Kyoto protocol agreed in 1997 was focussed largely on emissions targets, with only a limited role for carbon price and no place for pledge-and-review. US engagement on global climate negotiations have tended to vary depending on who has been president. There was cautious engagement with Bush Sr, leadership with Clinton, dis-engagement with Bush Jr and enthusiastic leadership with Obama.

The two years (2009 and 2015) where there was most progress towards pledge-and-review coincided with the two years where there was the highest apparent recognition for US leadership among climate delegates from the rest of the world. In 2009, there was much enthusiasm for President Obama, which may have been a partial reason why it was possible to get pledge-and-review back on the table at the 2009 Copenhagen summit. Overall though, Copenhagen was seen as a failure, denting faith in Obama's climate leadership. After being relatively quiet on climate for two years, major domestic climate initiatives first announced in 2012 and talked up at the 2013 Warsaw and 2014 Lima CoPs, saw faith in Obama's climate leadership reach a new peak just before the 2015 Paris conference, where pledge-and-review became the central method for coordinating climate mitigation efforts.

== Criticism ==
In the early 1990s, the pledge-and-review system was heavily criticised by environmental groups; for example, Climate Action Network labelled it "hedge and retreat". It has also been criticised by academics, especially after the system was revived at Copenhagen with some calling it "scientifically inadequate" or "second best". However, other academics described pledge-and-review as an "essential pillar for climate change mitigation". A survey of participants at the 2011 Durban summit found that the biggest concern over pledge-and-review was the gap between what has been pledged and the level of action needed to meet the 2 degree target (limiting global warming to only 2 °C above pre industrial temperatures.).

Participants were least concerned about the voluntary nature of the pledges, suggesting that a system that lacked legally binding commitments could still have international legitimacy. Comparing NGOs with actual negotiators, the study found that in the case of Annex 1 NGOs, they were much more critical of pledge-and-review than negotiators from Annex 1 nations. Whereas with non Annex nations (mostly those in the global south), the opposite pattern emerged. Non annex NGOs were less critical about pledge-and-review compared to non Annex negotiators. Economic analyses of pledge-and-review bargaining suggests that the procedure can explain the successful development from Kyoto to Paris.
