= The Islamic Declaration on Global Climate Change =

The Islamic Declaration on Global Climate Change was a faith-based collective call of Islamic environmentalism to combat and tackle climate change addressed to Muslims all over the world. It was a result of a 2015 international symposium of representatives of academics, religious authorities, inter-governmental organisations, and civil society across a broad cross section of Muslim communities ahead of the Paris Climate Change Conference in 2015–2016.

== Event of Declaration ==
The Islamic Declaration on Global Climate Change was launched in Istanbul as part of a two-day International Islamic Climate Change Symposium in Istanbul in 17–18 August 2015. Hosted jointly by Organisation of Islamic Cooperation, ISESCO and International Islamic Fiqh Academy, the symposium was co-organised by Islamic relief worldwide, alongside the Islamic Foundation for Ecology and Environmental Science (IFEES), and supported by climate-based civil society network Climate Action Network (CAN). The declaration was endorsed by the grand muftis of Lebanon and Uganda, along with prominent Islamic scholars and teachers hailing from 20 countries all over the Muslim world.

== Message of the Declaration ==
The declaration is based on an environmental framework present within the principles of Islam, and is part of faith-based climate activism. Its core stems from the essence of a body of ethics known as the Knowledge of Creation (Ilm ul khalq), which is based on the Holy Qur’an. It is part of a spiritual fight against climate change, alongside similar calls by the Catholic Pope and other religious figures. The Islamic Climate Change Declaration iterates a call to reject human greed for natural resources, have respect for “perfect equilibrium” of nature, and focused on the need for recognition of the “moral obligation” towards conservation.

== Contents of the Declaration ==
The focus of the title is on climate change, and sidelines other ecological concerns. The preamble of the declaration begins with doctrinal affirmation that God created the world. This is connected to the concept of oneness and tied to the unity of creation, giving credence to the idea that the planet is shared by all humanity. The role of human beings as God's Khalifah on earth, or stewards of God's creation, forms a central tenet of the Islamic declaration on climate change, since human beings have failed to live to their duty of stewardship, and have corrupted and abused the earth instead. The example of Muhammad and his lifestyle is brought forward to highlight practical manifestations of Islamic principles of conservation and eco-friendliness.
