= Cooperative mechanisms under Article 6 of the Paris Agreement =

Part of the 2015 climate change treaty

Article 6 of the 2015 Paris Agreement sets out how countries (“Parties”) may cooperate voluntarily to implement their nationally determined contributions (NDCs). It is intended to allow higher ambition in mitigation and adaptation while promoting sustainable development, and it conditions cooperation on environmental integrity, transparency and robust accounting, especially to avoid double counting of the same mitigation outcome across countries’ NDCs.

The article establishes three cooperation pathways. Under Article 6.2, Parties may use “cooperative approaches” to transfer and use internationally transferred mitigation outcomes (ITMOs) through bilateral or multilateral arrangements, subject to guidance adopted by the Conference of the Parties serving as the meeting of the Parties to the Paris Agreement (CMA). Article 6.4 creates a UNFCCC-supervised crediting mechanism—referred to by the UNFCCC as the Paris Agreement Crediting Mechanism (PACM)—that registers mitigation activities and issues units (A6.4ERs), including provisions such as a share of proceeds for the Adaptation Fund and cancellation of a portion of units to deliver an overall mitigation in global emissions (OMGE). Article 6.8 establishes a framework and work programme for “non-market approaches”, which support cooperation without international transfers of mitigation outcomes.

Implementation depends on cross-cutting accounting and transparency arrangements that link Article 6 reporting to the Paris Agreement’s transparency system (Article 13), including tracking through registries and, where required, “corresponding adjustments” to ensure that an internationally used mitigation outcome is reflected in only one Party’s NDC accounting. Parties adopted the core “Article 6 rulebook” at COP26, and later CMA decisions have continued to operationalize technical standards and reporting infrastructure. The impacts of Article 6 remain debated, particularly around environmental integrity, governance capacity and the risk of over-crediting.

== Background and purpose ==
Article 6.1 of the Paris Agreement recognizes that some Parties may choose to pursue voluntary cooperation in implementing their nationally determined contributions (NDCs) “to allow for higher ambition” in mitigation and adaptation actions, while promoting sustainable development and ensuring environmental integrity.

Article 6 frames cooperative approaches as voluntary tools that may be used in implementing NDCs to support higher ambition. The mechanism established under Article 6.4 is also intended to “deliver an overall mitigation in global emissions”, in addition to enabling the transfer of mitigation outcomes between Parties. Article 6 also links cooperation to sustainable development: cooperative approaches under Article 6.2 are to promote sustainable development, and the Article 6.4 mechanism is intended to contribute to mitigation while fostering sustainable development.

For cooperative approaches under Article 6.2, the Paris Agreement requires Parties to ensure environmental integrity and transparency (including in governance) and to apply robust accounting “to ensure, inter alia, the avoidance of double counting”, consistent with guidance adopted by the Conference of the Parties serving as the meeting of the Parties to the Paris Agreement (CMA). The CMA guidance adopted at COP26 (CMA.3) includes requirements on “corresponding adjustments” and reporting intended to apply these accounting and integrity principles in practice.

== Key concepts and terminology ==
Article 6 summaries often use specialized accounting and carbon-market terminology; later sections explain these concepts in more detail.

- Internationally transferred mitigation outcomes (ITMOs): quantified mitigation outcomes (emission reductions or removals) transferred between Parties under Article 6.2 and used toward an NDC or another authorized international purpose, subject to agreed reporting and accounting rules intended to avoid double counting.
- Authorization and first transfer: authorization is a host Party decision specifying whether mitigation outcomes may be used internationally and for what purpose; “first transfer” refers to the first international transfer step that is linked to reporting and, where applicable, accounting under CMA guidance.
- Corresponding adjustment: the accounting adjustment used to prevent double claiming between Parties by ensuring a transferred outcome is reflected in only one Party’s NDC accounting, consistent with CMA guidance.
- Double counting: umbrella term commonly used for different problems, including double issuance (more than one unit issued for the same outcome), double claiming (both Parties claim the same outcome toward their NDCs), and double use (the same unit is used more than once or for more than one claim).
- Mitigation outcome vs. carbon credit: the mitigation outcome is the underlying quantified reduction or removal; a carbon credit is a unit issued by a crediting programme that can represent such an outcome and may be used in Article 6 cooperation if eligible and authorized by Parties.
- Registries and tracking and Article 6.4 features: Article 6 relies on registry and reporting infrastructure to record issuance, transfers, cancellations and use, supporting transparency and reconciliation across Parties and time periods. COP26 decisions for Article 6.4 also included a share of proceeds for the Adaptation Fund and cancellation of a portion of units to deliver an overall mitigation in global emissions (OMGE).

== Approaches under Article 6 ==
The Paris Agreement offers three ways in which Parties may cooperate on a voluntary basis.

=== Article 6.2: Cooperative approaches ===
Article 6.2 provides for “cooperative approaches” in which Parties may voluntarily transfer and use internationally transferred mitigation outcomes (ITMOs) without relying on the centralized crediting mechanism established under Article 6.4. Participating Parties are to promote sustainable development, ensure environmental integrity and transparency (including in governance), and apply robust accounting consistent with guidance adopted by the Conference of the Parties serving as the meeting of the Parties to the Paris Agreement (CMA), including measures intended to avoid double counting.

In practice, ITMOs can represent quantified emission reductions or removals and may be expressed in greenhouse-gas metrics (such as tCO_{2}e) or, where Parties determine, in other metrics. Cooperative approaches can be implemented through a variety of bilateral or multilateral arrangements, including crediting-based transfers and policy-based cooperation such as linked emissions trading systems, provided Parties authorize the use of outcomes and apply the agreed accounting framework.

CMA guidance links key accounting steps to authorization and “first transfer”. Where an ITMO is authorized for use toward another Party’s NDC (or other international purposes), Parties apply corresponding adjustments and disclose relevant information through Article 6 reporting under the Paris Agreement’s transparency framework (Article 13).

Commentators debate whether Article 6.2 transfers primarily lower costs and mobilize finance or risk undermining environmental integrity through over-crediting, unambitious baselines (“hot air”), or weak governance; assessments emphasize that outcomes depend on ambition and the strength of accounting, transparency and review safeguards.

=== Paris Agreement Crediting Mechanism (Article 6.4) ===
Under Article 6.4, Parties established a UNFCCC-supervised crediting mechanism—referred to by the UNFCCC as the Paris Agreement Crediting Mechanism (PACM)—to register mitigation activities and issue units for verified emission reductions or removals, while supporting sustainable development and delivering an overall mitigation in global emissions.

The PACM registers eligible mitigation activities and issues units known as Article 6.4 emission reductions (A6.4ERs), which are recorded in a mechanism registry with unique identifiers to enable tracking (e.g., issuance, transfer, cancellation, and use). COP26 decisions also included a share of proceeds for the Adaptation Fund and cancellation of a portion of issued units to deliver an overall mitigation in global emissions (OMGE).

Host Parties may determine whether A6.4ERs are authorized for international use (for example, toward another Party’s NDC or other international mitigation purposes) or retained as mitigation contribution units intended to support mitigation in the host Party. Authorized A6.4ERs interact with the broader Article 6 accounting and transparency framework intended to avoid double counting, including corresponding adjustments where applicable under CMA guidance.

The mechanism operates under the authority of the CMA and is supervised by the Article 6.4 Supervisory Body, which oversees the mechanism’s implementation framework and centralized infrastructure for registration, issuance and tracking.

Host Parties participate through domestic arrangements, including designating national authorities and providing required approvals for activities and, where relevant, authorizations when A6.4ERs are intended for international use.

In outline, an Article 6.4 activity is developed against approved requirements (including methodologies), validated and registered under the mechanism, monitored and independently verified for a crediting period, and then issued as A6.4ERs into the mechanism registry. Host Party approvals and any authorization for international use are part of this activity cycle, and the registry records whether issued units are authorized for transfer or retained as mitigation contribution units.

=== Article 6.8: Non-market approaches ===
Article 6.8 establishes a framework for voluntary cooperation through “non-market approaches” (NMAs). Unlike cooperative approaches under Article 6.2 and the crediting mechanism under Article 6.4, NMAs do not involve the international transfer of mitigation outcomes between Parties. UNFCCC guidance describes NMAs as cooperation that can integrate mitigation and adaptation and may also involve finance, technology transfer, and capacity building, while contributing to sustainable development and poverty eradication.

At the COP26 meeting (CMA.3, Glasgow, 2021), Parties adopted a work programme under Article 6.8 and established the Glasgow Committee on Non-market Approaches (GCNMA) to support implementation of the framework. The work programme’s initial focus areas include adaptation, resilience and sustainability; mitigation measures that contribute to sustainable development; and development of clean energy sources. UNFCCC materials describe work programme activities such as identifying opportunities for coordination and synergies across instruments and institutional arrangements, developing and sharing case studies and best practices, and maintaining UNFCCC web-based tools (including a platform and discussion forum) for recording and exchanging information on NMAs.

The GCNMA began its work in 2022 and holds regular meetings and workshops, alongside calls for submissions and technical papers, as part of a multi-year work programme.

== Accounting, reporting and transparency architecture ==
Article 6 cooperation is linked to the Paris Agreement’s transparency framework (Article 13). Participating Parties are expected to report what they authorize, transfer, acquire, cancel or use, and how those actions are reflected in NDC accounting, including the corresponding adjustments used to avoid double claiming for authorized international uses.

For Article 6.2, CMA guidance sets out a reporting package that includes an initial report, annual information on transfers and authorizations, and regular information submitted through biennial transparency reporting for the relevant NDC implementation period. The UNFCCC compiles and publishes Party-submitted information through a centralized accounting and reporting platform linked to an Article 6 database.

Tracking relies on registries that record actions such as issuance, transfer, cancellation and use. Parties may use domestic registries or UNFCCC registry services for Article 6.2, while the Article 6.4 mechanism uses a UNFCCC mechanism registry for issued units. Analyses describe registry and reporting linkages as important for reconciling what Parties report and supporting environmental integrity.

Common “double counting” risks and control points described in Article 6.2 guidance and secondary analyses include the following:

Double counting risks and typical control points (Article 6.2 cooperative approaches)
Risk	What it looks like in practice	Typical control point
Double claiming (between Parties)	Both the transferring Party and the acquiring Party treat the same mitigation outcome as contributing to their NDC achievement.	Apply a corresponding adjustment linked to authorization/first transfer, and disclose it through Article 6 reporting under the Article 13 transparency framework.
Multiple use across purposes	A mitigation outcome is used toward an NDC and also claimed for another authorized purpose (or otherwise re-used), creating more than one claim on the same outcome.	Specify intended uses in authorization; track transfers/uses in domestic arrangements (including tracking systems/registries where used); and report authorizations, first transfer and use through the Article 6 reporting package (initial report, annual information and biennial transparency reporting).
Opaque or inconsistent authorization	It is unclear whether (and for what purpose) the host Party has authorized the transfer and use of a mitigation outcome, complicating accounting and adjustment.	Require explicit authorization and include authorization/participation information in the initial report and subsequent reporting so transfers can be reconciled with accounting.
Timing or period mismatch	The transfer is recorded in one year (or NDC implementation period) but the acquiring Party uses it in another, risking misaligned adjustments across time.	Tie accounting to defined steps such as first transfer and report annual information and corresponding adjustments for the relevant NDC implementation period.
Missing or delayed reporting	Transfers and adjustments are not reported (or are reported late), making it difficult to check whether both Parties’ accounts reconcile.	Reporting and review under the Paris Agreement transparency framework (including technical expert review) is intended to surface inconsistencies and support public traceability of transfers and adjustments.

== Implementation and early use cases ==
Article 6.2 cooperative approaches have been implemented through a range of bilateral and policy-linked arrangements. Examples include:

- Bilateral agreements and early transfers: Several Parties have pursued Article 6.2 through bilateral cooperative agreements that specify how mitigation outcomes will be authorized, transferred and accounted for (including the application of corresponding adjustments). By 2024, over 80 bilateral cooperation agreements were reported as being in place, and early transactions included an ITMO trade between Thailand and Switzerland (reported as the first completed ITMO trade in January 2024), as well as a later transfer from Ghana to Switzerland in 2025 linked to an improved cookstove project. Such bilateral arrangements are intended to pair transfers with corresponding adjustments and transparency reporting so that a transferred mitigation outcome is not counted toward both Parties’ NDCs.
- Authorizing crediting-programme units as ITMOs: Cooperative approaches may transfer mitigation outcomes represented by units from crediting programmes (often described as carbon credits) where the host Party authorizes those units as ITMOs. One early reported example was Rwanda’s authorization of credits issued under the Gold Standard certification for use as Article 6.2 mitigation outcomes. Where outcomes are authorized for NDC use or other international mitigation purposes, reporting and corresponding adjustments are used to manage double-counting risks and align the transfer with Paris Agreement accounting.
- Domestic carbon-pricing links (using Article 6 implementation agreements): Some Parties have linked Article 6 cooperation to domestic carbon-pricing policies by signing Article 6 memoranda of understanding or legally binding implementation agreements with partner countries and then allowing domestic entities to use eligible credits sourced through those Article 6 deals, subject to limits and applicable accounting requirements. For example, Singapore has signed memoranda of understanding with Laos and the Philippines and “implementation agreements” with Ghana and Papua New Guinea, and Singapore firms can offset up to 5% of taxable carbon emissions by buying credits through Article 6 deals.

=== Relationship to voluntary carbon markets ===
Article 6 cooperation is conducted between Parties under the Paris Agreement. When a mitigation outcome is authorized for international use (for example as an internationally transferred mitigation outcome under Article 6.2 or through the Article 6.4 crediting mechanism), Parties report it and apply accounting rules intended to avoid double counting, including corresponding adjustments for authorized uses toward another Party’s NDC.

The voluntary carbon market is separate from the UNFCCC system and generally refers to organizations buying carbon credits without a legal obligation, often linked to voluntary climate claims or “beyond value chain” mitigation strategies. Voluntary and compliance credit markets can overlap, including when host governments authorize credits from independent programmes for use under Article 6, which can require an authorization decision and, where relevant, a corresponding adjustment so the same outcome is not claimed more than once. There are expectations that operationalizing Article 6 could influence voluntary-market demand and pricing, while voluntary credits remain governed by separate standards unless they are brought under Article 6 processes.

The Integrity Council for the Voluntary Carbon Market's CCP tagging guidance includes optional "CCP Attributes" intended to record whether a host country has authorised the use of credits for other international mitigation purposes under Article 6 of the Paris Agreement.

== Implementation status and negotiations ==
Following the adoption of the “Article 6 rulebook” at the COP26 (CMA.3, Glasgow, 2021), negotiations under Article 6 have focused largely on implementation—i.e., how the agreed rules are applied in practice through reporting, centralized infrastructure and technical standards—rather than on whether cooperation mechanisms should exist. Further guidance and updates have been adopted through later CMA decisions, including additional Article 6 decisions in 2024 (CMA.6) and 2025 (CMA.7).

Reporting around COP29 in Baku described additional standards being approved for a UN-backed carbon market under Article 6, while noting that further operational work remained for implementation through the Supervisory Body and subsequent CMA decisions.

== Criticism and debates ==
Scholarly and policy literature on Article 6 generally treats it as a potentially useful tool for international cooperation and finance flows, while emphasizing that outcomes depend on the ambition of participating Parties and on the strength of governance, accounting and transparency safeguards.

A recurring debate concerns environmental integrity and the risk of “hot air”. Analysts note that international transfers can weaken climate outcomes if mitigation outcomes are overestimated (for example because baselines or accounting choices inflate outcomes), or if transfers draw on unambitious NDCs such that reductions are “exported” without increasing overall mitigation. Related debates focus on double counting and authorization. Reviews emphasize that avoiding double claiming between Parties and multiple uses of the same outcome depends on clear host-country authorization decisions (including intended use) and on accounting and transparency systems that allow transfers and adjustments to be reconciled across countries and time periods.

For crediting approaches, a longstanding concern is additionality and baselines: whether credited reductions would have occurred anyway and whether baselines remain credible as policies, technology costs and regulations change. Observers also note that Paris-era crediting takes place alongside NDC targets, raising questions about how crediting, authorization choices and future NDC ambition interact, including how host countries manage the relationship between exported outcomes and domestic mitigation priorities over time.

Participation can also be institutionally demanding. Commentators note that Article 6 implementation often requires legal mandates and procedures for authorization, measurement and reporting capacity, and registry and tracking infrastructure, which may be unevenly available across countries. Separate debates address sustainable development and social safeguards: while Article 6 links cooperation to sustainable development, observers differ on how consistently sustainable-development outcomes are defined, monitored and safeguarded in practice, especially for activities affecting local communities or land use. Some guidance for host-country engagement emphasizes procedural elements such as alignment with domestic law, access to information, stakeholder consultation, and monitoring of claimed co-benefits, while critics argue that uneven governance and oversight can leave gaps and that clearer safeguard expectations may be needed in practice.

Analysts debate market impacts such as price formation, liquidity and fragmentation. Some reports describe growing interest in Article 6-aligned transactions but also uncertainty about long-run demand, the availability of supply that meets authorization and accounting conditions, and the implications for pricing and market depth across different unit types and claims frameworks. Commentators also highlight the potential for fragmentation and higher transaction costs if registries and reporting systems are not interoperable, or if accounting treatments differ across mechanisms and cooperative approaches.

== See also ==
- Paris Agreement
- Nationally determined contribution
- Carbon credit
- Clean Development Mechanism
