= List of parties to the Paris Agreement =

Parties to the Paris Agreement Parties Signatories Parties that withdrew Parties also covered by European Union ratification

The Paris Agreement is an agreement within the United Nations Framework Convention on Climate Change (UNFCCC) dealing with greenhouse gas emissions mitigation, adaptation and finance starting in the year 2020. The Agreement aims to respond to the global climate change threat by keeping a global temperature rise this century well below 2 degrees Celsius above pre-industrial levels and to pursue efforts to limit the temperature increase even further to 1.5 degrees Celsius.

== History ==
The language of the agreement was negotiated by representatives of 197 parties at the 21st Conference of the Parties of the UNFCCC in Paris and adopted by consensus on 12 December 2015. The Agreement was open for signature by States and regional economic integration organizations that are Parties to the UNFCCC (the Convention) from 22 April 2016 to 21 April 2017 at the UN Headquarters in New York. The agreement stated that it would enter into force (and thus become fully effective) only if 55 countries that produce at least 55% of the world's greenhouse gas emissions (according to a list produced in 2015) ratify, accept, approve or accede to the agreement. On 1 April 2016, the United States and China, which together represent almost 40% of global emissions, issued a joint statement confirming that both countries would sign the Paris Climate Agreement. 175 Parties (174 states and the European Union) signed the agreement on the first date it was open for signature. On the same day, more than 20 countries issued a statement of their intent to join as soon as possible with a view to joining in 2016. With ratification by the European Union, the Agreement obtained enough parties to enter into effect as of 4 November 2016.

== Parties ==
As of January 2026, 193 states and the EU have ratified or acceded to the Agreement. A further three states have signed the Agreement but not ratified it. The United States twice ratified the agreement but then withdrew. All 198 UNFCCC members have either signed or acceded to the Paris Agreement.

Party	Percentage of greenhouse gases for ratification	Date of signature	Date of ratification, acceptance, approval, or accession	Date of entry into force
Afghanistan	0.05%	22 April 2016	15 February 2017	17 March 2017
Albania	0.02%	22 April 2016	21 September 2016	4 November 2016
Algeria	0.30%	22 April 2016	20 October 2016	19 November 2016
Andorra	0.00%	22 April 2016	24 March 2017	23 April 2017
Angola	0.17%	22 April 2016	16 November 2020	16 December 2020
Antigua and Barbuda	0.00%	22 April 2016	21 September 2016	4 November 2016
Argentina	0.89%	22 April 2016	21 September 2016	4 November 2016
Armenia	0.02%	20 September 2016	23 March 2017	22 April 2017
Australia	1.46%	22 April 2016	9 November 2016	9 December 2016
Austria (Note: Also covered by European Union ratification.)	0.21%	22 April 2016	5 October 2016	4 November 2016
Azerbaijan	0.13%	22 April 2016	9 January 2017	8 February 2017
Bahamas, The	0.00%	22 April 2016	22 August 2016	4 November 2016
Bahrain	0.06%	22 April 2016	23 December 2016	22 January 2017
Bangladesh	0.27%	22 April 2016	21 September 2016	4 November 2016
Barbados	0.01%	22 April 2016	22 April 2016	4 November 2016
Belarus	0.24%	22 April 2016	21 September 2016	4 November 2016
Belgium	0.32%	22 April 2016	6 April 2017	6 May 2017
Belize	0.00%	22 April 2016	22 April 2016	4 November 2016
Benin	0.02%	22 April 2016	31 October 2016	30 November 2016
Bhutan	0.00%	22 April 2016	19 September 2017	19 October 2017
Bolivia	0.12%	22 April 2016	5 October 2016	4 November 2016
Bosnia and Herzegovina	0.08%	22 April 2016	16 March 2017	15 April 2017
Botswana	0.02%	22 April 2016	11 November 2016	11 December 2016
Brazil	2.48%	22 April 2016	21 September 2016	4 November 2016
Brunei	N/A (Note: Emissions of parties to the UNFCCC that had not yet submitted their first national communication to the UNFCCC secretariat with an emission inventory at the time of adoption of the Paris Agreement were not included in the figure for entry into force of the Agreement.)	22 April 2016	21 September 2016	4 November 2016
Bulgaria	0.15%	22 April 2016	29 November 2016	29 December 2016
Burkina Faso	0.06%	22 April 2016	11 November 2016	11 December 2016
Burundi	0.07%	22 April 2016	17 January 2018	16 February 2018
Cambodia	0.03%	22 April 2016	6 February 2017	8 March 2017
Cameroon	0.45%	22 April 2016	29 July 2016	4 November 2016
Canada	1.95%	22 April 2016	5 October 2016	4 November 2016
Cape Verde	0.00%	22 April 2016	21 September 2017	21 October 2017
Central African Republic	0.01%	22 April 2016	11 October 2016	10 November 2016
Chad	0.06%	22 April 2016	12 January 2017	11 February 2017
Chile	0.25%	20 September 2016	10 February 2017	12 March 2017
China (Note: Including Hong Kong and Macau.)	20.09%	22 April 2016	3 September 2016	4 November 2016
Colombia	0.41%	22 April 2016	12 July 2018	11 August 2018
Comoros	0.00%	22 April 2016	23 November 2016	23 December 2016
Congo, Democratic Republic of the	0.06%	22 April 2016	13 December 2017	12 January 2018
Congo, Republic of the	0.01%	22 April 2016	21 April 2017	21 May 2017
Cook Islands	0.00%	24 June 2016	1 September 2016	4 November 2016
Costa Rica	0.03%	22 April 2016	13 October 2016	12 November 2016
Côte d'Ivoire	0.73%	22 April 2016	25 October 2016	24 November 2016
Croatia	0.07%	22 April 2016	24 May 2017	23 June 2017
Cuba	0.10%	22 April 2016	28 December 2016	27 January 2017
Cyprus	0.02%	22 April 2016	4 January 2017	3 February 2017
Czech Republic	0.34%	22 April 2016	5 October 2017	4 November 2017
Denmark (Note: Excluding Greenland.)	0.15%	22 April 2016	1 November 2016	1 December 2016
Djibouti	0.00%	22 April 2016	11 November 2016	11 December 2016
Dominica	0.00%	22 April 2016	21 September 2016	4 November 2016
Dominican Republic	0.07%	22 April 2016	21 September 2017	21 October 2017
East Timor	0.00%	22 April 2016	16 August 2017	15 September 2017
Ecuador	0.67%	26 July 2016	20 September 2017	20 October 2017
Egypt	0.52%	22 April 2016	29 June 2017	29 July 2017
El Salvador	0.03%	22 April 2016	27 March 2017	26 April 2017
Equatorial Guinea	N/A	22 April 2016	30 October 2018	29 November 2018
Eritrea	0.01%	22 April 2016	7 February 2023	9 March 2023
Estonia	0.06%	22 April 2016	4 November 2016	4 December 2016
Eswatini	0.05%	22 April 2016	21 September 2016	4 November 2016
Ethiopia	0.13%	22 April 2016	9 March 2017	8 April 2017
European Union	N/A (Note: The emissions of the European Union are accounted for in the total of its individual member states.)	22 April 2016	5 October 2016	4 November 2016
Fiji	0.01%	22 April 2016	22 April 2016	4 November 2016
Finland	0.17%	22 April 2016	14 November 2016	14 December 2016
France	1.34%	22 April 2016	5 October 2016	4 November 2016
Gabon	0.02%	22 April 2016	2 November 2016	2 December 2016
Gambia, The	0.05%	26 April 2016	7 November 2016	7 December 2016
Georgia	0.03%	22 April 2016	8 May 2017	7 June 2017
Germany	2.56%	22 April 2016	5 October 2016	4 November 2016
Ghana	0.09%	22 April 2016	21 September 2016	4 November 2016
Greece	0.28%	22 April 2016	14 October 2016	13 November 2016
Grenada	0.00%	22 April 2016	22 April 2016	4 November 2016
Guatemala	0.04%	22 April 2016	25 January 2017	24 February 2017
Guinea	0.01%	22 April 2016	21 September 2016	4 November 2016
Guinea-Bissau	0.02%	22 April 2016	22 October 2018	21 November 2018
Guyana	0.01%	22 April 2016	20 May 2016	4 November 2016
Haiti	0.02%	22 April 2016	31 July 2017	30 August 2017
Holy See	N/A (Note: Emissions of states that were not a party to the UNFCCC at the time of adoption of the Paris Agreement, which were thus not permitted to sign the Agreement, were not included in the totals for entry into force for the Agreement.)		4 September 2022	4 October 2022
Honduras	0.03%	22 April 2016	21 September 2016	4 November 2016
Hungary	0.15%	22 April 2016	5 October 2016	4 November 2016
Iceland	0.01%	22 April 2016	21 September 2016	4 November 2016
India	4.10%	22 April 2016	2 October 2016	4 November 2016
Indonesia	1.49%	22 April 2016	31 October 2016	30 November 2016
Iraq	0.20%	8 December 2016	1 November 2021	1 December 2021
Ireland	0.16%	22 April 2016	4 November 2016	4 December 2016
Israel	0.20%	22 April 2016	22 November 2016	22 December 2016
Italy	1.18%	22 April 2016	11 November 2016	11 December 2016
Jamaica	0.04%	22 April 2016	10 April 2017	10 May 2017
Japan	3.79%	22 April 2016	8 November 2016	8 December 2016
Jordan	0.07%	22 April 2016	4 November 2016	4 December 2016
Kazakhstan	0.84%	2 August 2016	6 December 2016	5 January 2017
Kenya	0.06%	22 April 2016	28 December 2016	27 January 2017
Kiribati	0.00%	22 April 2016	21 September 2016	4 November 2016
Kuwait	0.09%	22 April 2016	23 April 2018	23 May 2018
Kyrgyzstan	0.03%	21 September 2016	18 February 2020	19 March 2020
Laos	0.02%	22 April 2016	7 September 2016	4 November 2016
Latvia	0.03%	22 April 2016	16 March 2017	15 April 2017
Lebanon	0.07%	22 April 2016	5 February 2020	6 March 2020
Lesotho	0.01%	22 April 2016	20 January 2017	19 February 2017
Liberia	0.02%	22 April 2016	27 August 2018	26 September 2018
Liechtenstein	0.00%	22 April 2016	20 September 2017	20 October 2017
Lithuania	0.05%	22 April 2016	2 February 2017	4 March 2017
Luxembourg	0.03%	22 April 2016	4 November 2016	4 December 2016
Madagascar	0.08%	22 April 2016	21 September 2016	4 November 2016
Malawi	0.07%	20 September 2016	29 June 2017	29 July 2017
Malaysia	0.52%	22 April 2016	16 November 2016	16 December 2016
Maldives	0.00%	22 April 2016	22 April 2016	4 November 2016
Mali	0.03%	22 April 2016	23 September 2016	4 November 2016
Malta	0.01%	22 April 2016	5 October 2016	4 November 2016
Marshall Islands	0.00%	22 April 2016	22 April 2016	4 November 2016
Mauritania	0.02%	22 April 2016	27 February 2017	29 March 2017
Mauritius	0.01%	22 April 2016	22 April 2016	4 November 2016
Mexico	1.70%	22 April 2016	21 September 2016	4 November 2016
Micronesia	0.00%	22 April 2016	15 September 2016	4 November 2016
Moldova	0.04%	21 September 2016	20 June 2017	20 July 2017
Monaco	0.00%	22 April 2016	24 October 2016	23 November 2016
Mongolia	0.05%	22 April 2016	21 September 2016	4 November 2016
Montenegro	0.01%	22 April 2016	20 December 2017	19 January 2018
Morocco	0.16%	22 April 2016	21 September 2016	4 November 2016
Mozambique	0.02%	22 April 2016	4 June 2018	4 July 2018
Myanmar	0.10%	22 April 2016	19 September 2017	19 October 2017
Namibia	0.01%	22 April 2016	21 September 2016	4 November 2016
Nauru	0.00%	22 April 2016	22 April 2016	4 November 2016
Nepal	0.07%	22 April 2016	5 October 2016	4 November 2016
Netherlands (Note: For the European Part of the Netherlands.)	0.53%	22 April 2016	28 July 2017	27 August 2017
New Zealand (Note: Extended to Tokelau on 13 November 2017 after initially excluding it.)	0.22%	22 April 2016	4 October 2016	4 November 2016
Nicaragua	0.03%		23 October 2017	22 November 2017
Niger	0.04%	22 April 2016	21 September 2016	4 November 2016
Nigeria	0.57%	22 September 2016	16 May 2017	15 June 2017
Niue	0.01%	28 October 2016	28 October 2016	27 November 2016
North Korea	0.23%	22 April 2016	1 August 2016	4 November 2016
North Macedonia	0.03%	22 April 2016	9 January 2018	8 February 2018
Norway	0.14%	22 April 2016	20 June 2016	4 November 2016
Oman	0.06%	22 April 2016	22 May 2019	21 June 2019
Pakistan	0.43%	22 April 2016	10 November 2016	10 December 2016
Palau	0.00%	22 April 2016	22 April 2016	4 November 2016
Palestine	N/A	22 April 2016	22 April 2016	4 November 2016
Panama	0.03%	22 April 2016	21 September 2016	4 November 2016
Papua New Guinea	0.01%	22 April 2016	21 September 2016	4 November 2016
Paraguay	0.06%	22 April 2016	14 October 2016	13 November 2016
Peru	0.22%	22 April 2016	25 July 2016	4 November 2016
Philippines	0.34%	22 April 2016	23 March 2017	22 April 2017
Poland	1.06%	22 April 2016	7 October 2016	6 November 2016
Portugal	0.18%	22 April 2016	5 October 2016	4 November 2016
Qatar	0.17%	22 April 2016	23 June 2017	23 July 2017
Romania	0.30%	22 April 2016	1 June 2017	1 July 2017
Russia	7.53%	22 April 2016	7 October 2019	6 November 2019
Rwanda	0.02%	22 April 2016	6 October 2016	5 November 2016
Saint Kitts and Nevis	0.00%	22 April 2016	22 April 2016	4 November 2016
Saint Lucia	0.00%	22 April 2016	22 April 2016	4 November 2016
Saint Vincent and the Grenadines	0.00%	22 April 2016	29 June 2016	4 November 2016
Samoa	0.00%	22 April 2016	22 April 2016	4 November 2016
San Marino	0.00%	22 April 2016	26 September 2018	26 October 2018
São Tomé and Príncipe	0.00%	22 April 2016	2 November 2016	2 December 2016
Saudi Arabia	0.80%	3 November 2016	3 November 2016	3 December 2016
Senegal	0.05%	22 April 2016	21 September 2016	4 November 2016
Serbia	0.18%	22 April 2016	25 July 2017	24 August 2017
Seychelles	0.00%	25 April 2016	29 April 2016	4 November 2016
Sierra Leone	0.98% (Note: Though corresponding with the source the provided number for Sierra Leone's emissions is incorrect. According to World Bank data, the correct 2000 emissions for Sierra Leone is 14,763 kt CO2-equivalents (not 365,107 kt), or 0.04% of the world total (not 0.98%).)	22 September 2016	1 November 2016	1 December 2016
Singapore	0.13%	22 April 2016	21 September 2016	4 November 2016
Slovakia	0.12%	22 April 2016	5 October 2016	4 November 2016
Slovenia	0.05%	22 April 2016	16 December 2016	15 January 2017
Solomon Islands	0.00%	22 April 2016	21 September 2016	4 November 2016
Somalia	N/A	22 April 2016	22 April 2016	4 November 2016
South Africa	1.46%	22 April 2016	1 November 2016	1 December 2016
South Korea	1.85%	22 April 2016	3 November 2016	3 December 2016
South Sudan	N/A	22 April 2016	23 February 2021	25 March 2021
Spain	0.87%	22 April 2016	12 January 2017	11 February 2017
Sri Lanka	0.05%	22 April 2016	21 September 2016	4 November 2016
Sudan	0.18%	22 April 2016	2 August 2017	1 September 2017
Suriname	0.01%	22 April 2016	13 February 2019	15 March 2019
Sweden	0.15%	22 April 2016	13 October 2016	12 November 2016
Switzerland	0.14%	22 April 2016	6 October 2017	5 November 2017
Syria	0.21%		13 November 2017	13 December 2017
Tanzania	0.11%	22 April 2016	18 May 2018	17 June 2018
Tajikistan	0.02%	22 April 2016	22 March 2017	21 April 2017
Thailand	0.64%	22 April 2016	21 September 2016	4 November 2016
Togo	0.02%	19 September 2016	28 June 2017	28 July 2017
Tonga	0.00%	22 April 2016	21 September 2016	4 November 2016
Trinidad and Tobago	0.04%	22 April 2016	22 February 2018	24 March 2018
Tunisia	0.11%	22 April 2016	10 February 2017	12 March 2017
Turkey	1.24%	22 April 2016	11 October 2021	10 November 2021
Turkmenistan	0.20%	23 September 2016	20 October 2016	19 November 2016
Tuvalu	0.00%	22 April 2016	22 April 2016	4 November 2016
Uganda	0.07%	22 April 2016	21 September 2016	4 November 2016
Ukraine	1.04%	22 April 2016	19 September 2016	4 November 2016
United Arab Emirates	0.53%	22 April 2016	21 September 2016	4 November 2016
United Kingdom	1.55%	22 April 2016	18 November 2016	18 December 2016
Uruguay	0.05%	22 April 2016	19 October 2016	18 November 2016
Uzbekistan	0.54%	19 April 2017	9 November 2018	9 December 2018
Vanuatu	0.00%	22 April 2016	21 September 2016	4 November 2016
Venezuela	0.52%	22 April 2016	21 July 2017	20 August 2017
Vietnam	0.72%	22 April 2016	3 November 2016	3 December 2016
Zambia	0.04%	20 September 2016	9 December 2016	8 January 2017
Zimbabwe	0.18%	22 April 2016	7 August 2017	6 September 2017
Total	80.74%	194		

=== European Union and its member states ===
Both the EU and its member states are individually responsible for ratifying the Paris Agreement. A strong preference was reported that the EU and its 28 member states deposit their instruments of ratification at the same time to ensure that neither the EU nor its member states engage themselves to fulfilling obligations that strictly belong to the other, and there were fears that disagreement over each individual member state's share of the EU-wide reduction target, as well as Britain's vote to leave the EU might delay the Paris pact. However, the European Parliament approved ratification of the Paris Agreement on 4 October 2016, and the EU deposited its instruments of ratification on 5 October 2016, along with several individual EU member states.

=== Sub-national territories ===
Some sub-national territories of parties are subject to a territorial exclusion from their sovereign state that is party to the Agreement. The party can then extend the ratification of the Agreement to said territory. While the UK did not make any declaration upon ratification, it did so in National Communications, last in its 8th NC in 2022. The militarily used British Indian Ocean Territory is not mentioned as being excluded.

Party	Territory	Date of Exclusion	Date of Approval	Date of entry into force
Denmark	Greenland	2016-11-01	2024-07-02	N/A
Netherlands	Aruba	2022-04-16	2016-04-22 (signed, not ratified)	N/A
Netherlands	Bonaire, Sint Eustatius and Saba	2022-04-16	N/A	N/A
Netherlands	Curaçao	2022-04-16	N/A	N/A
Netherlands	Sint Maarten	2022-04-16	N/A	N/A
New Zealand	Tokelau	2016-10-04	2017-11-13	N/A
UK	Anguilla	N/A	N/A	N/A
UK	Bermuda	N/A	N/A	N/A
UK	British Virgin Islands	N/A	N/A	N/A
UK	Cayman Islands	N/A	N/A	N/A
UK	Falkland Islands	N/A	N/A	N/A
UK	Isle of Man	N/A	2023-03-22	N/A
UK	Gibraltar	N/A	2022-10-03	N/A
UK	Guernsey	N/A	2022-04-29	N/A
UK	Jersey	N/A	2023-12-06	N/A
UK	Montserrat	N/A	N/A	N/A
UK	Pitcairn Islands	N/A	N/A	N/A
UK	Saint Helena, Ascension and Tristan da Cunha	N/A	N/A	N/A
UK	South Georgia and the South Sandwich Islands	N/A	N/A	N/A
UK	(United Kingdom) Sovereign Base Areas of Akrotiri and Dhekelia	N/A	N/A	N/A
UK	Turks and Caicos Islands	N/A	N/A	N/A

== Withdrawal from Agreement ==
Article 28 of the agreement enables parties to withdraw from the agreement after sending a withdrawal notification to the depositary, but notice can be given no earlier than three years after the agreement goes into force for the country. Withdrawal is effective one year after the depositary is notified. Alternatively, the Agreement stipulates that withdrawal from the UNFCCC, under which the Paris Agreement was adopted, would also withdraw the state from the Paris Agreement. The conditions for withdrawal from the UNFCCC are the same as for the Paris Agreement. In the agreement no provisions for non compliance are stated. The United States is the only state party to withdraw from the agreement.

Party	Percentage of greenhouse gases for ratification	Date of signature	Date of ratification, acceptance, approval, or accession	Date of entry into force	Date of notification of withdrawal	Date of withdrawal
United States (Note: Not a party between 4 November 2020 and 19 February 2021. The United States gave notice of its denunciation of the agreement on 4 November 2019, which came into effect on 4 November 2020. It accepted the agreement again on 20 January 2021, with entry into force again on 19 February 2021. On 27 January 2025 the United States again gave notice of its withdrawal from the agreement, which will be effective 27 January 2026.)	17.89%	22 April 2016	3 September 2016; 20 January 2021	4 November 2016; 19 February 2021	4 November 2019; 27 January 2025	4 November 2020; 27 January 2026

On 1 June 2017, then-US President Donald Trump announced that the United States would withdraw from the agreement. Since the agreement entered into force in the United States on 4 November 2016, the earliest possible date it could notify its intention to withdraw was 4 November 2019. If it had chosen to withdraw by way of withdrawing from the UNFCCC notice could be given immediately, since the UNFCCC entered into force for the US in 1994. In both cases, withdrawal would be effective one year later. According to a memo obtained by HuffPost believed to be written by US State Department legal office, any "attempts to withdraw from the Paris Agreement outside of the above-described withdrawal provisions would be inconsistent with international law and would not be accepted internationally." On August 4, 2017, the Trump administration delivered an official notice to the United Nations that the US intended to withdraw from the Paris Agreement as soon as it was legally eligible to do so. On 4 November 2019, the United States notified the depositary of its withdrawal from the agreement, which became effective one year later.

In one of his first executive actions, President Joe Biden signed an order for the United States to rejoin the agreement. Joe Biden was greeted by French President Emmanuel Macron with a "Welcome back to the Paris Agreement!". On January 20, 2025, shortly after his second inauguration, President Trump signed an executive order titled "Putting America First In International Environmental Agreements", to withdraw the United States from the agreement for a second time.

== Signatories ==
A further three states have signed but not ratified the Paris Agreement.

Signatory	Percentage of greenhouse gases for ratification	Date of signature
Iran	1.30%	22 April 2016
Libya	N/A	22 April 2016
Yemen	0.07%	23 September 2016
Total	1.38%	3
