= Nationally determined contribution =

Component of international climate change agreements

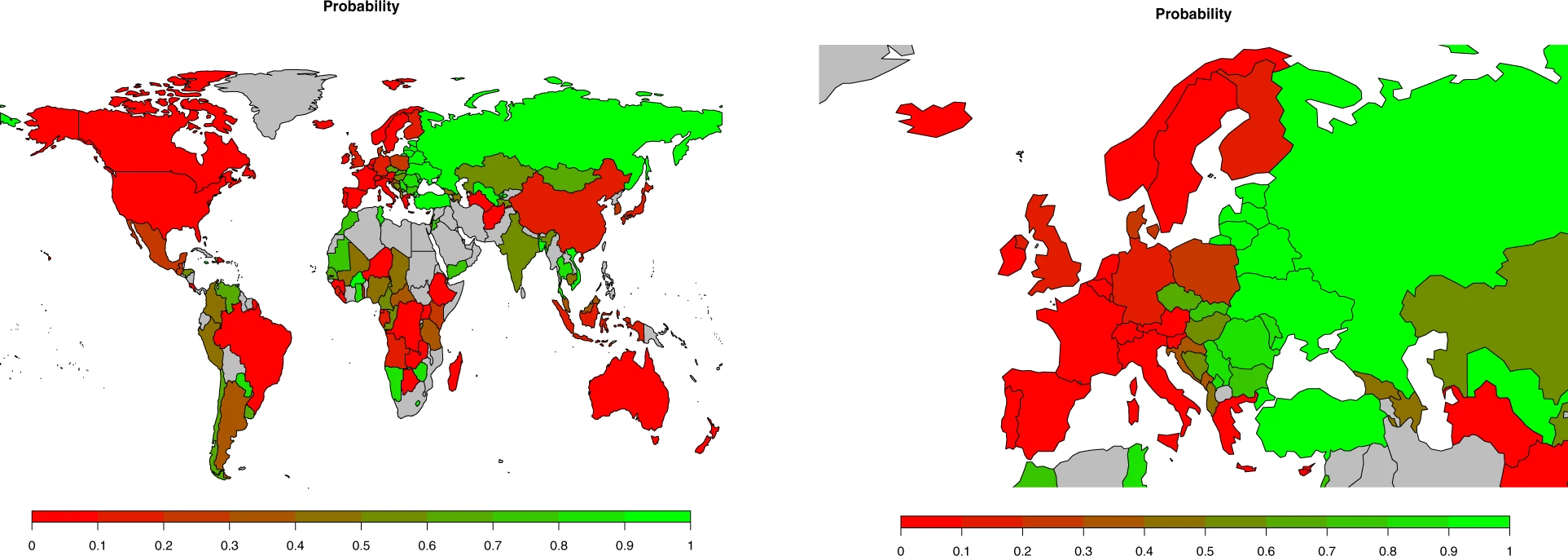
Probability that countries achieve their Paris Agreement Goals according to their nationally determined contributions (left: entire world; right: Europe only)

The nationally determined contributions (NDCs) are commitments that countries make to reduce their greenhouse gas emissions as part of climate change mitigation. These commitments include the necessary policies and measures for achieving the global targets set out in the Paris Agreement. The Paris Agreement has a long-term temperature goal which is to keep the rise in global surface temperature to well below 2 °C (3.6 °F) above pre-industrial levels. The treaty also states that preferably the limit of the increase should only be 1.5 °C (2.7 °F). To achieve this temperature goal, greenhouse gas emissions should be reduced as soon as, and by as much as, possible. To stay below 1.5 °C of global warming, emissions need to be cut by roughly 50% by 2030. This figure takes into account each country's documented pledges or NDCs.

NDCs embody efforts by each country to reduce national emissions and adapt to the impacts of climate change. The Paris Agreement requires each of the 195 Parties to prepare, communicate and maintain NDCs outlining what they intend to achieve. NDCs must be updated every five years. The NDCs due before the 2025 United Nations Climate Change Conference are called NDC 3.0, and some countries have published them. Some are accompanied by information to facilitate clarity, transparency and understanding (ICTU).

Prior to the Paris Agreement in 2015, the NDCs were referred to as intended nationally determined contributions (INDCs) and were non-binding. The INDCs were initial, voluntary pledges made by countries, whereas the NDCs are more committed but also not legally binding.

The rates of emissions reductions need to increase by 80% beyond NDCs to likely meet the 2 °C upper target range of the Paris Agreement (data as of 2021). The probabilities of major emitters meeting their NDCs without such an increase is very low. Therefore, with current trends the probability of staying below 2 °C of warming is only 5% – and if NDCs were met and continued post-2030 by all signatory systems the probability would be 26%.

== Role within Paris Agreement ==
Nationally determined contributions (NDCs) are "at the heart of the Paris Agreement and the achievement of its long-term goals".

Countries determine themselves what contributions they should make to achieve the aims of the treaty. As such, these plans are called nationally determined contributions (NDCs). Article 3 requires NDCs to be "ambitious efforts" towards "achieving the purpose of this Agreement" and to "represent a progression over time". The contributions should be set every five years and are to be registered by the UNFCCC Secretariat. Each further ambition should be more ambitious than the previous one, known as the principle of progression. Countries can cooperate and pool their nationally determined contributions. The Intended Nationally Determined Contributions pledged during the 2015 Climate Change Conference are converted to NDCs when a country ratifies the Paris Agreement, unless they submit an update.

The Paris Agreement does not prescribe the exact nature of the NDCs. At a minimum, they should contain mitigation provisions, but they may also contain pledges on adaptation, finance, technology transfer, capacity building and transparency. Some of the pledges in the NDCs are unconditional, but others are conditional on outside factors such as getting finance and technical support, the ambition from other parties or the details of rules of the Paris Agreement that are yet to be set. Most NDCs have a conditional component.

While the NDCs themselves are not binding, the procedures surrounding them are. These procedures include the obligation to prepare, communicate and maintain successive NDCs, set a new one every five years, and provide information about the implementation. There is no mechanism to force a country to set a NDC target by a specific date, nor to meet their targets. There will be only a name and shame system or as János Pásztor, the former U.N. assistant secretary-general on climate change, stated, a "name and encourage" plan.

== Process ==
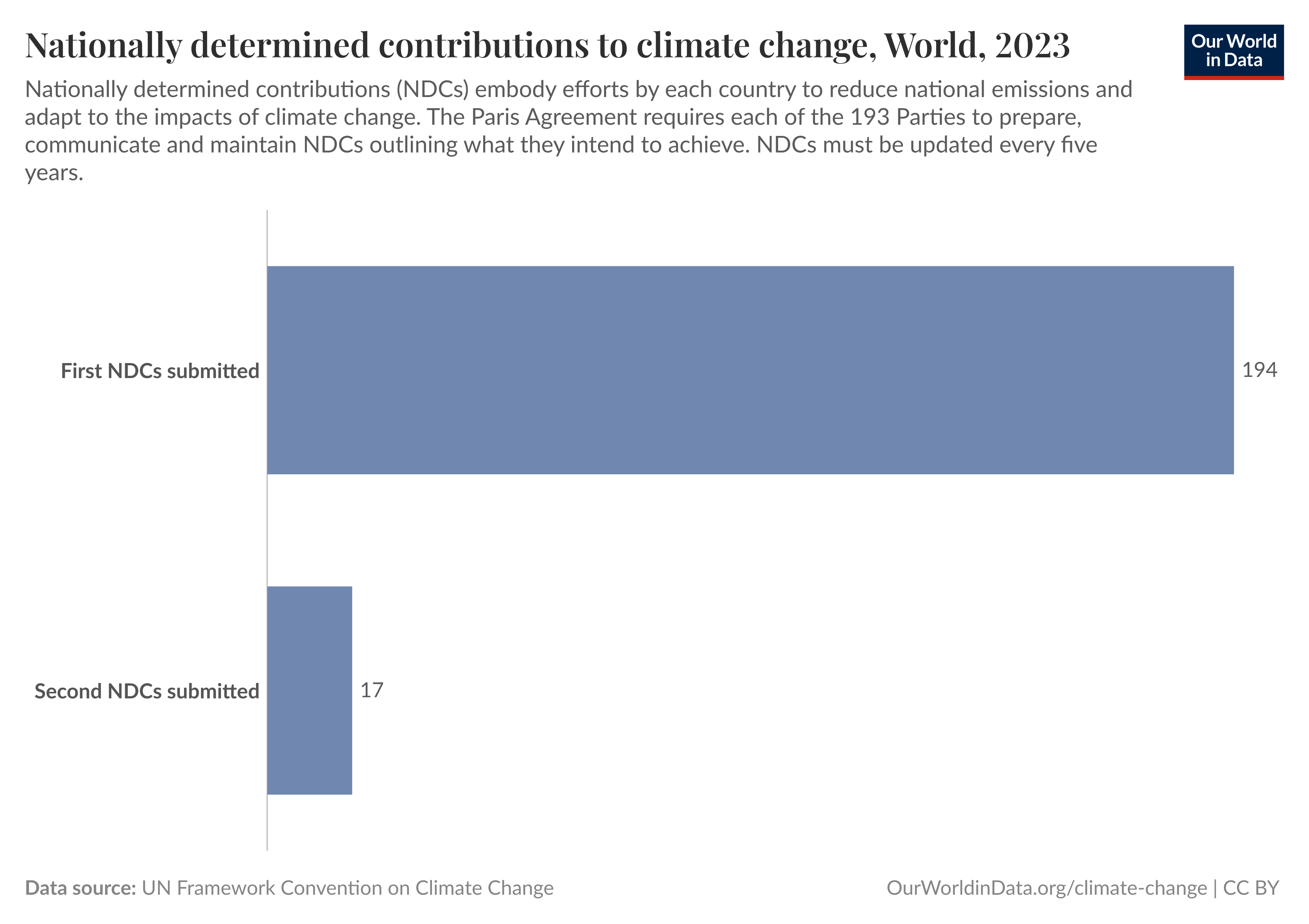
Number of countries that have submitted first and second versions of NDCs by 2023

Number of parties in multilateral environmental agreements, such as the United Nations Framework Convention for Climate Change

The establishment of NDCs combine the top-down system of a traditional international agreement with bottom-up system-in elements through which countries put forward their own goals and policies in the context of their own national circumstances, capabilities, and priorities. The overall goal is to reduce global greenhouse gas emissions enough to limit anthropogenic temperature rise to well below 2 °C (3.6 °F) above pre-industrial levels; and to pursue efforts to limit the increase to 1.5 °C (2.7 °F).

NDCs contain steps taken towards emissions reductions and also aim to address steps taken to adapt to climate change impacts, and what support the country needs, or will provide, to address climate change. After the initial submission of INDCs in March 2015, an assessment phase followed to review the impact of the submitted INDCs before the 2015 United Nations Climate Change Conference.

The information gathered from parties' individual reports and reviews, along with the more comprehensive picture attained through the "global stocktake" will, in turn, feed back into and shape the formulation of states' subsequent pledges. The logic, overall, is that this process will offer numerous avenues where domestic and transnational political processes can play out, facilitating the making of more ambitious commitments and putting pressure on states to comply with their nationally determined goals.

NDCs are the first greenhouse gas targets under the UNFCCC that apply equally to both developed and developing countries.

=== Timeframe ===
The NDCs should be set every five years and are to be registered by the UNFCCC Secretariat. The timeframes facilitate periodic updates to reflect changing circumstances or increased ambitions.

NDCs are established independently by the parties (countries or regional groups of countries) in question. However, they are set within a binding iterative "catalytic" framework designed to ratchet up climate action over time. Once states have set their initial NDCs, these are expected to be updated on a 5-year cycle. Biennial progress reports are to be published that track progress toward the objectives set out in states' NDCs. These will be subjected to technical review, and will collectively feed into a global stocktaking exercise, itself operating on an offset 5-year cycle, where the overall sufficiency of NDCs collectively will be assessed.

== Current status ==
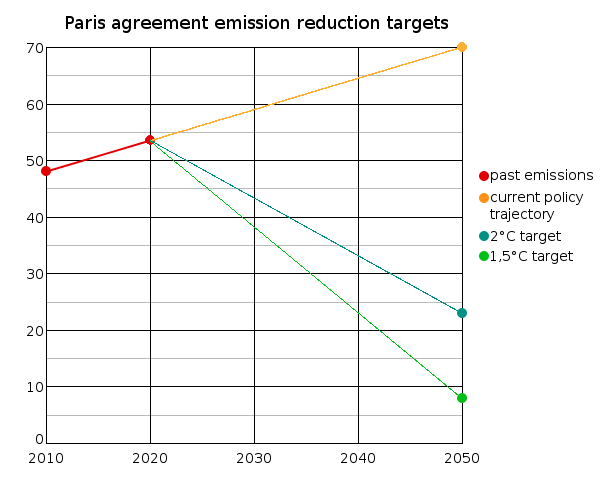
Paris climate accord emission reduction targets and real-life reductions offered

Through the Climate Change Performance Index, Climate Action Tracker and the Climate Clock, people can see on-line how well each individual country is currently on track to achieving its Paris agreement commitments. These tools however only give a general insight in regards to the current collective and individual country emission reductions. They do not give insight in regards on the emission reductions offered per country, for each measure proposed in the NDC.

The third round of NDCs contain targets for 2035. Officially, the submission deadline was set for February 2025. However, most countries submit their commitments late, meaning that as of 25 February 2026, 133 countries had submitted a new NDC..

The Sustainable Development Goal 13 on climate action has an indicator related to NDCs for its second target: Indicator 13.2.1 is the "Number of countries with nationally determined contributions, long-term strategies, national adaptation plans, strategies as reported in adaptation communications and national communications".

=== Components ===
Multiple civil society organizations use the NDC declarations to track coverage of different kinds of interventions as part of the NDC process. One of the most exhaustive of these, is the Climate Action Tracker, which evaluates the effectiveness of the proposed policies.

==== Just transition ====
A review of NDCs by the World Resource Institute in April 2025 found that the number of NDCs with the "just transition" commitment increased from 1 in 2015 (South Africa) to 66 in April 2025. For example, in the Nationally Determined Contribution for Chile, the "social" pillar of action includes multiple elements of a just transition, including a focus on minimizing impact of the economic changes on marginalized groups, including a governance mechanism that includes trade unions and community members alongside government and companies.

== Challenges ==
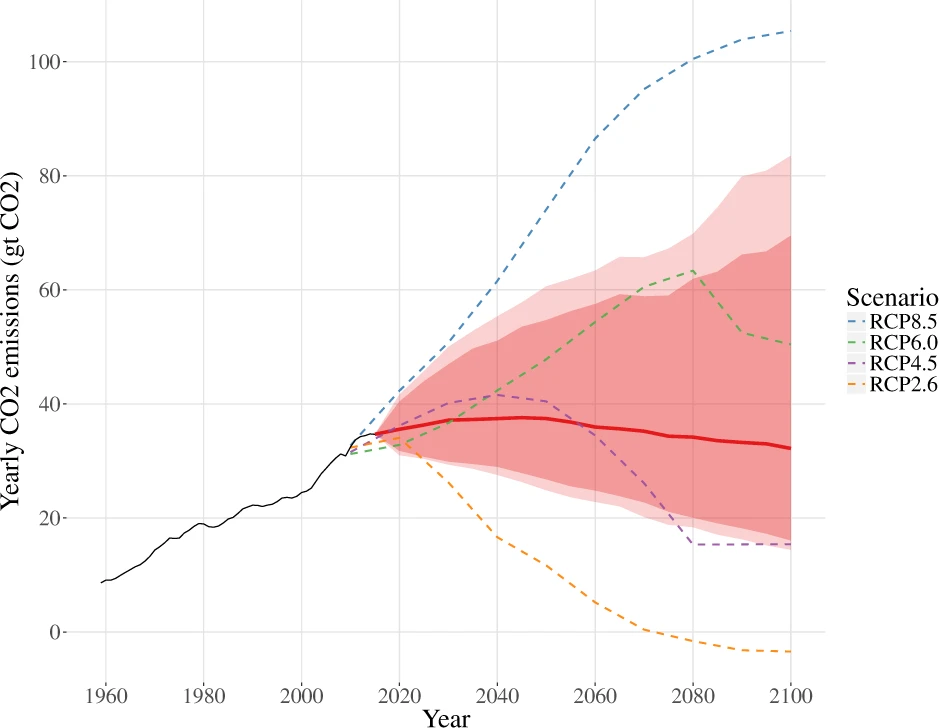
Updated probabilistic forecast of CO_{2} emissions, based on data to 2015

Countries face a number of challenges in NDC implementation, for example establishing political mandate for coordinating actions around NDCs and driving their implementation; and addressing resource constraints for developing and implementing climate change policy.

The rates of emissions reductions need to increase by 80% beyond NDCs to likely meet the 2 °C upper target range of the Paris Agreement (data as of 2021). The probabilities of major emitters meeting their NDCs without such an increase is very low. Therefore, with current trends the probability of staying below 2 °C of warming is only 5% – and if NDCs were met and continued post-2030 by all signatory systems the probability would be 26%.

== History ==
NDCs have an antecedent in the pledge and review system that had been considered by international climate change negotiators back in the early 1990s. All countries that were parties to the United Nations Framework Convention on Climate Change (UNFCCC) were asked to publish their intended nationally determined contributions (INDC) at the 2013 United Nations Climate Change Conference held in Warsaw, Poland, in November 2013. The intended contributions were determined without prejudice to the legal nature of the contributions. The term was intended as a compromise between "quantified emissions limitation and reduction objective" (QELROs) and "Nationally Appropriate Mitigation Actions" (NAMAs) that the Kyoto Protocol used to describe the different legal obligations of developed and developing countries.

After the Paris Agreement entered into force in 2016, the INDCs became the first NDC when a country ratified the agreement unless it decided to submit a new NDC at the same time. NDCs are the first greenhouse gas targets under the UNFCCC that apply equally to both developed and developing countries.

=== Intended nationally determined contributions (INDC) submissions ===
On 27 February 2015, Switzerland became the first nation to submit its INDC. Switzerland said that it had experienced a temperature rise of 1.75 °C since 1864, and aimed to reduce greenhouse gas emissions 50% by 2030.

India submitted its INDC to the UNFCCC in October 2015, committing to cut the emissions intensity of GDP by 33–35% by 2030 from 2005 levels. On its submission, India wrote that it needs "at least USD 2.5 trillion" to achieve its 2015–2030 goals, and that its "international climate finance needs" will be the difference over "what can be made available from domestic sources."

Of surveyed countries, 85% reported that they were challenged by the short time frame available to develop INDCs. Other challenges reported include difficulty to secure high-level political support, a lack of certainty and guidance on what should be included in INDCs, and limited expertise for the assessment of technical options. However, despite challenges, less than a quarter of countries said they had received international support to prepare their INDCs, and more than a quarter indicated they are still applying for international support. The INDC process and the challenges it presents are unique to each country and there is no "one-size-fits-all" approach or methodology.

== By country ==
Information about NDCs by country are shown in some of the country climate change articles below.

== See also ==
- Cooperative mechanisms under Article 6 of the Paris Agreement
- Economic analysis of climate change
- Net zero emissions – Rate of human-caused greenhouse gas emissions
