= Janos Pasztor (diplomat) =

Hungarian diplomat

- Born: 1955 (age 70–71)
- Occupations: Senior Fellow at the Carnegie Council for Ethics in International Affairs & Executive Director of the Carnegie Climate Geoengineering Governance Initiative

Janos Pasztor (born 1955) is a retired Hungarian diplomat. Before retirement, his last role was Senior Fellow at the Carnegie Council for Ethics in International Affairs and Executive Director of the Carnegie Climate Geoengineering Governance Initiative until the initiative's planned closure at the end of 2023. He was Assistant Secretary-General in the Executive Office of the Secretary-General of the United Nations in New York City and Senior Adviser to the Secretary-General on Climate Change between January 2015 and December 2016. Previously he has held positions at the World Wide Fund for Nature International where he was Policy and Science Director and acting Director for Conservation.

== Career in the UN ==
Pasztor has extensive experience of working in the United Nations with previous roles including (2010-2012) Executive Secretary of the UN Secretary-General’s High-level Panel on Global Sustainability (GSP); (2008-2010) Director of UN Secretary-General’s Climate Change Support Team; (2007) Director, UN Environment Management Group (EMG), United Nations Environment Programme (UNEP); (1993-2006) Various positions at the secretariat of the United Nations Framework Convention on Climate Change (UNFCCC), initially in Geneva, and later in Bonn. The last position was Coordinator, Project-based Mechanisms Programme; (1990-1992) Senior Programme Officer, Atmosphere and Energy, Secretariat of the United Nations Conference on Environment and Development (UNCED, or the “Earth Summit ‘92”); and (1986-1989) Energy Programme Officer, United Nations Environment Programme (UNEP).

== Career outside of the UN ==
From 2012-2015 he was Policy and Science Director, and from May 2015 Acting Executive Director for Conservation at WWF International; (1989-1990) he was a Research Associate, Stockholm Environment Institute; (1985-1986) Senior Programme Officer, Energy at the World Commission on Environment and Development (the “Brundtland Commission”); (1984) Research Associate, The Beijer Institute; (1979 – 1983) Director, Energy for my Neighbour Programme, World Council of Churches (WCC).

== Education and personal life ==
A national of Hungary (and later also of Switzerland), he holds a B.Sc. and M.Sc. in Nuclear Engineering from the Massachusetts Institute of Technology (MIT). He is married and has two children.
