= List of abbreviations relating to climate change =

This is a list of abbreviations relating to climate change causation, adaptation and mitigation.

== A ==
- ADP - Ad Hoc Working Group on the Durban Platform for Enhanced Action
- AGN - African Group of Negotiators
- APA - Ad Hoc Working Group on the Paris Agreement
- APP - Asia-Pacific Partnership on Clean Development and Climate
- AR4 - Fourth Assessment Report of the IPCC (2007)
- AR5 - Fifth Assessment Report of the IPCC (2014)
- AR5 SYR - Synthesis Report of AR5
- AR6 - Sixth Assessment Report of the IPCC (published on 9 August 2021)
- AWG-KP - Ad Hoc Working Group on further Commitments for Annex I Parties under the Kyoto Protocol
- AWG-LCA - Ad Hoc Working Group on Long-term Cooperative Action
- AYCC - Australian Youth Climate Coalition

== B ==
- BAP - Bali Action Plan

== C ==
- C&C - Contraction & Convergence, a global CO_{2} emissions management model promoted by the Global Commons Institute
- CAIT - The World Resources Institute's Climate Data Explorer archive
- CAPP - Climate Action Pacific Partnership
  - CAPP II - Climate Action Pacific Partnership (CAPP) Conference II (2018)
  - CAPP III - Third meeting of the Climate Action Pacific Partnership Conference (29-30 April 2019)
- CCA - Climate Change Agreement (UK)
- CCAFS - Climate Change, Agriculture and Food Security Research Program
- CCAF - Climate Change Action Fund (Australia)
- CCC - Committee on Climate Change (UK)
- CCCEP - Centre for Climate Change Economics and Policy
- CCCR - Canada's Changing Climate Report
- CCCS - Centre for Climate Change Studies, University of Dar es Salaam
- CCF - The Scottish Government's Climate Challenge Fund
- CCIA - Climate Change in Australia
- CC:iNet - Climate Change Information Network
- CCL - Climate Change Levy (UK)
- CCl_{2}F_{2} - Dichlorodifluoromethane (greenhouse gas)
- CCLS - Cambridge Climate Lecture Series
- CCRA - Climate Change Risk Assessment (Note: Under the 2008 Climate Change Act the UK Government must publish a UK-wide Climate Change Risk Assessment (CCRA) every five years.)
- CCS - Carbon Capture and Storage
- CCSO - Climate Change Support Office, within the United States' Department of State.
- CCUS - Carbon capture, utilization, and sequestration
- CDM - Clean Development Mechanism
- CDP - Organisation formerly known as the Carbon Disclosure Project
- CDR - Carbon dioxide removal
- CER - Certified Emission Reduction
- CFC - Chlorofluorocarbon
- CFRF - Climate Financial Risk Forum (UK)
- CF_{4} - Carbon tetrafluoride or tetrafluoromethane (greenhouse gas)
- CGE - Consultative Group of Experts
- CHClF_{2} - Chlorodifluoromethane (greenhouse gas)
- CH_{4} - Methane
- CINC - Interdepartmental Committee of Climate Negotiators
- CLP - The Carbon Literacy Project (CLP)
- CMA - Meeting of the Parties to the Paris Agreement
  - CMA1 - First meeting of the Parties to the Paris Agreement (7-18 November 2016)
    - CMA1.2 - The second part of the first session of the Conference of the meeting of the Parties to the Paris Agreement (6-17 November 2017)
    - CMA1.3 - The third part of the first session of the Conference of the meeting of the Parties to the Paris Agreement (2-14 December 2018)
  - CMA2 - Second meeting of the Parties to the Paris Agreement (2–13 December 2019)
  - CMA3 - Third meeting of the Parties to the Paris Agreement (postponed to 1–12 December 2021)
- CMIP - Coupled Model Intercomparison Project
  - CMIP5 - Coupled Model Intercomparison Project, Phase 5
- CMP - Conference of the Parties Serving as the Meeting of Parties to the Kyoto Protocol
  - CMP9 - 9th meeting of the Parties to the Kyoto Protocol (11-23 November 2013)
  - CMP10 - 10th meeting of the Parties to the Kyoto Protocol (1-12 December 2014)
  - CMP11 - 11th meeting of the Parties to the Kyoto Protocol (30 November-12 December 2015)
  - CMP12 - 12th meeting of the Parties to the Kyoto Protocol (7-18 November 2016)
  - CMP13 - 13th meeting of the Parties to the Kyoto Protocol (6-17 November 2017)
  - CMP14 - 14th meeting of the Parties to the Kyoto Protocol (2-15 December 2018)
  - CMP15 - 15th meeting of the Parties to the Kyoto Protocol (2–13 December 2019)
  - CMP16 - 16th meeting of the Parties to the Kyoto Protocol (postponed to 1–12 December 2021)
- CNZ - Carbon Net Zero
- CO_{2} - Carbon dioxide
- CO_{2}-e - Carbon dioxide equivalent, also CO_{2}-eq
- CoM - Covenant of Mayors for Climate and Energy (Europe)
- COP - Conference of the Parties [to the UNFCCC]
  - COP1 - First UNFCCC Conference of the Parties (28 March to 7 April 1995)
  - COP2 - Second UNFCCC Conference of the Parties (8-18 July 1996)
  - COP3 - Third UNFCCC Conference of the Parties (1-10 December 1997)
  - COP4 - Fourth UNFCCC Conference of the Parties (2-14 November 1998)
  - COP5 - Fifth UNFCCC Conference of the Parties (25 October to 5 November 1999)
  - COP6 - Sixth UNFCCC Conference of the Parties (13–25 November 2000)
  - COP6-bis - Resumed Session of COP6 (16-27 July 2001)
  - COP7 - Seventh UNFCCC Conference of the Parties (29 October - 10 November 2001)
  - COP8 - Eighth UNFCCC Conference of the Parties (23 October - 1 November 2002)
  - COP9 - Ninth UNFCCC Conference of the Parties (1-12 December 2003)
  - COP10 - Tenth UNFCCC Conference of the Parties (6-14 December 2004)
  - COP11 - Eleventh UNFCCC Conference of the Parties (28 November - 9 December 2005)
  - COP12 - Twelfth UNFCCC Conference of the Parties (6-17 November 2006)
  - COP13 - 13th UNFCCC Conference of the Parties (3-15 December 2007)
  - COP14 - 14th UNFCCC Conference of the Parties (1-12 December 2008)
  - COP15 - 15th UNFCCC Conference of the Parties (7-18 December 2009)
  - COP16 - 16th UNFCCC Conference of the Parties (29 November - 10 December 2010)
  - COP17 - 17th UNFCCC Conference of the Parties (28 November - 11 December 2011)
  - COP18 - 18th UNFCCC Conference of the Parties (26 November - 6 December 2012)
  - COP19 - 19th UNFCCC Conference of the Parties (11-23 November 2013)
  - COP20 - 20th UNFCCC Conference of the Parties (1-12 December 2014)
  - COP21 - 21st UNFCCC Conference of the Parties (30 November-12 December 2015)
  - COP22 - 22nd UNFCCC Conference of the Parties (7-18 November 2016)
  - COP23 - 23rd UNFCCC Conference of the Parties (6-17 November 2017)
  - COP24 - 24th UNFCCC Conference of the Parties (2-15 December 2018)
  - COP25 - 25th UNFCCC Conference of the Parties (2-13 December 2019)
  - COP26 - 26th UNFCCC Conference of the Parties (1-12 November 2021)
  - COP27 - 27th UNFCCC Conference of the Parties (6-18 November 2022)
  - COP28 - 28th UNFCCC Conference of the Parties (30 November - 13 December 2023), held in the United Arab Emirates
  - COP29 - 29th UNFCCC Conference of the Parties (11-22 November 2024), held in Baku
  - COP30 - 2025 UNFCCC Conference of the Parties (10-21 November 2025), held in Belém, Brazil.
  - COP31 - anticipated 2026 UNFCCC Conference of the Parties, to be held in Antalya, Turkey from 9 to 20 November, 2026
  - COP32 - anticipated 2027 UNFCCC Conference of the Parties, to be held in Addis Ababa, Ethiopia
  - COP33 - anticipated 2028 UNFCCC Conference of the Parties. Indian Prime Minister Narendra Modi has proposed hosting COP33 in India.
- CORSIA - Carbon Offsetting and Reduction Scheme for International Aviation
- CPA - Carbon Pricing Act (Singapore)
- CPRS - Carbon Pollution Reduction Scheme (Australia)
- CRC - CRC Energy Efficiency Scheme, formerly Carbon Reduction Commitment (UK)
- CREWS - Climate Risk and Early Warning Systems
- CRU - Climatic Research Unit at the University of East Anglia
- CRU TS - Climatic Research Unit Time Series datasets
- CSA - Climate-Smart Agriculture
- CVF - Climate Vulnerable Forum
- C40 - group of cities (now 96) focused on fighting the climate crisis: see C40 Cities Climate Leadership Group

== D ==
- DCCEEW - Department of Climate Change, Energy, the Environment and Water in Australia
- DECC - Department of Energy and Climate Change (UK), now Department for Business, Energy and Industrial Strategy

== E ==
- ECI - Environmental Change Institute at the University of Oxford
- ECIU - Energy and Climate Intelligence Unit
- EPR - Extended Producer Responsibility
- ETC - Energy Transition Council
- ETS - Emissions Trading System
- ETSWAP - Emissions Trading Scheme Workflow Automation Project operated by the UK's Environment Agency

== F ==
- FAR - First Assessment Report of the IPCC (1990)
- F-gas - Fluorinated gas
- FICER - Fund for Innovative Climate and Energy Research
- FOLU - Forestry and other land use
- FFF - Fridays for Future

== G ==
- GCF - Green Climate Fund
- GCoM - Global Covenant of Mayors for Climate and Energy
- GHG - Greenhouse gas
- GST - Global Stocktake
- GtC - Gigatonnes of carbon
- GWP - Global warming potential
- GWP* - a measure of the change in global warming potential (GWP) over a period of time compared to the global warming potential at a selected base year.

== H ==
- HadCM3 - Hadley Centre Coupled Model, version 3
- HadGEM - Hadley Centre Global Environmental Model
  - HadGEM1 -
- HCFC - Hydrochlorofluorocarbon
- HFC - Hydrofluorocarbon

== I ==
- ICLEI - International Council for Local Environmental Initiatives
- IKI - International Climate Initiative (German: Internationalen Klimaschutzinitiative), a German Federal Government initiative
- IPCC - Intergovernmental Panel on Climate Change
  - IPCC-50 - the IPCC's 50th session (2019)
- IPCC-NGGIP - IPCC National Greenhouse Gas Inventories Programme
- ISO 1406x Series - ISO standards for climate change mitigation
- ISO 14090:2019 - ISO standard for adaptation to climate change — Principles, requirements and guidelines
- ISO/DIS 14091 - Adaptation to climate change — Guidelines on vulnerability, impacts and risk assessment
- ISO/TS 14092 - Adaptation to climate change — Requirements and guidance on adaptation planning for local governments and communities

== J ==
- JI - Joint Implementation

== K ==
- KiriCAN - Kiribati Climate Action Network
- KLD - Ministry of Climate and Environment (Klima- og miljødepartementet), Norway

== L ==
- LCDI - Low Carbon Development Indonesia
- LDCF - Least Developed Countries Fund
- LECBP - Low Emission Capacity Building Programme
- LEDS - Low-Emission Development Strategies
- LSCE - Laboratoire des sciences du climat et de l'environnement, Gif-sur-Yvette, France
- LULUCF - Land use, land-use change, and forestry

== M ==
- MCC - Mercator Research Institute on Global Commons and Climate Change, Berlin
- MPGCA - Marrakech Partnership for Global Climate Action
- MoCC - Ministry of Climate Change (Pakistan)
- MoEFCC - Ministry of Environment, Forest and Climate Change (India)
- MOP1 - 1st Meeting of the Parties to the Kyoto Protocol (28 November - 9 December 2005)
- MOP2 - 2nd Meeting of the Parties to the Kyoto Protocol (6-17 November 2006)
- MOP3 - 3rd Meeting of the Parties to the Kyoto Protocol (3-15 December 2007)
- MOP4 - 4th Meeting of the Parties to the Kyoto Protocol (1-12 December 2008)
- MOP5 - 5th Meeting of the Parties to the Kyoto Protocol (7-18 December 2009)
- MRF - Materials Recovery Facility
- MWE/CCD - Climate Change Department of the Ministry of Water and Environment (Uganda)

== N ==
- NAMA - Nationally Appropriate Mitigation Actions
- NAPA - National Adaptation Programme of Action
- NAZCA - Non-state Actor Zone for Climate Action
- NC - National Communication (under the Paris Agreement)
- NCQG - New Collective Quantified Goal: see 2024 United Nations Climate Change Conference
- NDC - Nationally Determined Contributions
- NECIA - Northeast Climate Impacts Assessment (USA)
- N_{2}O - Nitrous Oxide
- NRSP - National Reports Submission Portal

== O ==
- O_{3} - Ozone

== P ==
- PATPA - Partnership on Transparency in the Paris Agreement
- P-CAN - Place-based Climate Action Networks, a UK-based partnership between university researchers and the public, private and third sectors in tackling climate change, aiming to accelerate and sustain the transition to a low-carbon, climate-resilient society through the creation of local climate commissions.
- PCD - Petersberg Climate Dialogue
  - PCD X - Petersberg Climate Dialogue 10 (13-14 May 2019)
  - PCD XI - Petersberg Climate Dialogue (27-28 April 2020)
- PFC - Perfluorocarbon
- PIK - Potsdam Institute for Climate Impact Research (German: Potsdam-Institut für Klimafolgenforschung)
- PPN 006 - UK government standard for submission of carbon reduction plans by suppliers seeking to be awarded a major government contract.

== R ==
- RCP - Representative Concentration Pathway

== S ==
- SAR - Second Assessment Report of the IPCC (1995)
- SB 52 - Fifty-second session of the Subsidiary Body for Scientific and Technological Advice (SBSTA 52) and the fifty-second session of the Subsidiary Body for Implementation (SBI 52) (postponed to 2021)
- SB 56 - the Bonn Climate Change Conference, 56th session of the subsidiary bodies, held on 6 to 16 June 2022
- SBI - Subsidiary Body for Implementation
  - SBI 46 - Forth-sixth session of the Subsidiary Body for Implementation (8-18 May 2017)
  - SBI 47 - Forty-seventh session of the Subsidiary Body for Implementation (6-15 November 2017)
  - SBI 52 - Fifty-second session of the Subsidiary Body for Implementation (postponed to 2021)
- SBSTA - Subsidiary Body for Scientific and Technological Advice
- SBTi - Science Based Targets initiative (Note: A target is "science-based" if it is in line with the scale of reductions needed to keep the global temperature increase below 2°C above pre-industrial temperatures.)
- SCCF - Special Climate Change Fund
- SDA - Sectoral Decarbonization Approach
- SDGs - Sustainable Development Goals
- SECR - Streamlined Energy and Carbon Reporting framework (UK)
- SF_{6} - Sulfur hexafluoride
- SOCCOM - Southern Ocean Carbon and Climate Observations and Modeling Project
- SRCCL - Special Report on Climate Change and Land of the IPCC
- SRES - Special Report on Emissions Scenarios of the IPCC
- SR15 - IPCC's Special Report on Global Warming of 1.5 °C
- SSP - Shared Socioeconomic Pathway

== T ==
- TACC - Territorial Approach to Climate Change
- TAR - Third Assessment Report of the IPCC (2001)
- TCCC - Tarawa Climate Change Conference
- TCFD - Task Force on Climate-related Financial Disclosures
- tCO2 - Tonnes of carbon dioxide equivalent
- TD - Talanoa Dialogue
- TFI - Task Force on National Greenhouse Gas Inventories

== U ==
- UKCIP - Multi-disciplinary team formerly known as the UK Climate Impacts Programme, based at the Environmental Change Institute at the University of Oxford
- UKCP - UK Climate Projections
  - UKCP09 - UK Climate Projections 2009
  - UKCP18 - UK Climate Projections 2018
- UKHACC - UK Health Alliance on Climate Change
- UN CC:Learn - One UN Climate Change Learning Partnership
- UNEP - United Nations Environment Programme
- UNFCCC - United Nations Framework Convention on Climate Change
- USCAP - U.S. Climate Action Partnership

== W ==
- WCAS - World Climate Action Summit, held on 1–2 December 2023, during the COP28 United Nations Climate Change Conference.
- WCI - Western Climate Initiative
- WCRP - World Climate Research Programme
- WGI - Working Group I of the IPCC, which assesses the physical science of climate change
- WGII - Working Group II of the IPCC, which assesses the vulnerability of socio-economic and natural systems to climate change
- WGIII - Working Group III of the IPCC, which "focuses on climate change mitigation, assessing methods for reducing greenhouse gas emissions, and removing greenhouse gases from the atmosphere".
- WIM - Warsaw International Mechanism for Loss and Damage associated with Climate Change Impacts
- WMO - World Meteorological Organization
- WRI - World Resources Institute

== Numerical ==
- 4CMR - Former Cambridge Centre for Climate Change Mitigation Research
