= Farhana Yamin =

British lawyer

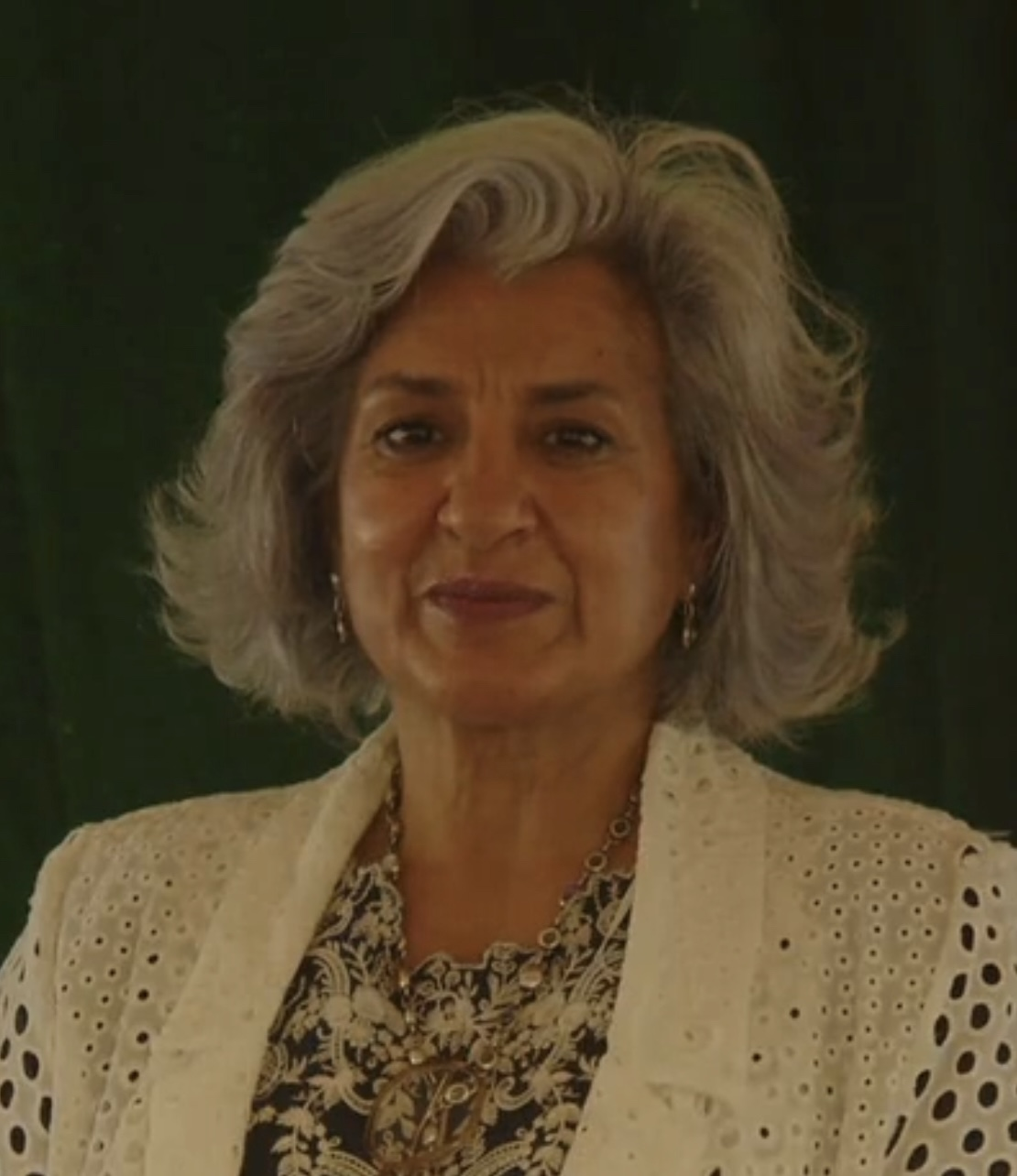
- Yamin in 2025 for Content Rising
- Born: 22 February 1965 (age 61)
- Occupation: Lawyer
- Known for: Climate policy, legal advice, public speaker and activism

Farhana Yamin (born 22 February 1965) is a British lawyer, public speaker and climate activist.

She is best known for being a key architect of the Paris climate agreement, and for her work as a legal and strategy advisor for small island and vulnerable nations such as the Marshall Islands, working on their behalf at international climate negotiations.

== Early life and education ==
Yamin immigrated to England from Pakistan. As a teenager, Yamin visited Greenham Common Women's Peace Camp and went on Rock Against Racism marches. Yamin read PPE at Somerville College, Oxford in 1983 following a programme by the Inner London Education Authority to increase the proportion of children from state schools at Oxford and Cambridge Universities. After graduating, she qualified as a solicitor in 1990 and landed an internship with a small environmental law firm the following year.

== Career ==
She has been a lead author of the Intergovernmental Panel on Climate Change (IPCC) as well as teaching at several universities.

From 1998 to 2002 she worked on legal and policy issues arising from international and European carbon markets and was a lead negotiator for the intergovernmental organisation Alliance of Small Island States (AOSIS) on the international carbon markets and the related rules dealing with the 1997 Kyoto Protocol. She was Director of the consortium that advised the European Commission on design of the European emissions trading directive from 1998 to 2002. Yamin later served for one year as a part-time special adviser to Connie Hedegaard, EU commissioner for climate action.

After helping to deliver the Marrakech Accords in 2001, international rules needed to complete the Kyoto Protocol, Yamin turned to working with larger developing countries and on linking climate and development policy.

From 2003 to 2009 Yamin worked primarily as a Senior Research Fellow at the Institute of Development Studies (IDS) at the University of Sussex but also provided advice to developing countries on climate negotiations. She was the Director of the BASIC Project and coordinated a consortium of 40 governmental departments and researcher bodies from Brazil, India, China and South Africa. This project examined the capacity & institutional challenges from climate change for these four major countries. In 2009, after the completion of the BASIC project, the countries used the project acronym, BASIC, to create an intergovernmental forum to continue their collaboration on climate negotiations.

Yamin has completed several publications including two books, and she has edited two IDS Bulletins examining the nexus between climate and development, including work from an initiative to establish climate adaptation as a major research theme at IDS and helped set up IDS's climate team.

From 2009 - 2012, she worked in philanthropy by joining the Children's Investment Fund Foundation (CIFF). She oversaw the Foundation's new climate projects, devised strategy papers and set up monitoring and evaluations processes. Whilst at CIFF, she was also a strategy and legal advisor to the Alliance of Small Islands States and advised countries like the Maldives. She played a pivotal role in creating the Cartagena Dialogue, a coalition of developed and developing countries working together in the aftermath of the diplomatic failure of COP15 in 2009 in Copenhagen.

She has been an academic teaching climate change law and policy for a number of courses at SOAS University of London, Kings College and University of Sussex. She was a visiting professor at University College London from 2013 - 2018.

She left CIFF to focus full-time on the climate negotiations from 2013 onwards to ensure the global community created an ambitious outcome under the Durban Platform which set up the Paris Agreement negotiations in 2016. Yamin worked as a strategist and negotiator for the Marshall Islands from 2013 - 2018, a period that covered the Paris negotiations and its entry into force which was led by the High Ambition Coalition.

The highlight of Yamin's work as a strategist and coalition builder is the inclusion of the goal of net zero emissions by 2050 in the Paris Agreement. She is widely credited with coming up with the idea of getting a long term "north star" or directional goal that is practical and actionable. She set up Track 0 in 2014 to help coordinate an international campaign that worked behind the scenes with negotiators as well as with NGOs and think tanks.

From 2017 to 2018, Yamin undertook research examining the role of lawyers and the use of increased climate litigation in raising ambition. She became frustrated with mainstream climate politics believing more radical actions, framings and tactics such as non-violent direct action were necessary.

Yamin joined Extinction Rebellion in November 2018. She was one of the Coordinators of its Strategy team in early 2019 and also Coordinator of XR's Political Team until 2020 when she stepped back from Extinction Rebellion due to disagreements with other leaders. She has taken part in many of their protests, including one where she glued herself to Shell's London offices.

Yamin is currently a Senior Associate at the UK think tank company Systemiq and an Associate Fellow at Chatham House. She is also a Fellow of the Royal Society of Arts (FRSA).

She is working as a Coordinator of Camden's Think and Do Community Climate and Eco Action pop up. This is an experimental project set up with the support of Camden Council, citizens and community groups to forge a prototype of a new kind of movement of "thinkers and doers" unifying everyone working on climate, social and ecological justice to create radical, collaborative solutions that work locally and can spread nationally and globally.

== Awards ==
In November 2020 she was included in the BBC Radio 4 Woman's Hour Power list 2020.

== Bibliography ==
- The International Climate Change Regime (with coauthor Joanna Depledge), published by CUP, 2004.
- Climate Change and Carbon Markets: A Handbook of Emissions Reduction Mechanisms, published by Earthscan, 2005.
