= 2004 United Nations Climate Change Conference =

Intergovernmental summit addressing global warming limits

United Nations Climate Change Conference COP10
- Dates: 6 December 2004– 17 December 2004
- Locations: Buenos Aires, Argentina
- Previous event: ← Milan 2003
- Next event: Montreal 2005 →
- Participants: UNFCCC member countries
- Website: Report of the conference of the parties

The 2004 United Nations Climate Change Conference took place between December 6 and December 17, 2004, in Buenos Aires, Argentina. The conference included the 10th Conference of the Parties (COP10) to the United Nations Framework Convention on Climate Change (UNFCCC).

The parties discussed the progress made since the first United Nations Climate Change Conference ten years ago and its future challenges, with special emphasis on climate change mitigation and adaptation. To promote developing countries better adapt to climate change, the Buenos Aires Plan of Action was adopted. The parties also began discussing the post-Kyoto mechanism, on how to allocate emission reduction obligation following 2012, when the first commitment period ends.
