= 2003 United Nations Climate Change Conference =

International climate change conference in Italy

United Nations Climate Change Conference COP9
- Dates: 1 December 2003– 12 December 2003
- Locations: Milan, Italy
- Previous event: ← New Delhi 2002
- Next event: Buenos Aires 2004 →
- Participants: UNFCCC member countries
- Website: Summary by the President of the Conference

The 2003 United Nations Climate Change Conference took place between 1–12 December 2003 in Milan, Italy. The conference included the 9th Conference of the Parties (COP9) to the United Nations Framework Convention on Climate Change (UNFCCC). The parties agreed to use the Adaptation Fund established at COP7 in 2001 primarily in supporting developing countries better adapt to climate change. The fund would also be used for capacity-building through technology transfer. At the conference, the parties also agreed to review the first national reports submitted by 110 non-Annex I countries.
