= Territorial Approach to Climate Change =

The Territorial Approach to Climate Change (TACC) works with local level governments (states, provinces, cities, municipalities) in developing countries and countries in transition to increase resilience to climate change impact and reduce their carbon footprint. The TACC is a partnership of five agencies that includes UNEP, UNDP, UNITAR, UN-Habitat and UNCDF.

TACC as a global action came into existence after the Saint Malo Declaration. Sub-national authorities recognised that urgent and collective action was needed to respond appropriately to climate change.

The United Nations recognised that most investments to reduce Greenhouse gas emissions and adapt to climate change take place at the sub-national and local levels. Developing the capacity of sub-national governments in low income countries to create conditions that reduce the perceived investments risks and access new sources of environmental finance was seen as key to addressing climate change.

Phase 1 of the programme - Awareness raising and training - was led by the United Nations Environment Programme (UNEP).

Phase 2 - Analysis, assessment and action plan - was led by the United Nations Development Programme (UNDP).

Phase 3 - Projects - was also led by the United Nations Development Programme (UNDP).

Initial projects under TACC were conducted in:

- Uganda
- Uruguay (the pilot project)
- Albania
- Algeria
- Colombia
- Ethiopia
- Peru
- Senegal
