= Marrakesh Accords =

International agreement

The Marrakesh Accords is a set of agreements reached at the 7th Conference of the Parties (COP7) to the United Nations Framework Convention on Climate Change, held in 2001, on the rules of meeting the targets set out in the Kyoto Protocol. The separate Marrakesh Declaration of 15 April 1994, manifesting the Uruguay Round trade agreements and establishing the World Trade Organization, was also concluded and signed in Marrakesh, Morocco.
