= United Nations Climate Change Conference =

Annual climate change conferences

United Nations Climate Change Conferences
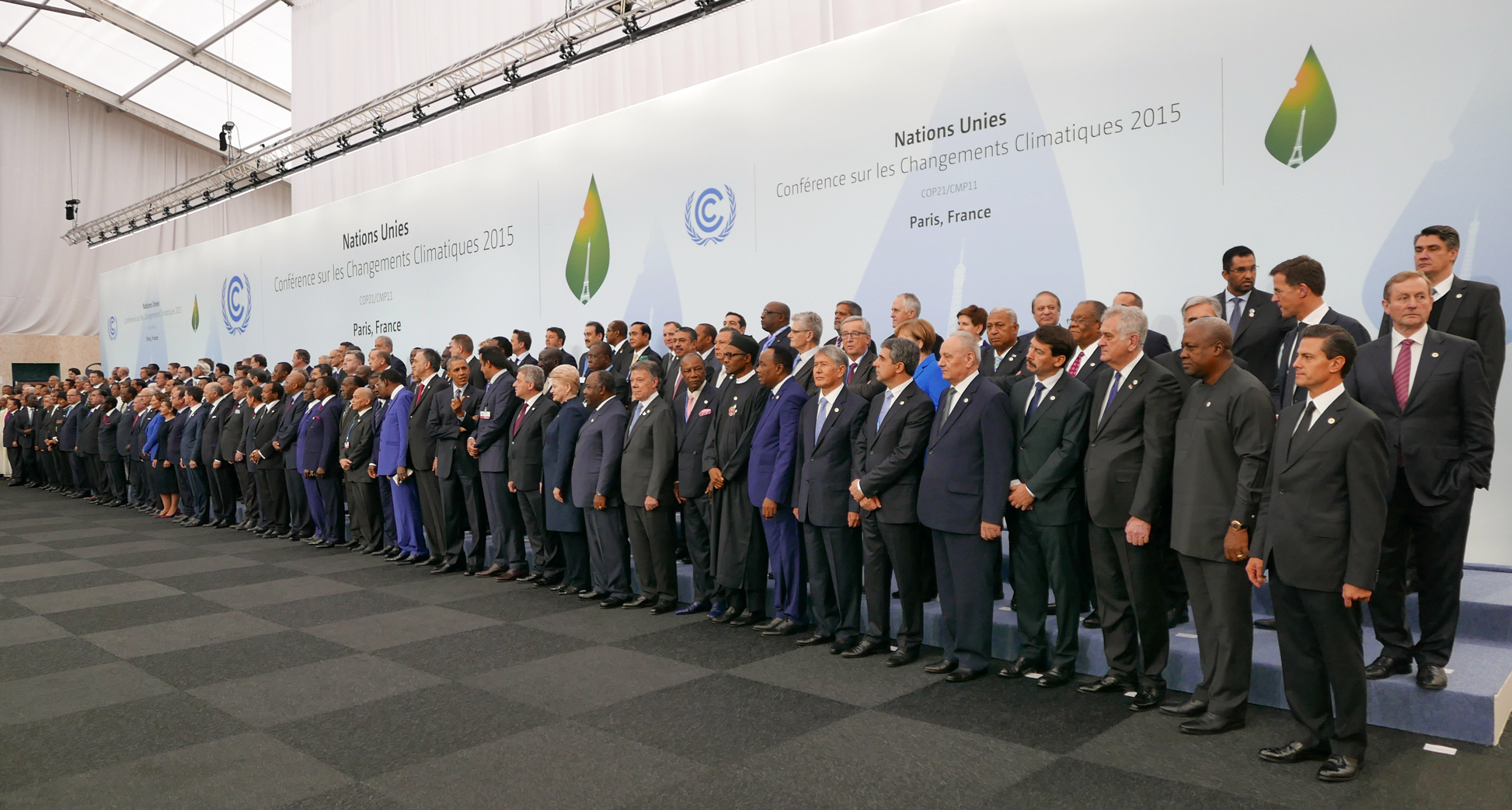
- Heads of delegations at the 2015 United Nations Climate Change Conference, which established the Paris Agreement
- Date: 1995–present
- Organized by: United Nations

The United Nations Climate Change Conferences are yearly conferences held as part of the United Nations Framework Convention on Climate Change (UNFCCC). They serve as the formal meeting of the UNFCCC parties—the conference of the parties (COP)—to assess progress in dealing with climate change, and beginning in the mid-1990s, to negotiate the Kyoto Protocol to establish legally binding obligations for developed countries to reduce their greenhouse gas emissions. Starting in 2005 the conferences have also served as the "Conference of the Parties Serving as the Meeting of Parties to the Kyoto Protocol" (CMP); also parties to the convention that are not parties to the protocol can participate in protocol-related meetings as observers. From 2011 to 2015, the meetings were used to negotiate the Paris Agreement as part of the Durban platform, which created a general path towards climate action. Any final text of a COP must be agreed by consensus.

The first UN Climate Change Conference (COP 1) was held in 1995 in Berlin.

== Role of climate change conferences ==
Member states of the UNFCCC meet annually at the Conference of the Parties (COP) to assess progress in combating climate change. COP provides a platform for governments, NGOs, and the private sector to collaborate and determine strategies for global climate policy and action. These conferences offer an opportunity to discuss climate governance measures, reduce carbon emissions, and promote the transition to more sustainable energy sources.

The UN Climate Change Conferences serve as key forums for shaping global policy, where representatives of various countries jointly address the reduction of global greenhouse gas emissions and support states in enhancing their resilience to climate impacts.

== Rotating principle of the COPs ==
When the member states of the UNFCCC drafted the rules and procedures of the annual conference, they decided the event should rotate between the 5 UN groups. That order being, WEOG - Western European and Other Group, Africa Group, Asia and Pacific Group, Eastern European Group and lastly GRULAC - Group of Latin American and the Caribbean. Ideally, the group nominates a country to host the event and also provide the COP President to chair the meeting. However, there have been years when the group only provided the COP President but the host country was from a different country or group.

This happened in 1996, when the COP President was from Zimbabwe but Switzerland hosted. In 1999, the COP President was from Poland, but Berlin was the COP host city. Also from the Eastern European Group, Hungary provided the COP President, and Milan, Italy was the host venue in 2003. In 2017, Bonn, Germany hosted the COP and Fiji provided the COP Presidency. In 2019, Chile was to host but had to cancel due to civil unrest. They provided the presidency whilst Madrid, Spain ended up being the host venue.

In total, Germany and Poland have been the host country three times each, Morocco and Argentina each twice. 27 cities have hosted COPs, with Bonn, Germany, Buenos Aires, Argentina and Marrakesh, Morocco each hosting twice.

One COP did not close – COP 6 in the Hague, due to disruptions and had to be suspended. An additional session – COP bis, or COP 6.2 was planned in Bonn, Germany the year after to officially close the session. There was only one year that the COP was cancelled – 2020, due to the COVID-19 pandemic.

== List of conferences, presidents and locations ==
Year	Name	Host city, country	COP President	COP Presidency	COP President Regional Groups
1995	COP 1	Berlin, Germany	Angela Merkel	Germany	Western Europe and Other Group
1996	COP 2	Geneva, Switzerland	Chen Chimutengwende	Zimbabwe	Africa Group
1997	COP 3	Kyoto, Japan	Hiroshi Ohki	Japan	Asia and Pacific Group
1998	COP 4	Buenos Aires, Argentina	María Julia Alsogaray	Argentina	Group of Latin America Caribbean
1999	COP 5	Bonn, Germany	Jan Szyszko	Poland	Eastern Europe Group
2000	COP 6	The Hague, Netherlands	Jan Pronk	Netherlands	Western Europe and Other Group
2001	COP 6-2	Bonn, Germany	Jan Pronk	Netherlands	Western Europe and Other Group
2001	COP 7	Marrakesh, Morocco	Mohamed Elyazghi	Morocco	Africa Group
2002	COP 8	New Delhi, India	T. R. Baalu	India	Asia and Pacific Group
2003	COP 9	Milan, Italy	Miklós Persányi	Hungary	Eastern Europe Group
2004	COP 10	Buenos Aires, Argentina	Ginés González García	Argentina	Group of Latin America Caribbean
2005	COP 11	Montreal, Canada	Stéphane Dion	Canada	Western Europe and Other Group
2006	COP 12	Nairobi, Kenya	Kivutha Kibwana	Kenya	Africa Group
2007	COP 13	Bali, Indonesia	Rachmat Witoelar	Indonesia	Asia and Pacific Group
2008	COP 14	Poznań, Poland	Maciej Nowicki	Poland	Eastern Europe Group
2009	COP 15	Copenhagen, Denmark	Connie Hedegaard	Denmark	Western Europe and Other Group
2010	COP 16	Cancún, Mexico	Patricia Espinosa	Mexico	Group of Latin America Caribbean
2011	COP 17	Durban, South Africa	Maite Nkoana-Mashabane	South Africa	Africa Group
2012	COP 18	Doha, Qatar	Abdullah bin Hamad Al-Attiyah	Qatar	Asia and Pacific Group
2013	COP 19	Warsaw, Poland	Marcin Korolec	Poland	Eastern Europe Group
2014	COP 20	Lima, Peru	Manuel Pulgar-Vidal	Peru	Group of Latin America Caribbean
2015	COP 21	Paris, France	Laurent Fabius	France	Western Europe and Other Group
2016	COP 22	Marrakesh, Morocco	Salaheddine Mezouar	Morocco	Africa Group
2017	COP 23	Bonn, Germany	Frank Bainimarama	Fiji	Asia and Pacific Group
2018	COP 24	Katowice, Poland	Michał Kurtyka	Poland	Eastern Europe Group
2019	COP 25	Madrid, Spain	Carolina Schmidt	Chile	Group of Latin America Caribbean
~~2020~~	~~COP 26~~	~~Glasgow, United Kingdom~~	Postponed due to COVID	~~United Kingdom~~	~~Western Europe and Other Group~~
2021	COP 26	Glasgow, United Kingdom	Alok Sharma	United Kingdom	Western Europe and Other Group
2022	COP 27	Sharm El Sheikh, Egypt	Sameh Shoukry	Egypt	Africa Group
2023	COP 28	Dubai, United Arab Emirates	Sultan Al Jaber	United Arab Emirates	Asia and Pacific Group
2024	COP 29	Baku, Azerbaijan	Mukhtar Babayev,	Azerbaijan	Eastern Europe Group
2025	COP 30	Belém, Brazil	André Corrêa do Lago	Brazil	Group of Latin America Caribbean
2026	COP 31	Antalya, Turkey	Murat Kurum	Turkey	Western Europe and Other Group
2027	COP 32	Addis Ababa, Ethiopia	Gedion Timothewos	Ethiopia	Africa Group
2028	COP 33	to be determined	to be determined	to be determined	Asia and Pacific Group

== 1995: COP 1, Berlin, Germany ==
The first UNFCCC Conference of the Parties took place from 28 March to 7 April 1995 in Berlin, Germany. Delegates from 117 Parties and 53 Observer States attended the conference. One of the central issues of COP 1 was the adequacy of individual country commitments, resulting in a mandate to begin a process toward individual country action for the period beyond 2000. This included strengthening the commitments of Annex I Parties in Article 4.2(a) and (b).

Delegates also established: a pilot phase for Joint Implementation projects; an agreement that the Permanent Secretariat should be located in Bonn, Germany; and the Subsidiary Bodies. Conference delegates did not reach consensus on the Rules of Procedures, and a decision on voting rules was deferred to COP 2.

== 1996: COP 2, Geneva, Switzerland ==
COP 2 took place from 8–19 July 1996 in Geneva, Switzerland. Its ministerial declaration was noted (but not adopted) on 18 July 1996, and reflected a United States position statement presented by Timothy Wirth, former Under Secretary for Global Affairs for the United States Department of State at that meeting, which:

1. Accepted the scientific findings on climate change proffered by the Intergovernmental Panel on Climate Change (IPCC) in its second assessment (1995);
2. Rejected uniform "harmonized policies" in favor of flexibility;
3. Called for "legally binding mid-term targets".

== 1997: COP 3, Kyoto, Japan ==
COP 3 took place on 1–11 December 1997 in Kyoto, Japan. After intensive negotiations, it adopted the Kyoto Protocol, which outlined the greenhouse gas emissions reduction obligation for Annex I countries, along with what came to be known as Kyoto mechanisms such as emissions trading, clean development mechanism and joint implementation. In a separate decision of the Conference of Parties, countries agreed to a range of national security exemptions which stated that bunker fuels and emissions from multilateral military operations would not be part of national emissions totals and would be reported outside of those totals. Most industrialised countries and some central European economies in transition (all defined as Annex B countries) agreed to legally binding reductions in greenhouse gas emissions of an average of 6 to 8% below 1990 levels between the years 2008–2012, defined as the first emissions budget period. The United States would be required to reduce its total emissions an average of 7% below 1990 levels; however, Congress did not ratify the treaty after Clinton signed it. The Bush administration explicitly rejected the protocol in 2001.

== 1998: COP 4, Buenos Aires, Argentina ==
COP 4 took place on 2–14 November 1998 in Buenos Aires, Argentina. It had been expected that the remaining issues unresolved in Kyoto would be finalised at this meeting. However, the complexity and difficulty of finding agreement on these issues proved insurmountable, and instead the parties adopted a two-year "Buenos Aires Plan of Action" (BAPA) to advance efforts and to devise mechanisms for implementing the Kyoto Protocol, to be completed by 2000. During COP 4, Argentina and Kazakhstan expressed their commitment to take on the greenhouse gas emissions reduction obligation, the first two non-Annex countries to do so.

== 1999: COP 5, Bonn, Germany ==
COP 5 took place between 25 October and 5 November 1999, in Bonn, Germany. It was primarily a technical meeting, and did not reach major conclusions. 165 Parties were represented at the conference. Conference delegates continued their work toward fulfilling the Buenos Aires Plan of Action (BAPA) adopted at COP 4. In the last two days of the Conference, COP 5 adopted 32 draft decisions and conclusions related to the review of the implementation of commitments. Despite reaching no major conclusions, COP-5 served as an important "intermediate step" laying out the difficult path to finalizing the Kyoto Protocol at COP-6.

== 2000: COP 6, The Hague, Netherlands ==
COP 6 took place on 13–25 November 2000, in The Hague, Netherlands. Many in the international community and domestic environmental groups saw this meeting as a chance to finalize a Protocol that could secure ratification. Specifically, COP-6 was intended to complete work on the two-year Buenos Aires Plan of Action (BAPA), agreed upon at COP-4. However, these groups saw the United States as a roadblock to finalise such a Protocol. The discussions evolved rapidly into a high-level negotiation over the major political issues. These included major controversy over the United States' proposal to allow credit for carbon "sinks" in forests and agricultural lands that would satisfy a major proportion of the US emissions reductions in this way; disagreements over consequences for non-compliance by countries that did not meet their emission reduction targets; and difficulties in resolving how developing countries could obtain financial assistance to deal with adverse effects of climate change and meet their obligations to plan for measuring and possibly reducing greenhouse gas emissions.

In the final hours of COP 6, despite some compromises agreed between the United States and some EU countries, notably the United Kingdom, the EU countries as a whole, led by Denmark and Germany, rejected the compromise positions, and the talks in The Hague collapsed. Jan Pronk, the President of COP 6, suspended COP 6 without agreement, with the expectation that negotiations would later resume. It was later announced that the COP 6 meetings (termed "COP 6 bis") would be resumed in Bonn, Germany, in the second half of July. The next regularly scheduled meeting of the parties to the UNFCCC, COP 7, had been set for Marrakesh, Morocco, in October–November 2001.

== 2001: COP 6-2, Bonn, Germany ==
COP 6 negotiations resumed on 16–27 July 2001, in Bonn, Germany, with little progress having been made in resolving the differences that had produced an impasse in The Hague. However, this meeting took place after George W. Bush had become the President of the United States and had rejected the Kyoto Protocol in March 2001; as a result the United States delegation to this meeting declined to participate in the negotiations related to the Protocol and chose to take the role of observer at the meeting. As the other parties negotiated the key issues, agreement was reached on most of the major political issues, to the surprise of most observers, given the low expectations that preceded the meeting. The agreements included:

1. Flexible mechanisms: The "flexibility mechanisms" which the United States had strongly favored when the Protocol was initially put together, including emissions trading, joint implementation (JI), and the Clean Development Mechanism (CDM) which allows industrialised countries to fund emissions reduction activities in developing countries as an alternative to domestic emission reductions. One of the key elements of this agreement was that there would be no quantitative limit on the credit a country could claim from use of these mechanisms provided domestic action constituted a significant element of the efforts of each Annex B country to meet their targets.
2. Carbon sinks: It was agreed that credit would be granted for broad activities that absorb carbon from the atmosphere or store it, including forest and cropland management, and re-vegetation, with no over-all cap on the amount of credit that a country could claim for sinks activities. In the case of forest management, an Appendix Z establishes country-specific caps for each Annex I country. Thus, a cap of 13 million tons could be credited to Japan (which represents about 4% of its base-year emissions). For cropland management, countries could receive credit only for carbon sequestration increases above 1990 levels.
3. Compliance: Final action on compliance procedures and mechanisms that would address non-compliance with Protocol provisions was deferred to COP 7, but included broad outlines of consequences for failing to meet emissions targets that would include a requirement to "make up" shortfalls at 1.3 tons to 1, suspension of the right to sell credits for surplus emissions reductions, and a required compliance action plan for those not meeting their targets.
4. Financing: There was agreement on the establishment of three new funds to provide assistance for needs associated with climate change: (1) a fund for climate change that supports a series of climate measures; (2) a least-developed-country fund to support National Adaptation Programs of Action; and (3) a Kyoto Protocol adaptation fund supported by a CDM levy and voluntary contributions.

A number of operational details attendant upon these decisions remained to be negotiated and agreed upon, and these were the major issues considered by the COP 7 meeting that followed.

== 2001: COP 7, Marrakesh, Morocco ==
At the COP 7 meeting in Marrakesh, Morocco, from 29 October to 10 November 2001, negotiators wrapped up the work on the Buenos Aires Plan of Action, finalizing most of the operational details and setting the stage for nations to ratify the Kyoto Protocol. The completed package of decisions is known as the Marrakesh Accords. The United States delegation maintained its observer role, declining to participate actively in the negotiations. Other parties continued to express hope that the United States would re-engage in the process at some point and worked to achieve ratification of the Kyoto Protocol by the requisite number of countries to bring it into force (55 countries needed to ratify it, including those accounting for 55% of developed-country emissions of carbon dioxide in 1990). The date of the World Summit on Sustainable Development (August–September 2002) was put forward as a target to bring the Kyoto Protocol into force. The World Summit on Sustainable Development (WSSD) was to be held in Johannesburg, South Africa.

The main decisions at COP 7 included:

- Operational rules for international emissions trading among parties to the Protocol and for the CDM and joint implementation;
- A compliance regime that outlined consequences for failure to meet emissions targets but deferred to the parties to the Protocol, once it came into force, the decision on whether those consequences would be legally binding;
- Accounting procedures for the flexibility mechanisms;
- A decision to consider at COP 8 how to achieve a review of the adequacy of commitments that might lead to discussions on future commitments by developing countries.

== 2002: COP 8, New Delhi, India ==
Taking place from 23 October to 1 November 2002, in New Delhi COP 8 adopted the Delhi Ministerial Declaration that, amongst others, called for efforts by developed countries to transfer technology and minimise the impact of climate change on developing countries. It is also approved the New Delhi work programme on Article 6 of the Convention. The COP 8 was marked by Russia's hesitation, stating that it needed more time to think it over. The Kyoto Protocol could enter into force once it was ratified by 55 countries, including countries responsible for 55 per cent of the developed world's 1990 carbon dioxide emissions. With the United States (36.1 per cent share of developed-world carbon dioxide) and Australia refusing ratification, Russia's agreement (17% of global emissions in 1990) was required to meet the ratification criteria and therefore Russia could delay the process.

== 2003: COP 9, Milan, Italy ==
COP 9 took place on 1–12 December 2003 in Milan, Italy. The parties agreed to use the Adaptation Fund established at COP 7 in 2001 primarily in supporting developing countries better adapt to climate change. The fund would also be used for capacity-building through technology transfer. At COP 9, the parties also agreed to review the first national reports submitted by 110 non-Annex I countries.

== 2004: COP 10, Buenos Aires, Argentina ==
COP 10 took place on 6–17 December 2004. COP 10 discussed the progress made since the first Conference of the Parties 10 years ago and its future challenges, with special emphasis on climate change mitigation and adaptation. To promote developing countries better adapt to climate change, the Buenos Aires Plan of Action was adopted. The parties also began discussing the post-Kyoto mechanism, on how to allocate emission reduction obligation following 2012, when the first commitment period ends.

== 2005: COP 11/CMP 1, Montreal, Canada ==
COP 11/CMP 1 took place between 28 November and 9 December 2005, in Montreal, Quebec, Canada. It was the first Conference of the Parties serving as the Meeting of the Parties to the Kyoto Protocol (CMP 1) since their initial meeting in Kyoto in 1997. It was one of the largest intergovernmental conferences on climate change ever. The event marked the entry into force of the Kyoto Protocol. Hosting more than 10000 delegates, it was one of Canada's largest international events ever and the largest gathering in Montreal since Expo 67. The Montreal Action Plan was an agreement to "extend the life of the Kyoto Protocol beyond its 2012 expiration date and negotiate deeper cuts in greenhouse-gas emissions". COP President and Canada's environment minister at the time, Stéphane Dion, said the agreement provides a "map for the future". Delegates of the COP also paid their respect to UNFCCC Executive Secretary, Joke Waller-Hunter who had passed away just 2 months before the conference.

== 2006: COP 12/CMP 2, Nairobi, Kenya ==
COP 12/CMP 2 took place on 6–17 November 2006 in Nairobi, Kenya. At the meeting, BBC reporter Richard Black coined the phrase "climate tourists" to describe some delegates who attended "to see Africa, take snaps of the wildlife, the poor, dying African children and women". Black also noted that due to delegates concerns over economic costs and possible losses of competitiveness, the majority of the discussions avoided any mention of reducing emissions. Black concluded that was a disconnect between the political process and the scientific imperative. Despite such criticism, certain strides were made at COP12, including in the areas of support for developing countries and clean development mechanism. The parties adopted a five-year plan of work to support climate change adaptation by developing countries, and agreed on the procedures and modalities for the Adaptation Fund. They also agreed to improve the projects for clean development mechanism.

== 2007: COP 13/CMP 3, Bali, Indonesia ==
COP 13/CMP 3 took place on 3–15 December 2007, at Nusa Dua, in Bali, Indonesia. Agreement on a timeline and structured negotiation on the post-2012 framework (the end of the first commitment period of the Kyoto Protocol) was achieved with the adoption of the Bali Action Plan (Decision 1/CP.13). The Ad Hoc Working Group on Long-term Cooperative Action under the Convention (AWG-LCA) was established as a new subsidiary body to conduct the negotiations aimed at urgently enhancing the implementation of the Convention up to and beyond 2012. Decision 9/CP.13 is an Amended to the New Delhi work programme. These negotiations took place during 2008 (leading to COP 14/CMP 4 in Poznan, Poland) and 2009 (leading to COP 15/CMP 5 in Copenhagen).

== 2008: COP 14/CMP 4, Poznań, Poland ==
COP 14/CMP 4 took place on 1–12 December 2008 in Poznań, Poland. Delegates agreed on principles for the financing of a fund to help the poorest nations cope with the effects of climate change and they approved a mechanism to incorporate forest protection into the efforts of the international community to combat climate change.

Negotiations on a successor to the Kyoto Protocol were the primary focus of the conference.

== 2009: COP 15/CMP 5, Copenhagen, Denmark ==
COP 15 took place in Copenhagen, Denmark, on 7–18 December 2009. The overall goal for the COP 15/CMP 5 United Nations Climate Change Conference in Denmark was to establish an ambitious global climate agreement for the period from 2012 when the first commitment period under the Kyoto Protocol expires. However, on 14 November 2009, The New York Times announced that "President Obama and other world leaders have decided to put off the difficult task of reaching a climate change agreement... agreeing instead to make it the mission of the Copenhagen conference to reach a less specific "politically binding" agreement that would punt the most difficult issues into the future". Ministers and officials from 192 countries took part in the Copenhagen meeting and in addition there were participants from a large number of civil society organisations. As many Annex 1 industrialised countries are now reluctant to fulfil commitments under the Kyoto Protocol, a large part of the diplomatic work that lays the foundation for a post-Kyoto agreement was undertaken up to the COP 15.

The conference did not achieve a binding agreement for long-term action. A 12-paragraph 'political accord' was negotiated by approximately 25 parties including US and China, but it was only 'noted' by the COP as it is considered an external document, not negotiated within the UNFCCC process. The accord was notable in that it referred to a collective commitment by developed countries for new and additional resources, including forestry and investments through international institutions, that will approach US$30 billion for the period 2010–2012. Longer-term options on climate financing mentioned in the accord are being discussed within the UN Secretary General's High Level Advisory Group on Climate Financing, which is due to report in November 2010. The negotiations on extending the Kyoto Protocol had unresolved issues as did the negotiations on a framework for long-term cooperative action. The working groups on these tracks to the negotiations are now due to report to COP 16 and CMP 6 in Mexico.

== 2010: COP 16/CMP 6, Cancún, Mexico ==
COP 16 was held in Cancún, Mexico, from 28 November to 10 December 2010.

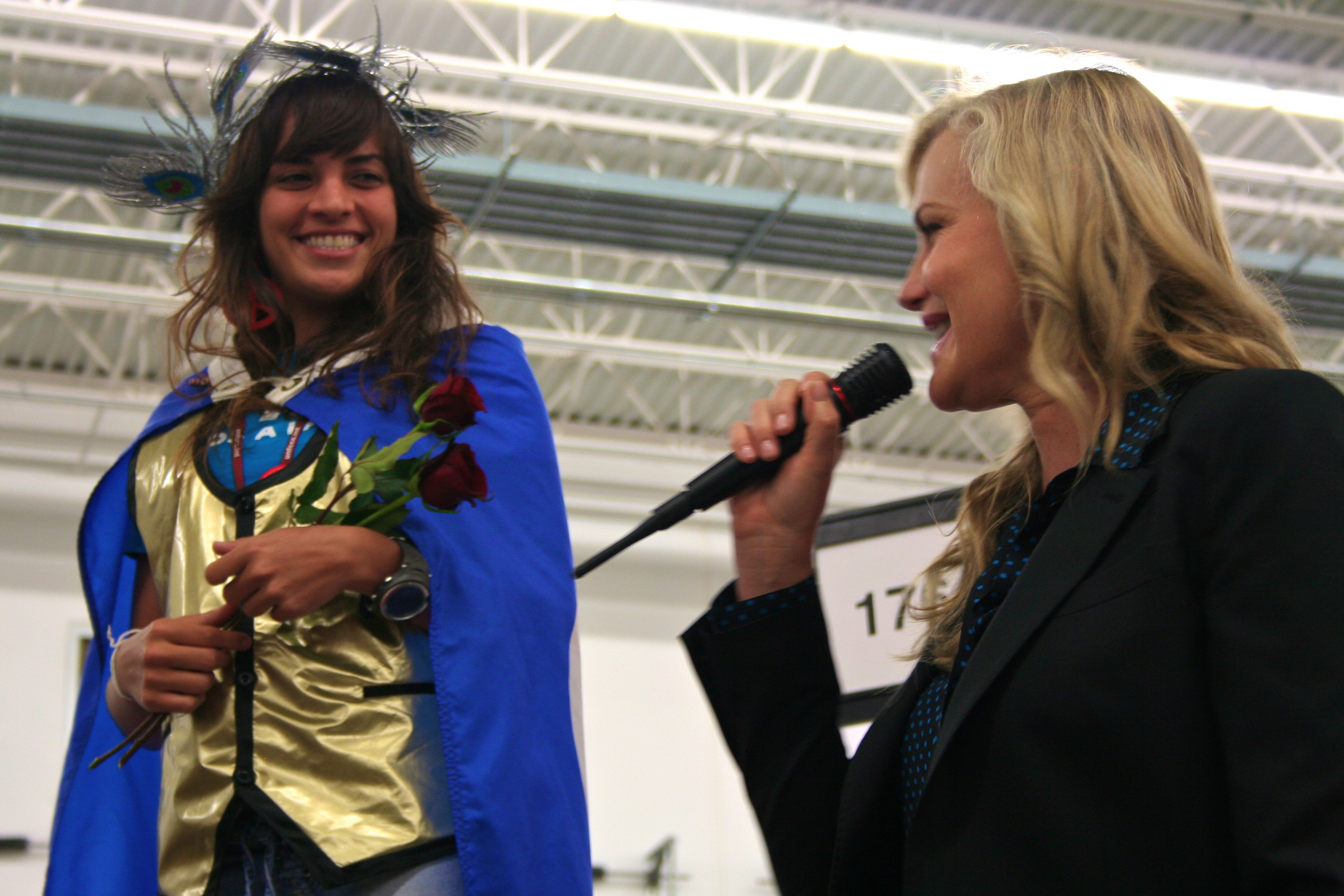
Daryl Hannah at COP 16 Cancun, Mexico.

The outcome of the summit was an agreement adopted by the states' parties that called for the US$100 billion per annum "Green Climate Fund", and a "Climate Technology Centre" and network. However, the funding of the Green Climate Fund was not agreed upon. Nor was a commitment to a second period of the Kyoto Protocol agreed upon, but it was concluded that the base year shall be 1990 and the global warming potentials shall be those provided by the IPCC.

All parties "Recognizing that climate change represents an urgent and potentially irreversible threat to human societies and the planet, and thus requires to be urgently addressed by all Parties". It recognises the IPCC Fourth Assessment Report goal of a maximum 2 °C global warming and all parties should take urgent action to meet this goal. It also agreed upon greenhouse gas emissions should peak as soon as possible, but recognising that the time frame for peaking will be longer in developing countries, since social and economic development and poverty eradication are the first and overriding priorities of developing countries.

== 2011: COP 17/CMP 7, Durban, South Africa ==
The 2011 COP 17 was held in Durban, South Africa, from 28 November to 9 December 2011.

The conference agreed to a start negotiations on a legally binding deal comprising all countries, to be adopted in 2015, governing the period post 2020. There was also progress regarding the creation of a Green Climate Fund (GCF) for which a management framework was adopted. The fund is to distribute US$100 billion per year to help poor countries adapt to climate impacts.

While the COP President, Maite Nkoana-Mashabane, declared it a success, scientists and environmental groups warned that the deal was not sufficient to avoid global warming beyond 2 °C as more urgent action is needed.

== 2012: COP 18/CMP 8, Doha, Qatar ==
Qatar hosted COP 18 which took place in Doha, Qatar, from 26 November to 7 December 2012. The Conference produced a package of documents collectively titled The Doha Climate Gateway. The documents collectively contained:

1. The Doha Amendment to the Kyoto Protocol (to be accepted before entering into force) featuring a second commitment period running from 2012 until 2020 limited in scope to 15% of the global carbon dioxide emissions due to the lack of commitments of Japan, Russia, Belarus, Ukraine, New Zealand (nor the United States and Canada, who are not parties to the Protocol in that period) and due to the fact that developing countries like China (the world's largest emitter), India and Brazil are not subject to emissions reductions under the Kyoto Protocol.
2. Language on loss and damage, formalised for the first time in the conference documents.

The conference made little progress towards the funding of the Green Climate Fund.

Russia, Belarus and Ukraine objected at the end of the session, as they had a right to under the session's rules. In closing the conference, the President said that he would note these objections in his final report.

== 2013: COP 19/CMP 9, Warsaw, Poland ==
COP 19 was the 19th yearly session of the Conference of the Parties (COP) to the 1992 United Nations Framework Convention on Climate Change (UNFCCC) and the 9th session of the Meeting of the Parties (CMP) to the 1997 Kyoto Protocol (the protocol having been developed under the UNFCCC's charter). The conference was held in Warsaw, Poland from 11 to 23 November 2013. The most prominent result was the adoption of the Warsaw Framework on REDD-plus.

The Conference also established the Warsaw International Mechanism (WIM) for Loss and Damage associated with Climate Change Impacts (Loss and Damage Mechanism), to address loss and damage associated with impacts of climate change. This included extreme events and slow onset events, in developing countries that are particularly vulnerable to the adverse effects of climate change.

== 2014: COP 20/CMP 10, Lima, Peru ==
On 1–12 December 2014, Lima, Peru, hosted the 20th yearly session of the Conference of the Parties (COP) to the 1992 United Nations Framework Convention on Climate Change (UNFCCC) and the 10th session of the Meeting of the Parties (CMP) to the 1997 Kyoto Protocol (the protocol having been developed under the UNFCCC's charter). The pre-COP conference was held in Venezuela.

== 2015: COP 21/CMP 11, Paris, France ==
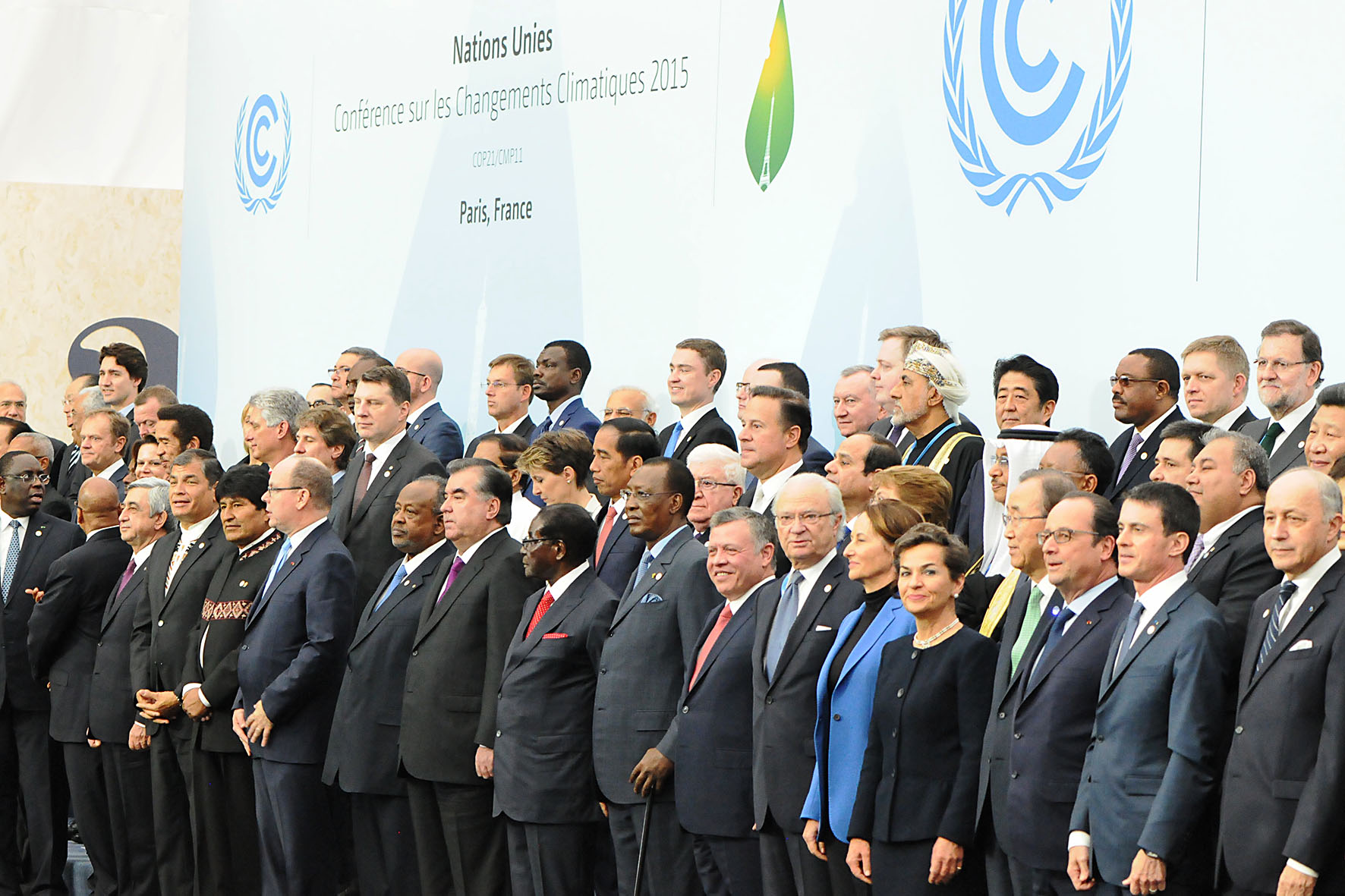
Family photo during Leader Event of COP 21

The COP 21 was held in Paris from 30 November to 12 December 2015. Negotiations resulted in the adoption of the Paris Agreement on 12 December, governing climate change reduction measures from 2020. The adoption of this agreement ended the work of the Durban platform, established during COP 17. The agreement entered into force (and thus become fully effective) on 4 November 2016. On 4 October 2016 the threshold for adoption was reached with over 55 countries representing at least 55% of the world's greenhouse gas emissions ratifying the Agreement.

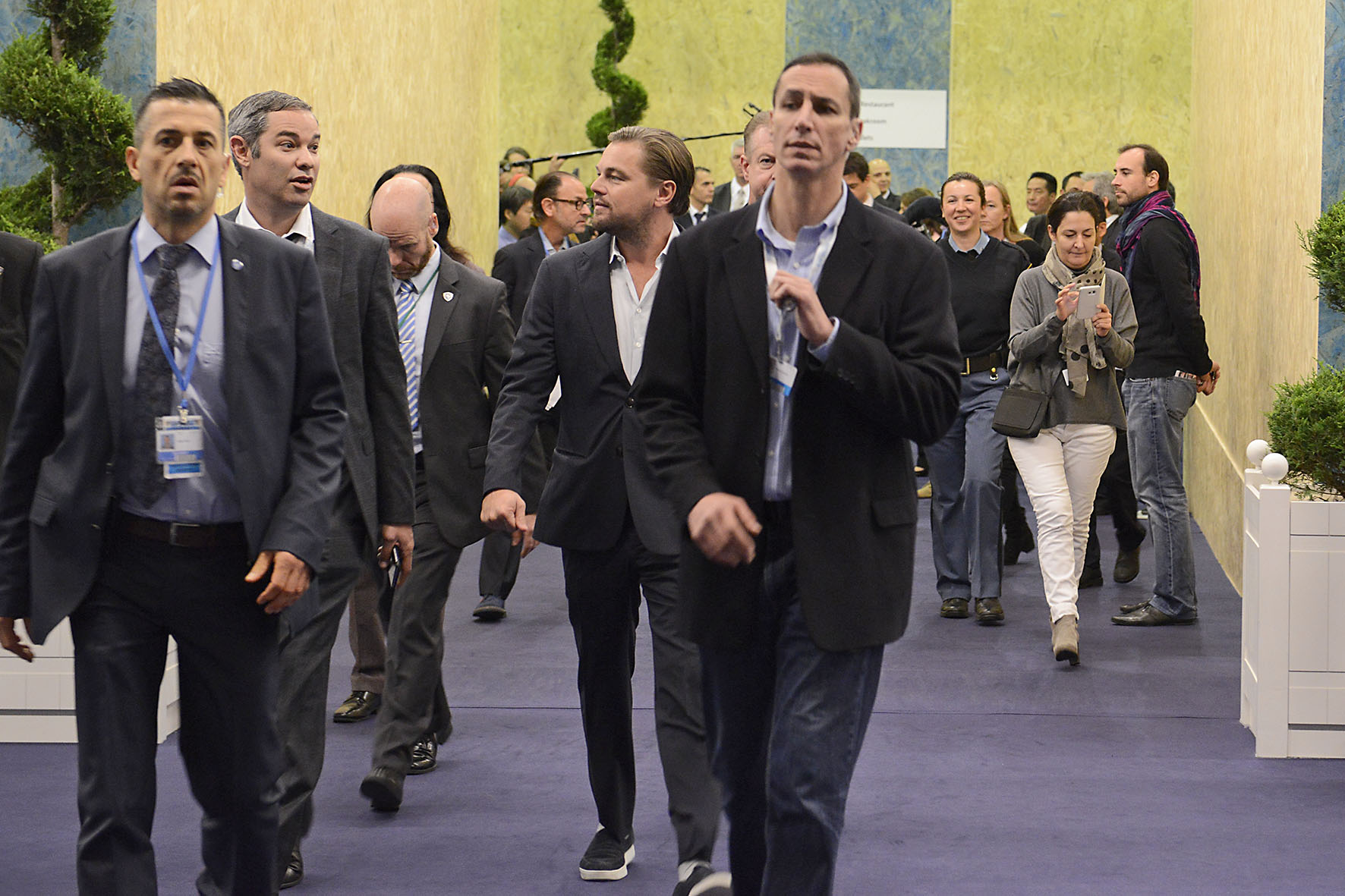
Leonardo di Caprio at COP 21 in Paris

== 2016: COP 22/CMP 12/CMA 1, Marrakesh, Morocco ==
COP 22 was held in Marrakesh, in the North African country of Morocco, on 7–18 November 2016. A focal issue of COP 22 is that of water scarcity, water cleanliness, and water-related sustainability, a major problem in the developing world, including many African states. Prior to the event a special initiative on water was presided by Charafat Afailal, Morocco's Minister in Charge of Water and Aziz Mekouar, COP 22 Ambassador for Multilateral Negotiations. Another focal issue was the need to reduce greenhouse emissions and utilise low-carbon energy sources. Peter Thomson, President of the UN General Assembly, called for the transformation of the global economy in all sectors to achieve a low emissions global economy.

== 2017: COP 23/CMP 13/CMA 1.2, Bonn, Germany ==
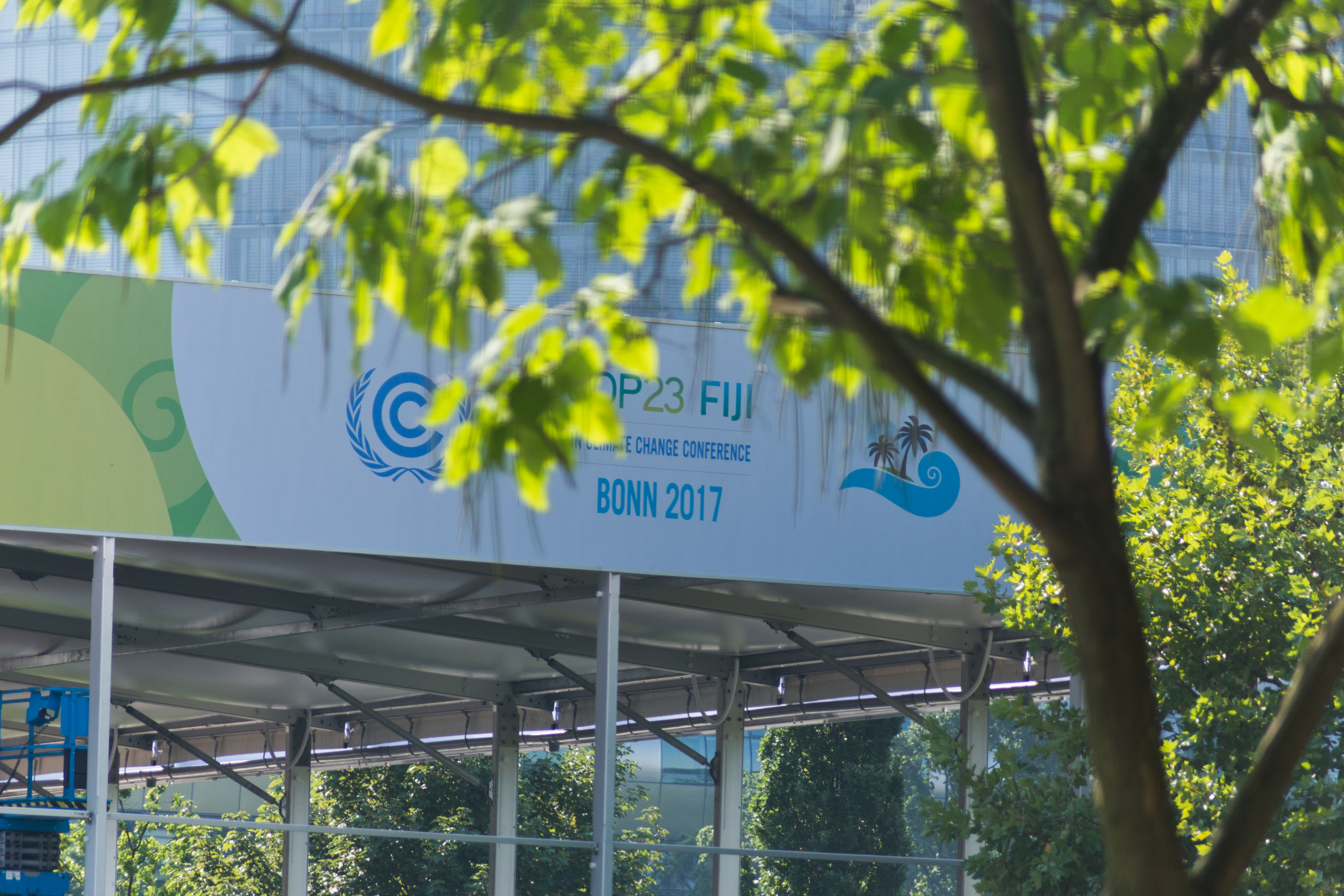
UN Campus, Bonn

COP 23 was held on 6–17 November 2017. On Friday, 18 November 2016, the end of COP 22, the Chairperson of COP 23 from Fiji announced that it would be held in Bonn, Germany. (COP 23/CMP 13). Fijian Prime Minister and incoming President of COP 23, Frank Bainimarama, on 13 April launched the logo for this year's United Nations Climate Change Conference, to be held at UN Campus, Bonn in November. This conference saw the launch of the Powering Past Coal Alliance.

== 2018: COP 24/CMP 14/CMA 1.3, Katowice, Poland ==
COP 24 was held on 3–14 December 2018 in Katowice, Poland.

The Polish government's vision for presidency states that the organisation of COP 24 will provide an opportunity for convincing other countries that Poland does not hamper the process of tackling dangerous climate change and that Poland is one of the leaders of this process.

== 2019: COP 25/CMP 15/CMA 2, Madrid, Spain ==
The 25th session of the Conference of the Parties (COP 25) to the UNFCCC was planned to take place from 11 to 22 November 2019 in Brazil. Upon election as President of Brazil, Jair Bolsonaro withdrew Brazil from hosting the event.

COP 25 was then planned to take place in Parque Bicentenario Cerrillos in Santiago de Chile, Chile from 2 to 13 December with a pre-sessional period from 26 November to 1 December 2019 with up to 25000 delegates scheduled to attend. However, following the 2019 Chilean protests, Chilean President Sebastián Piñera announced Chile's withdrawal from hosting the summit in late October 2019. UN Climate Change Executive Secretary Patricia Espinosa stated that organisers were "exploring alternative hosting options". Then Spain offered, and was appointed, as the new host.

== 2020: UN Climate Change Dialogues (Climate Dialogues) ==
Due to the COVID-19 pandemic, COP 26 was postponed. In June, the regular SBs were also postponed and instead the June Momentum for Climate Change took place – which was an online event. Building on its success and coupled with the global lockdowns, COP 26 was also transformed into an online event only. The meeting was not called a COP, but rather "dialogues".

== 2021: COP 26/CMP 16/CMA 3, Glasgow, United Kingdom ==
COP 26 was originally scheduled to take place from 9 to 19 November 2020, in Glasgow, Scotland, United Kingdom, but was postponed to 31 October to 12 November 2021 due to the COVID-19 pandemic. Among other things, this conference led to the development of the Accelerating to Zero coalition to accelerate the phase-out of fossil fuel vehicles, and the Glasgow Climate Pact to "phase down" the use of coal-fired power stations.

== 2022: COP 27/CMP 17/CMA 4, Sharm El Sheikh, Egypt ==
COP 27 was originally expected to take place in November 2021, but was moved to 2022 due to the rescheduling of COP 26 from 2020 to 2021. It took place in Sharm El Sheikh, Egypt. It led to an agreement on loss and damage, under which rich countries could compensate poor countries for damage caused by climate change.

== 2023: COP 28/CMP 18/CMA 5, Dubai, UAE ==
COP28 took place at Expo City Dubai, in the United Arab Emirates, from 30 November to 12 December 2023.

In advance to the conference, Pope Francis issued an apostolic exhortation called Laudate Deum in which he called for brisk action against the climate crisis and condemned climate change denial. At the beginning of November 2023, the Pope announced he would attend the conference and would stay there for three days, but he had to cancel his trip due to health issues.

To date, COP 28 has been the largest COP with local organisers stating 100,000 delegates had entered the premises. The UNFCCC stated that 85,000 participants had been registered. Charles III, King of the United Kingdom, gave the opening address at the summit, his first speech on the climate crisis since becoming monarch. United States president Joe Biden did not attend, with the Gaza war and internal US government spending difficulties being cited as possible causes. Kamala Harris, the Vice President attended instead. Political dignitaries included Sheikh Mohamed bin Zayed – President of the UAE, Emmanuel Macron – President of France, Olaf Scholz – Chancellor of Germany, Fumio Kishida – Prime Minister of Japan, Luiz Inácio Lula da Silva – President of Brazil, Narendra Modi – Prime Minister of India and Ursula von der Leyen – President of the European Commission. Other notable dignitaries included Bill Gates – Philanthropist and Microsoft co-founder, Michael Bloomberg – Former NYC Mayor and climate philanthropist, Larry Fink – CEO of BlackRock, Dr. Tedros Adhanom Ghebreyesus – WHO Director-General, Rafael Grossi – IAEA Director-General, His Serene Highness Prince Albert II, Sovereign Prince of the Principality of Monaco, Jordan’s King Abdullah II,and King Charles III – United Kingdom.

== 2024: COP 29/CMP 19/CMA 6, Baku, Azerbaijan ==
The Czech Republic announced it was considering entering a bid to host the conference. Bulgaria also expressed its desire to host COP 29, with President Rumen Radev presenting Bulgaria's candidacy to host in 2024. During the Bonn Climate Change meeting in May 2023, Azerbaijan and Armenia also announced their interest in hosting COP 29. The Eastern Europe Group had difficulties in identifying a potential host due to the Russian invasion of Ukraine.

Bulgaria and Armenia dropped their bids to host COP29 leading to Azerbaijan being the sole host bid in Baku. The decision to host COP29 in Azerbaijan was criticised by human rights activists and political analysts due to Azerbaijan's human rights abuses and the country's reliance on fossil fuels.

The first time this globally significant annual event has been hosted in a post-Soviet country. Also for the first time since the Taliban takeover in 2021, a delegation from Afghanistan has been invited to the United Nations signature climate conference.

The conference concluded with an agreement on plans for finance to mitigate the effects of climate change and help developing nations transition to more sustainable energy sources. Rules and a UN registry were agreed to facilitate and record international trading of carbon credits.

== 2025: COP 30/CMP 20/CMA 7, Belém, Brazil ==
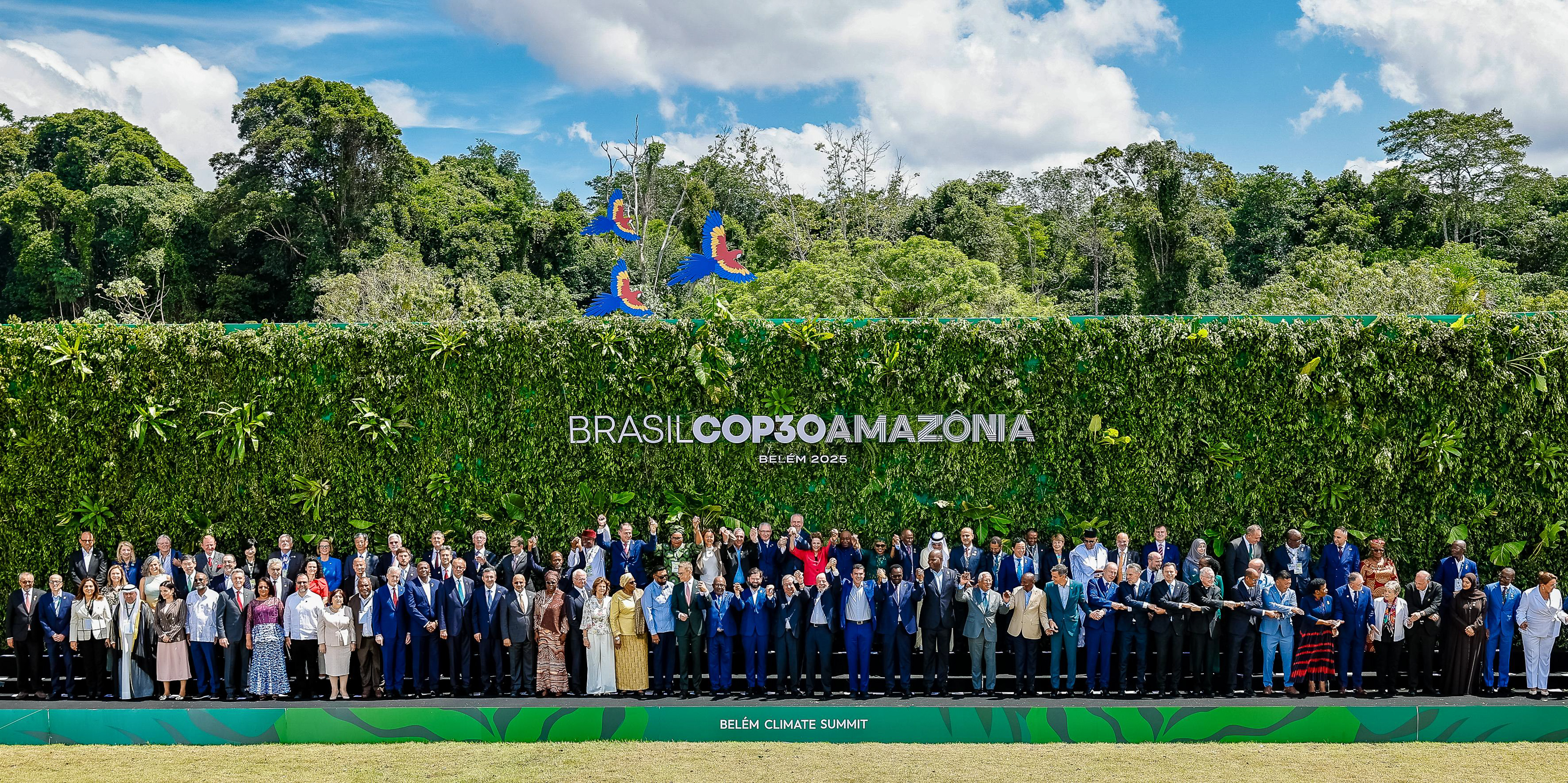
Family photo during Belém Climate Summit, the day before the official COP30 opening.

In 2022, during his statement at COP 27, president-elect Lula said he would seek to make Brazil the host of COP 30 in 2025 and would aim to put the venue in one of the country's Amazon states (most of them in the north region), rather than the more populous coastal region. That would be the first time that Brazil, which is home to 60% of the Amazon rainforest, the world's largest intact forest, hosts the event. On 11 January 2023, President Lula and the Ministry of Foreign Affairs announced the city of Belém in the state of Pará as the Brazil's candidate host city of the event. On 26 May 2023, it was claimed that a UN Latin America regional group endorsed the city chosen to host the COP 30, a first for a city in the Amazon region.

Belém was officially chosen as the COP 30 host during the COP 28 in Dubai on 11 December 2023.

== 2026: COP 31/CMP 21/CMA 8, Antalya, Turkey ==
The Western European and Others Group is to provide the COP presidency for COP 31, with any offers to host it required to be approved by the Group before being presented and approved at COP 30. In the event of failure, hosting would default to Bonn in Germany.

In 2022, Australia announced plans to bid to host COP 31 along with its Pacific island neighbours, and discussed this at the Pacific Islands Forum. The bid had strong public support from other members in the group such as the US, UK, France, Germany, New Zealand, Switzerland, and Canada. Adelaide, South Australia, was chosen as the city to bid for hosting rights. Also in 2022, Turkey's Minister of Environment, Urbanization and Climate Change Murat Kurum declared his country's candidacy to host COP 31.

Australia and Turkey continued to be locked in negotiations about hosting rights until the last days of COP 30 in November 2025, which was attended by Australian Minister for Climate Change and Energy Chris Bowen. On 20 November 2025, it was announced that Turkey would be hosting the conference, but with Bowen acting as leader of negotiations, and an event held immediately before COP 31 hosted by a Pacific nation.

== 2027: COP 32/CMP 22/CMA 9, Addis Ababa, Ethiopia ==
The African Group of countries will provide the COP presidency for COP 32. In November 2025, it was announced that Ethiopia had secured the endorsement of the African Group to host the COP in 2027.

The themes for the "roads to COP 32" are:

1. African Leadership and "Solutions" Narrative
2. Climate Finance: From "Pledges to Delivery"
3. Adaptation and Loss & Damage
4. The "Human-Centered" Energy Transition

== 2028: COP 33/CMP 23/CMA 10 ==
The Asia and Pacific Group will provide the COP presidency for COP 33.

== Accreditation process for NGO participation in UN Climate Change Conferences ==
NGOs wishing to participate in UN Climate Change Conferences as observers must undergo an accreditation process, which consists of several steps. Once an organisation applies for accreditation, they are first vetted. If they are positively assessed and accredited, organisations can then nominate representatives by registering them to attend COPs. Once representatives are registered successfully, they can then be permitted to enter the venue premises, participate in the negotiation process and actively engage in conference sessions and discussions.

Organisations must apply before the set deadlines to ensure a proper participation process. For each conference, organisations need to register participants anew and reconfirm their data. Accredited organisations do not need to repeat the accreditation process, but they must register their representatives for each UNFCCC meeting they wish to attend. The registration process is conducted through the Online Registration System.

== Fossil fuel lobbyists ==
Thousands of lobbyists of the fossil fuel industry have attended the COP conferences, in addition to industry lobbyists sent as part of states' official delegations and lobbyists of other industries with vested interests in petrochemicals extraction. More than 5,350 lobbyists representing Big Oil and other fossil fuel industry players have participated over the four annual UN conferences from 2021 to 2024.

== See also ==
- United Nations Framework Convention on Climate Change
- Action for Climate Empowerment
- Global Climate Action Summit
- 2019 UN Climate Action Summit
- Conference of the parties
- Criticism of the 2026 United Nations Climate Change Conference
