= 2002 United Nations Climate Change Conference =

International climate change conference in India

2002 United Nations Climate Change Conference COP8
- 2002 United Nations Climate Change Conference
- Dates: 23 October 2002– 1 November 2002
- Locations: New Delhi, India
- Previous event: ← Marrakech 2001
- Next event: Milan 2003 →
- Participants: UNFCCC member countries
- Website: The Delhi Ministerial Declaration

The 2002 United Nations Climate Change Conference took place from 23 October – 1 November 2002, in New Delhi, India. The conference included the 8th Conference of the Parties (COP8) to the United Nations Framework Convention on Climate Change (UNFCCC).

The conference adopted the Delhi Ministerial Declaration that, amongst others, called for efforts by developed countries to transfer technology and minimize the impact of climate change on developing countries. It is also approved the New Delhi work programme on Article 6 of the Convention. The COP8 was marked by Russia's hesitation, stating that it needed more time to think it over. The Kyoto Protocol could enter into force once it was ratified by 55 countries, including countries responsible for 55 per cent of the developed world's 1990 carbon dioxide emissions. With the United States (36.1% share of developed-world carbon dioxide) and Australia refusing ratification, Russia's agreement (17% of global emissions in 1990) was required to meet the ratification criteria and therefore Russia could delay the process.
