= 2005 United Nations Climate Change Conference =

Intergovernmental meeting to address global warming

United Nations Climate Change Conference COP11
- Dates: 28 November 2005– 9 December 2005
- Locations: Montreal, Quebec, Canada
- Previous event: ← Buenos Aires 2004
- Next event: Nairobi 2006 →
- Participants: UNFCCC member countries
- Website: Reports of the conference of the parties

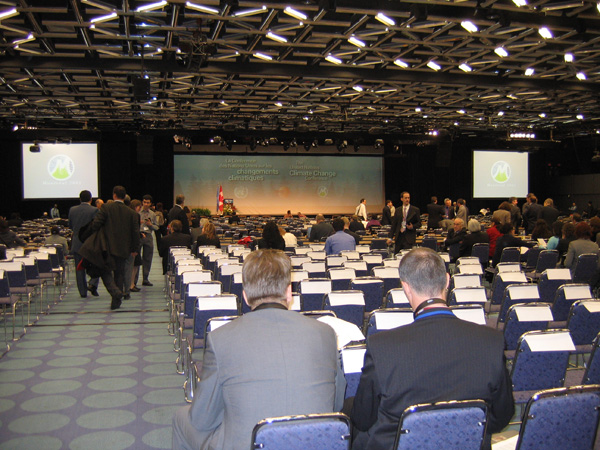
Attendees at the 2005 United Nations Climate Change Conference

The 2005 United Nations Climate Change Conference took place between November 28 and December 9, 2005, in Montreal, Quebec, Canada. The conference included the 11th Conference of the Parties (COP11) to the United Nations Framework Convention on Climate Change (UNFCCC), and was the first Meeting of the Parties (MOP1) to the Kyoto Protocol since their initial meeting in Kyoto in 1997.

The conference was one of the largest intergovernmental conferences on climate change ever. The event marked the entry into force of the Kyoto Protocol on 16 February 2005. Hosting more than 10,000 delegates, it was one of Canada's largest international events ever and the largest gathering in Montreal since Expo 67.

The Montreal Action Plan was an agreement to "extend the life of the Kyoto Protocol beyond its 2012 expiration date and negotiate deeper cuts in greenhouse gas emissions" by starting negotiations, without delay on an extension of the protocol. Canada's environment minister, at the time, Stéphane Dion, said the agreement provides a "map for the future".
