= Joke Waller-Hunter =

Dutch environmentalist (1946–2005)

Joke Waller-Hunter (15 November 1946 - 14 October 2005) was a Dutch United Nations official who worked on several environmental issues including the Kyoto Accord.

== Biography ==
She was born Joke Hendrina Hunter in Haarlem, daughter of Cornelis Hunter and Hendrina van Smalen. She studied French and, as a student in 1969, married Herman Waller, of the old patrician family Waller from Nijkerk, who died at the age of 48 in 1991. She started working for the province of North Holland, and after that for many years at the Ministry of Housing, Spatial Planning and the Environment. Her efforts at the Earth Summit in Rio de Janeiro in 1992 drew much attention, and even earned her the moniker Dutch Maffia amongst opponents of a treaty.

She was the first UN Director for the United Nations Commission on Sustainable Development, a position which she served from 1994 to 1998. From 1998 to 2002 she was director of the OECD Environment Directorate. She then joined the UN Framework Convention on Climate Change as Executive Secretary.

She was awarded an honorary doctorate from the Vrije Universiteit in September 2005 citing her contribution to society through her outstanding work in the field of sustainable development and protection of the global climate. After her death as the result of breast cancer at the age of 58 in a hospital in Lohmar, the UN organized a memorial ceremony in Bonn and a memorial concert in Montréal. Childless, she left her estate to the Dutch environmental organization Both ENDS.

== Sources ==
- Joke Waller-Hunter at UNFCCC site.
- "Mother of Kyoto" at www.bothends.org (Dutch)
