= Subsidiary Body for Implementation =

The Subsidiary Body for Implementation (SBI) is a subsidiary body of the United Nations Framework Convention on Climate Change (UNFCCC) Conference of the Parties (COP). It meets at least twice a year to assist the COP in the assessment and review of the effective implementation of the Convention. It is designed to be open to participation by all parties and to be multidisciplinary.

== Mandate ==
It is mandated by the UNFCCC in Article 10 of the Convention. Paragraph two, the role is described:

(a) "Consider the information communicated in accordance with Article 12, paragraph 1, to assess the overall aggregated effect of the steps taken by the Parties in the light of the latest scientific assessments concerning climate change;

(b) "Consider the information communicated in accordance with Article 12, paragraph 2, in order to assist the COP in carrying out the reviews required by Article 4, paragraph 2 (d); and

(c) "Assist the COP, as appropriate, in the preparation and implementation of its decisions."

== See also ==
- Subsidiary Body of Scientific and Technological Advice
