= United Nations Framework Convention on Climate Change =

International environmental treaty

UNFCCC
United Nations Framework Convention on Climate Change
- Type: Multilateral environmental agreement
- Context: Environmentalism
- Drafted: 9 May 1992
- Signed: 4–14 June 1992; 20 June 1992 – 19 June 1993
- Location: Rio de Janeiro, Brazil; New York, United States
- Effective: 21 March 1994
- Condition: Ratification by 50 states
- Signatories: 165
- Parties: 198
- Depositary: Secretary-General of the United Nations
- Languages: Arabic; Chinese; English; French; Russian; Spanish

Full text
- United Nations Framework Convention on Climate Change at Wikisource

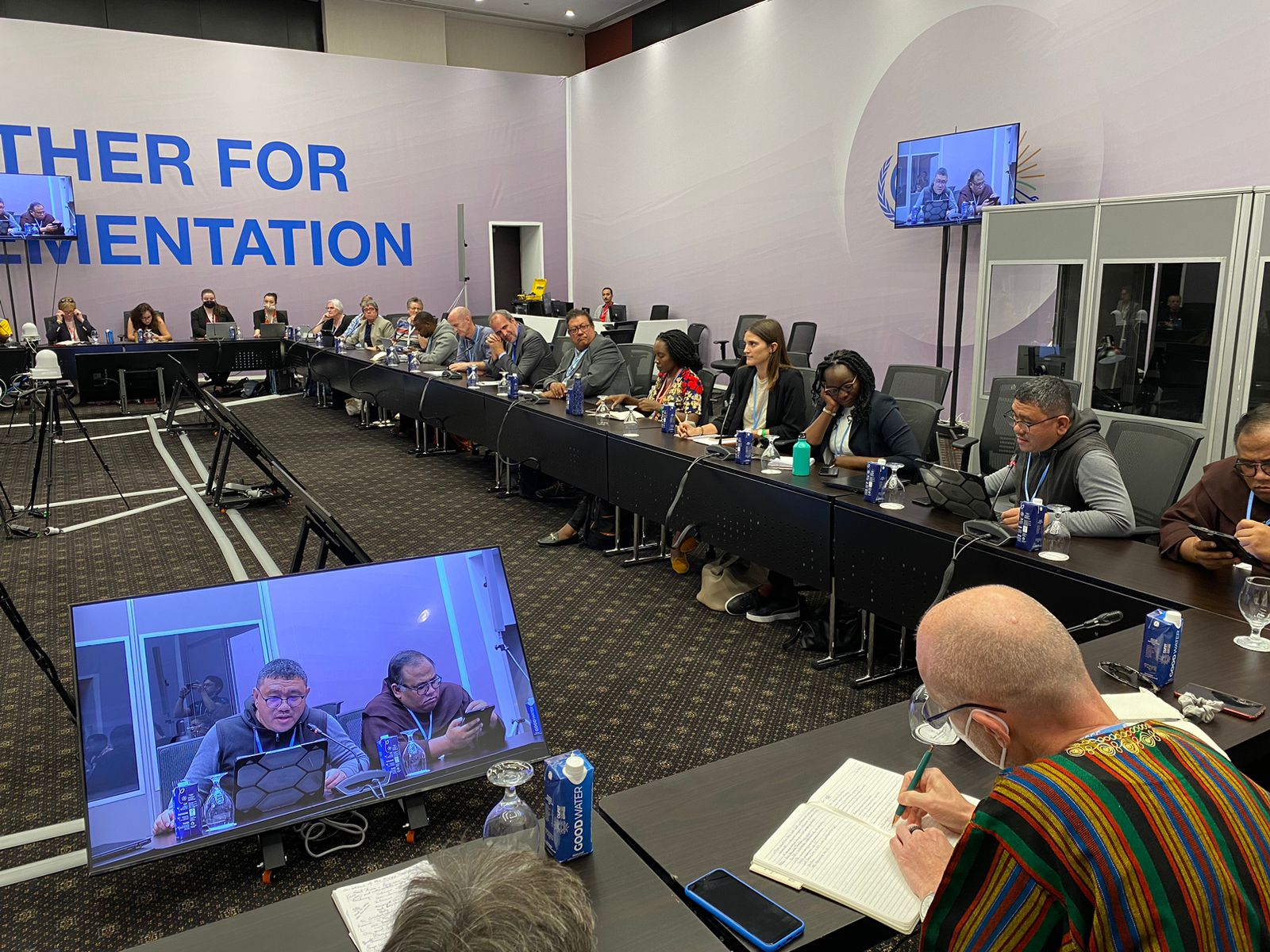
Living Laudato Si' Philippines intervention at COP 27 Catholic Actors meeting with the Holy See delegation

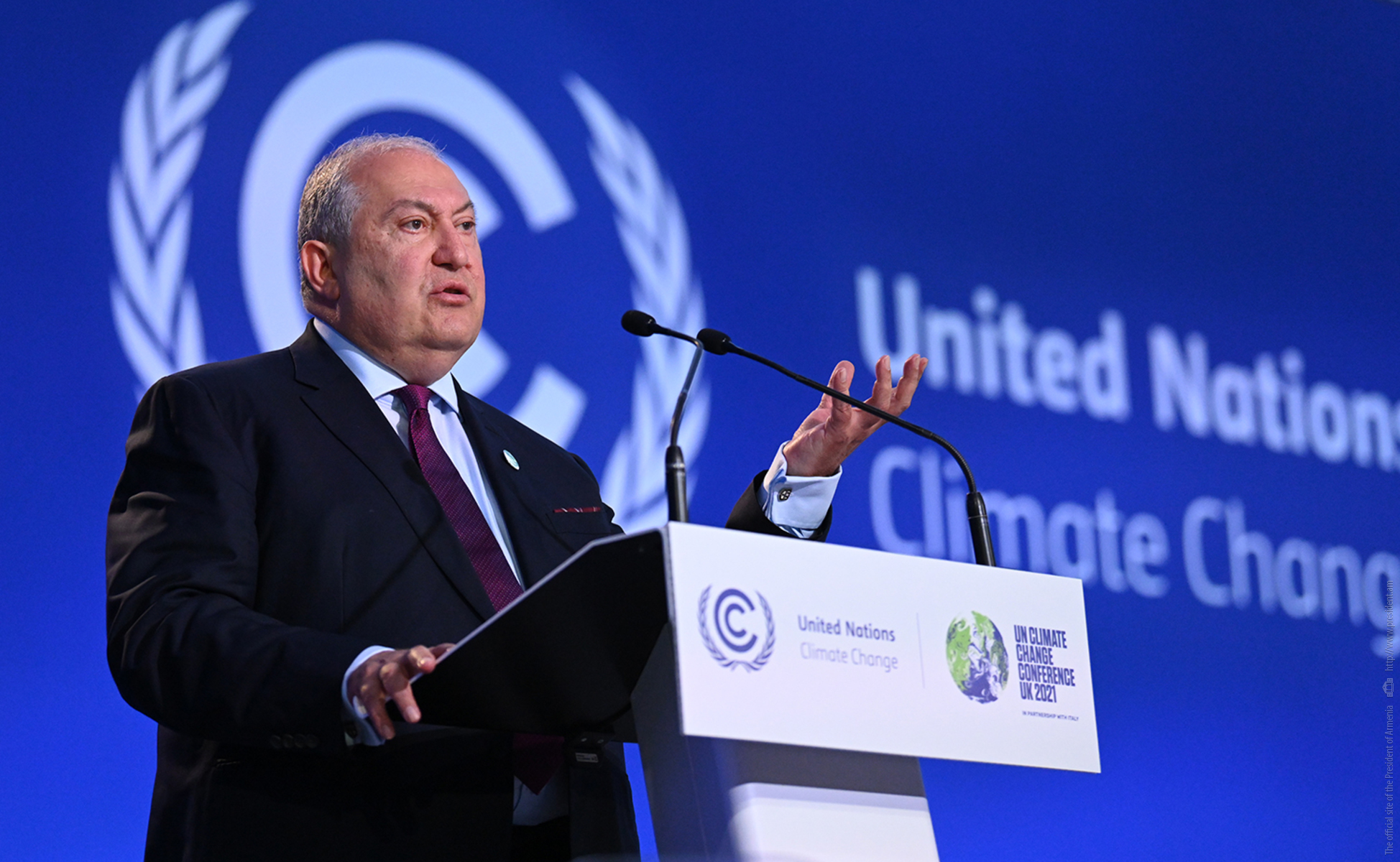
Armen Sarkissian, the 4th president of Armenia from 2018 to 2022, attends the COP 26

The United Nations Framework Convention on Climate Change (UNFCCC) is the UN process for negotiating an agreement to limit dangerous climate change. It is an international treaty among countries to combat "dangerous human interference with the climate system". The main way to do this is limiting the increase in greenhouse gases in the atmosphere. The Convention established the principle of "common but differentiated responsibilities," which asserts that all countries share responsibility for addressing climate change. However, developed countries are expected to assume a leading role because of their greater historical emissions. It was signed in 1992 by 154 states at the UN Conference on Environment and Development (UNCED), known as the Earth Summit. The treaty entered into force in 1994. "UNFCCC" is also the name of the Secretariat charged with supporting the operation of the convention, with offices on the UN Campus in Bonn, Germany.

The treaty calls for continuing scientific research into the climate. This research supports meetings and negotiations to lead to agreements. The aim is to allow ecosystems to adapt to climate change. At the same time it aims to ensure there are no threats to food production from climate change or measures to address it. And it aims to enable economic development to proceed in a sustainable manner. The UNFCCC's work currently focuses on implementing the Paris Agreement, which entered into force in 2016. It aims to limit the rise in global temperature to well below 2 °C (3.6 °F) above levels before the Industrial Revolution, and even aiming to hold it at 1.5 °C (2.7 °F). The treaty sets out responsibilities for three categories of states: developed countries, developed countries with special financial responsibilities, and developing countries. The developed countries are called Annex I countries, and should adopt national policies and take corresponding measures to limit their emissions of greenhouse gases. They should report on steps for returning individually or jointly to their 1990 greenhouse gas emission levels.

By 2022, the UNFCCC had 198 parties. Its supreme decision-making body, the Conference of the Parties (COP), meets annually. Other meetings at the regional and technical level take place throughout the year. The Paris Agreement mandates a review or "global stocktake" of progress towards meeting its goals every five years. The first of these took place at COP28 in the United Arab Emirates (UAE) in 2023.

It is problematic that key signatory states are not adhering to their commitments. For this reason, the UNFCCC has been criticized as being unsuccessful in reducing greenhouse gas emission. Parties to the convention have not agreed on a process allowing for majority voting. All decisions are taken by consensus, giving individual parties or countries a veto. The effectiveness of the Paris Agreement to reach its climate goals is under debate, especially with regards to its more ambitious goal of keeping global temperature rise to under 1.5 °C. A hybrid meeting cycle alternating in-person summits with virtual sessions is proposed as a means of enhancing equity and effectiveness in climate governance under the UNFCCC.

== Development ==
The IPCC's First Assessment Report appeared in 1990. The report gave a broad overview of climate change science and the scientific consensus to date. It discussed uncertainties and provided evidence of warming. The authors said they are certain that greenhouse gases are increasing in the atmosphere because of human activity. This is resulting in more warming of the Earth's surface. The report led to the establishment of the United Nations Framework Convention on Climate Change (UNFCCC).

=== Convention Agreement in 1992 ===
The text of the convention was produced during the meeting of an Intergovernmental Negotiating Committee in New York from 30 April to 9 May 1992. The convention was adopted on 9 May 1992 and opened for signature on 4 June 1992 at the United Nations Conference on Environment and Development (UNCED) in Rio de Janeiro (known by its popular title, the Earth Summit). On 12 June 1992, 154 nations signed the UNFCCC, which upon ratification committed signatories' governments to reduce atmospheric concentrations of greenhouse gases with the goal of "preventing dangerous anthropogenic interference with Earth's climate system". This commitment would require substantial reductions in greenhouse gas emissions (see the later section, "Stabilization of greenhouse gas concentrations"). Parties to the Convention have met annually from 1995 in Conferences of the Parties (COPs) to assess progress in dealing with climate change.

Article 3(1) of the Convention states that Parties should act to protect the climate system on the basis of "common but differentiated responsibilities and respective capabilities", and that developed country Parties should "take the lead" in addressing climate change. Under Article 4, all Parties make general commitments to address climate change through, for example, climate change mitigation and adapting to the eventual impacts of climate change. Article 4(7) states:

The extent to which developing country Parties will effectively implement their commitments under the Convention will depend on the effective implementation by developed country Parties of their commitments under the Convention related to financial resources and transfer of technology and will take fully into account that economic and social development and poverty eradication are the first and overriding priorities of the developing country Parties.

The Convention specifies the aim of Annex I Parties was stabilizing their greenhouse gas emissions (carbon dioxide and other anthropogenic greenhouse gases not regulated under the Montreal Protocol) at 1990 levels, by 2000.

=== Overarching objective ===
The ultimate objective of the Framework Convention is specified in Article 2: "stabilization of greenhouse gas concentrations in the atmosphere at a level that would prevent dangerous anthropogenic [i.e., human-caused] interference with the climate system". Article 2 of the convention says this "should be achieved within a time-frame sufficient to allow ecosystems to adapt naturally to climate change, to ensure that food production is not threatened and to enable economic development to proceed in a sustainable manner".

=== Six priority areas (Action for Climate Empowerment) ===
Action for Climate Empowerment (ACE) is a term adopted by the UNFCCC in 2015 to have a better name for this topic than "Article 6". It refers to Article 6 of the convention's original text (1992), focusing on six priority areas: education, training, public awareness, public participation, public access to information, and international cooperation on these issues. The implementation of all six areas has been identified as the pivotal factor for everyone to understand and participate in solving the challenges presented by climate change. ACE calls on governments to develop and implement educational and public awareness programmes, train scientific, technical and managerial personnel, foster access to information, and promote public participation in addressing climate change and its effects. It also urges countries to cooperate in this process, by exchanging good practices and lessons learned, and strengthening national institutions. This wide scope of activities is guided by specific objectives that, together, are seen as crucial for effectively implementing climate adaptation and mitigation actions, and for achieving the ultimate objective of the UNFCCC.

== Key agreements and protocols ==
=== Kyoto Protocol ===
Map of parties to the Kyoto Protocol Annex B parties with binding targets in 1st and 2nd period Annex B parties with binding targets in 1st period but not 2nd Non-Annex B parties without binding targets Annex B parties with binding targets in 1st period but which withdrew from the Protocol Signatories to the Protocol that have not ratified Other UN member states and observers that are not party to the Protocol

The Kyoto Protocol (Japanese: 京都議定書, Hepburn: Kyōto Giteisho) was an international treaty which extended the 1992 United Nations Framework Convention on Climate Change (UNFCCC) that commits state parties to reduce greenhouse gas emissions, based on the scientific consensus that global warming is occurring and that human-made CO_{2} emissions are driving it. The Kyoto Protocol was adopted in Kyoto, Japan, on 11 December 1997 and entered into force on 16 February 2005. There were 192 parties (Canada withdrew from the protocol, effective December 2012) to the Protocol in 2020.

The Kyoto Protocol implemented the objective of the UNFCCC to reduce the onset of global warming by reducing greenhouse gas concentrations in the atmosphere to "a level that would prevent dangerous anthropogenic interference with the climate system" (Article 2). The Kyoto Protocol applied to the seven greenhouse gases listed in Annex A: carbon dioxide (CO_{2}), methane (CH_{4}), nitrous oxide (N_{2}O), hydrofluorocarbons (HFCs), perfluorocarbons (PFCs), sulfur hexafluoride (SF_{6}), nitrogen trifluoride (NF_{3}). Nitrogen trifluoride was added for the second compliance period during the Doha Round.

The Protocol was based on the principle of common but differentiated responsibilities: it acknowledged that individual countries have different capabilities in combating climate change, owing to economic development, and therefore placed the obligation to reduce current emissions on developed countries on the basis that they are historically responsible for the current levels of greenhouse gases in the atmosphere.

The Protocol's first commitment period started in 2008 and ended in 2012. All 36 countries that fully participated in the first commitment period complied with the Protocol. However, nine countries had to resort to the flexibility mechanisms by funding emission reductions in other countries because their national emissions were slightly greater than their targets. The 2008 financial crisis reduced emissions. The greatest emission reductions were seen in the former Eastern Bloc countries because the dissolution of the Soviet Union reduced their emissions in the early 1990s. Even though the 36 developed countries reduced their emissions, the global emissions increased by 32% from 1990 to 2010.

=== Paris Agreement ===
Map of signatories and parties to the Paris Agreement State parties Signatories that have not ratified Parties that withdrew Parties also covered by EU ratification Agreement does not apply

The Paris Agreement (also called the Paris Accords or Paris Climate Accords) is an international treaty on climate change that was signed in 2016. The treaty covers climate change mitigation, adaptation, and finance. The Paris Agreement was negotiated by 196 parties at the 2015 United Nations Climate Change Conference near Paris, France. As of January 2026, 194 members of the United Nations Framework Convention on Climate Change (UNFCCC) are parties to the agreement. Of the three UNFCCC member states which have not ratified the agreement, the only major emitter is Iran. The United States, the second largest emitter, withdrew from the agreement in 2020, rejoined in 2021, and withdrew again in 2026.

The Paris Agreement has a long-term temperature goal which is to keep the rise in global surface temperature to well below 2 °C (3.6 °F) above pre-industrial levels. The treaty also states that preferably the limit of the increase should only be 1.5 °C (2.7 °F). These limits are defined as averages of the global temperature measured over twenty years.

=== Further commitments ===
In addition to the Kyoto Protocol (and its amendment) and the Paris Agreement, parties to the Convention have agreed to further commitments during UNFCCC Conferences of the Parties. These include the Bali Action Plan (2007), the Copenhagen Accord (2009), the Cancún agreements (2010), and the Durban Platform for Enhanced Action (2012).

Bali Action Plan

As part of the Bali Action Plan, adopted in 2007, all developed country Parties have agreed to "quantified emission limitation and reduction objectives, while ensuring the comparability of efforts among them, taking into account differences in their national circumstances". Developing country Parties agreed to "[nationally] appropriate mitigation actions context of sustainable development, supported and enabled by technology, financing and capacity-building, in a measurable, reportable and verifiable manner." 42 developed countries have submitted mitigation targets to the UNFCCC secretariat, as have 57 developing countries and the African Group (a group of countries within the UN).

Copenhagen Accord and Cancún agreements

As part of the 2009 Copenhagen negotiations, a number of countries produced the Copenhagen Accord. The Accord states that global warming should be limited to below 2.0 °C (3.6 °F). The Accord does not specify what the baseline is for these temperature targets (e.g., relative to pre-industrial or 1990 temperatures). According to the UNFCCC, these targets are relative to pre-industrial temperatures.

114 countries agreed to the Accord. The UNFCCC secretariat notes that "Some Parties ... stated in their communications to the secretariat specific understandings on the nature of the Accord and related matters, based on which they have agreed to [the Accord]." The Accord was not formally adopted by the Conference of the Parties. Instead, the COP "took note of the Copenhagen Accord."

As part of the Accord, 17 developed country Parties and the EU-27 submitted mitigation targets, as did 45 developing country Parties. Some developing country Parties noted the need for international support in their plans.

As part of the Cancún agreements, developed and developing countries submitted mitigation plans to the UNFCCC. These plans were compiled with those made as part of the Bali Action Plan.

UN Race-to-Zero Emissions Breakthroughs

At the 2021 annual meeting UNFCCC launched the 'UN Race-to-Zero Emissions Breakthroughs'. The aim of the campaign is to transform 20 sectors of the economy in order to achieve zero greenhouse gas emissions. At least 20% of each sector should take specific measures, and 10 sectors should be transformed before COP 26 in Glasgow. According to the organizers, 20% is a tipping point, after which the whole sector begins to irreversibly change.

Developing countries

At Berlin, Cancún, and Durban, the development needs of developing country parties were reiterated. For example, the Durban Platform reaffirms that:

[...] social and economic development and poverty eradication are the first and overriding priorities of developing country Parties, and that a low-emission development strategy is central to sustainable development, and that the share of global emissions originating in developing countries will grow to meet their social and development needs.

==== Green Climate Fund ====
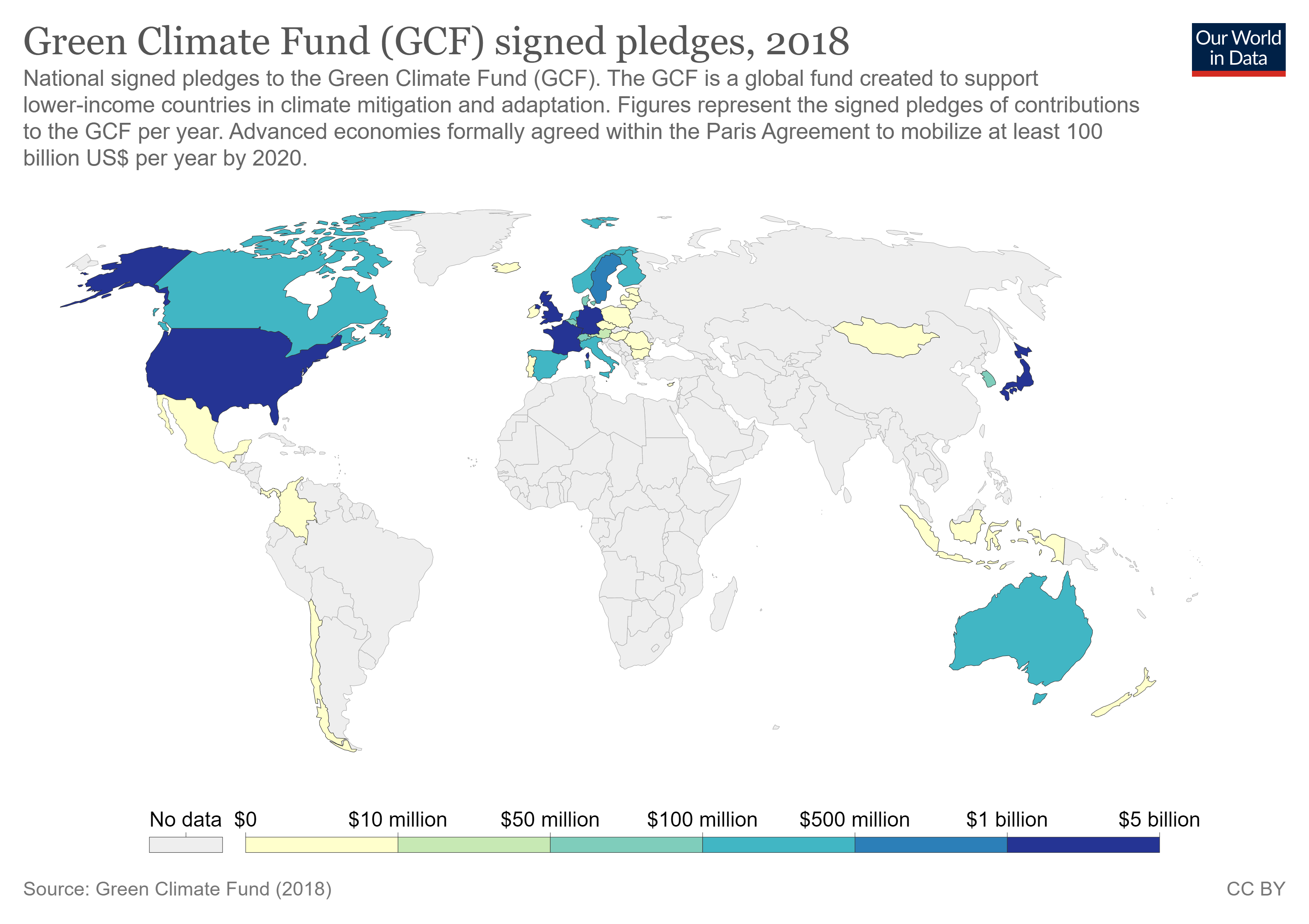
World map for Sustainable Development Goal 13 Indicator 13.A.1: Green Climate Fund mobilization of $100 billion, 2018

The UN Sustainable Development Goal 13 (SDG 13) includes a target about the UNFCCC and explains how the Green Climate Fund is meant to be used: One of the five targets under SDG 13, meant to be achieved by 2030, states: "Implement the commitment undertaken by developed-country parties to the United Nations Framework Convention on Climate Change to a goal of mobilizing jointly $100 billion annually by 2020 from all sources to address the needs of developing countries in the context of meaningful mitigation actions and transparency on implementation and fully operationalize the Green Climate Fund through its capitalization as soon as possible." This target only has one indicator: Indicator 13.a is the "Amounts provided and mobilized in United States dollars per year in relation to the continued existing collective mobilization goal of the $100 billion commitment through to 2025".

The Green Climate Fund (GCF) is a fund for climate finance that was established within the framework of the United Nations Framework Convention on Climate Change (UNFCCC). Considered the world's largest fund of its kind, GCF's objective is to assist developing countries with climate change adaptation and mitigation activities. The GCF is an operating entity of the financial mechanism of the UNFCCC. It is based in Songdo, Incheon, South Korea and governed by a board of 24 members and supported by a Secretariat.

Mafalda Duarte, a Portuguese development economist, is the fund's executive director.

The GCF supports projects and other activities in developing countries using thematic funding windows. There are four other, smaller multilateral climate funds for paying out money in climate finance which are coordinated by the UNFCCC. These include the Adaptation Fund (AF), the Least Developed Countries Fund (LDCF), the Special Climate Change Fund (SCCF) and the Global Environment Facility (GEF). The GCF is the largest of these five funds.

As of November 2026, the GCF had a portfolio of over $22.3 billion USD (over $87.1 billion USD including co-financing).

The process of designing the GCF has raised several issues. These include ongoing questions on how funds will be raised, the role of the private sector, the level of "country ownership" of resources, and the transparency of the Board itself. Also, this additional international climate institution might further fragment taxpayer's money that is put towards climate action.

The GCF's former director Héla Cheikhrouhou complained in 2016 that the fund was backing too many "business-as-usual types of investment proposals".

In 2023, the executive director announced a series of reforms aimed at making the fund more efficient and positioned to deliver greater impact.

== Secretariat and offices ==
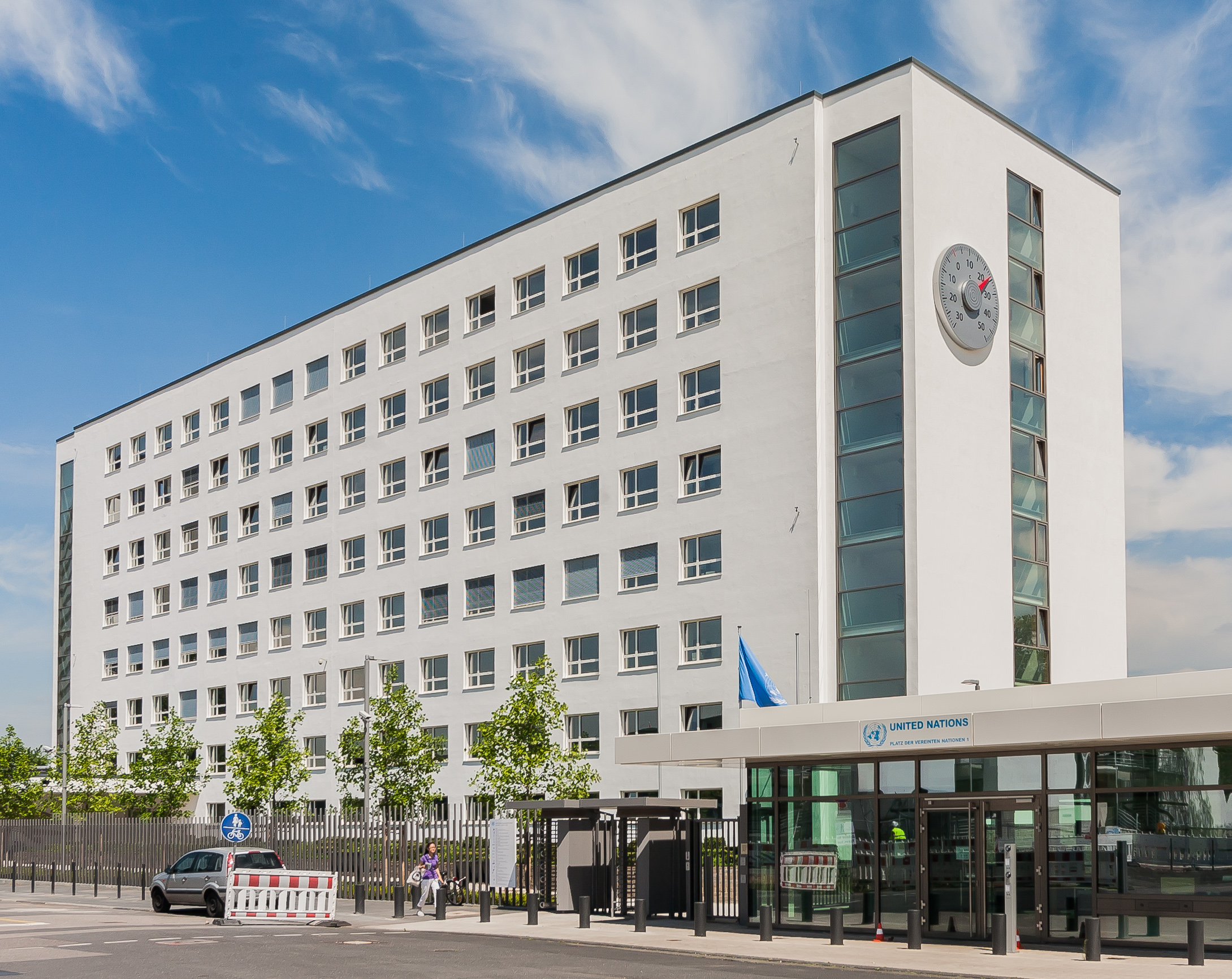
UN Campus, Bonn, seat of the secretariat

"UNFCCC" is also the name of the Secretariat charged with supporting the operation of the convention, with offices on the UN Campus in Bonn, Germany. Offices were formerly located in Haus Carstanjen and in a building on the UN Campus known as Langer Eugen.

The secretariat is established under Article 8 of the convention and headed by the Executive Secretary. The secretariat, augmented through the parallel efforts of the Intergovernmental Panel on Climate Change (IPCC), aims to gain consensus through meetings and the discussion of various strategies. Since the signing of the UNFCCC treaty, Conferences of the Parties (COPs) have discussed how to achieve the treaty's aims.

From 2010 to 2016 the head of the secretariat was Christiana Figueres, following by Patricia Espinosa who was appointed Executive Secretary on 18 May 2016 by United Nations Secretary-General Ban Ki-moon and took office on 18 July 2016. Espinosa retired on 16 July 2022. UN Under Secretary General Ibrahim Thiaw served as the acting Executive Secretary in the interim. On 15 August 2022, Secretary-General António Guterres appointed former Grenadian climate minister Simon Stiell as Executive Secretary, replacing Espinosa.

Current and former executive secretaries are:

List of Executive Secretaries of the UNFCCC Sources:
Sr	Executive Secretary	Country	Tenure		Other offices held
Sr	Executive Secretary	Country	From	To	Other offices held
1	Michael Zammit Cutajar	Malta	1995	2002	
2	Joke Waller-Hunter	Netherlands	1 May 2002	14 October 2005	(United Nations) Director for Sustainable Development (1994–98)
Acting	Richard Kinley	Canada	15 October 2005	9 August 2006	Deputy Executive Secretary, UNFCCC 2006 - 2016; Chairman, FOGGS (2016–)
3	Yvo de Boer	Netherlands	10 August 2006	1 July 2010	
4	Christiana Figueres	Costa Rica	1 July 2010	18 July 2016	
5	Patricia Espinosa	Mexico	18 July 2016	16 July 2022	(Mexico) Secretary of Foreign Affairs (2006–12) (Mexico) Ambassador to Germany (2013–16)
Acting	Ibrahim Thiaw	Mauritania	17 July 2022	14 August 2022	Under Secretary General of the United Nations and UNCCD Executive Secretary (2019-2025)
6	Simon Stiell	Grenada	15 August 2022	current	(Grenada) Environment minister (2017–22)

== Processes ==
=== Relationship with IPCC reports ===
The reports published by IPCC play a key role in the annual climate negotiations held by the UNFCCC. For example, the UNFCCC invited the IPCC to prepare a report on global warming of 1.5 °C. The IPCC subsequently released the Special Report on Global Warming of 1.5 °C (SR15) in 2018. The report showed that it was possible to keep warming below 1.5 °C during the 21st century. But this would mean deep cuts in emissions. It would also mean rapid, far-reaching changes in all aspects of society. The report showed warming of 2 °C would have much more severe impacts than 1.5 °C. In other words: every bit of warming matters. SR15 had an unprecedented impact for an IPCC report in the media and with the public. It put the 1.5 °C target at the center of climate activism.

=== Conferences of the Parties (CoP) ===
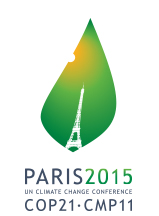
Logo of United Nations Framework Convention on Climate Change, 21st Conference of the Parties (COP 21) and 11th Meeting of the Parties to the 1997 Kyoto Protocol (CMP 11) from November, 30th till December 2015, 12th

The United Nations Climate Change Conference are yearly conferences held in the framework of the UNFCCC. They serve as the formal meeting of the UNFCCC Parties (Conferences of the Parties) (COP) to assess progress in dealing with climate change, and beginning in the mid-1990s, to negotiate the Kyoto Protocol to establish legally binding obligations for developed countries to reduce their greenhouse gas emissions. Since 2005 the Conferences also served as the Meetings of Parties of the Kyoto Protocol (CMP) and since 2016 the Conferences also serve as Meeting of the Parties to the Paris Agreement (CMA).

The first conference (COP1) was held in 1995 in Berlin. The 3rd conference (COP3) was held in Kyoto and resulted in the Kyoto protocol, which was amended during the 2012 Doha Conference (COP18, CMP 8). The COP21 (CMP11) conference was held in Paris in 2015 and resulted in adoption of the Paris Agreement. COP28 took place in the United Arab Emirates in 2023 and included the first global stocktake under the Paris Agreement. The UAE nominated Sultan al-Jaber, who is also head of Abu Dhabi's national oil company ADNOC, to preside over COP28. Azerbaijan hosted COP29 in 2024. COP30 was hosted in Brazil.

==== Subsidiary bodies ====
A subsidiary body is a committee that assists the Conference of the Parties. Subsidiary bodies include:

- Permanents:
  - The Subsidiary Body of Scientific and Technological Advice (SBSTA) is established by Article 9 of the convention to provide the Conference of the Parties and, as appropriate, its other subsidiary bodies with timely information and advice on scientific and technological matters relating to the convention. It serves as a link between information and assessments provided by expert sources (such as the IPCC) and the COP, which focuses on setting policy.
  - The Subsidiary Body of Implementation (SBI) is established by Article 10 of the convention to assist the Conference of the Parties in the assessment and review of the effective implementation of the convention. It makes recommendations on policy and implementation issues to the COP and, if requested, to other bodies.
- Temporary:
  - Ad hoc Group on Article 13 (AG13), active from 1995 to 1998;
  - Ad hoc Group on the Berlin Mandate (AGBM), active from 1995 to 1997;
  - Ad Hoc Working Group on Further Commitments for Annex I Parties under the Kyoto Protocol (AWG-KP), established in 2005 by the Parties to the Kyoto Protocol to consider further commitments of industrialized countries under the Kyoto Protocol for the period beyond 2012; it concluded its work in 2012 when the CMP adopted the Doha Amendment;
  - Ad Hoc Working Group on Long-term Cooperative Action (AWG-LCA), established in Bali in 2007 to conduct negotiations on a strengthened international deal on climate change;
  - Ad Hoc Working Group on the Durban Platform for Enhanced Action (ADP), established at COP 17 in Durban in 2011 "to develop a protocol, another legal instrument or an agreed outcome with legal force under the Convention applicable to all Parties." The ADP concluded its work in Paris on 5 December 2015.

=== National communication ===
A "National Communication" is a type of report submitted by the countries that have ratified the United Nations Framework Convention on Climate Change (UNFCCC). Developed countries are required to submit National Communications every four years and developing countries should do so. Some Least Developed Countries have not submitted National Communications in the past 5–15 years, largely due to capacity constraints.

National Communication reports are often several hundred pages long and cover a country's measures to mitigate greenhouse gas emissions as well as a description of its vulnerabilities and impacts from climate change. National Communications are prepared according to guidelines that have been agreed by the Conference of the Parties to the UNFCCC. The (Intended) Nationally Determined Contributions (NDCs) that form the basis of the Paris Agreement are shorter and less detailed but also follow a standardized structure and are subject to technical review by experts.

=== Nationally Determined Contributions ===
At the 19th session of the Conference of the Parties in Warsaw in 2013, the UNFCCC created a mechanism for Intended Nationally Determined Contributions (INDCs) to be submitted in the run up to the 21st session of the Conference of the Parties in Paris (COP21) in 2015. Countries were given freedom and flexibility to ensure that these climate change mitigation and adaptation plans were nationally appropriate. This flexibility, especially regarding the types of actions to be undertaken, allowed for developing countries to tailor their plans to their specific adaptation and mitigation needs, as well as towards other needs.

In the aftermath of COP21, these INDCs became Nationally Determined Contributions (NDCs) as each country ratified the Paris Agreement, unless a new NDC was submitted to the UNFCCC at the same time. The 22nd session of the Conference of the Parties (COP22) in Marrakesh focused on these Nationally Determined Contributions and their implementation, after the Paris Agreement entered into force on 4 November 2016.

In 2021, Climate Policy Radar, a non-profit, was launched to make the climate legislation of countries discoverable in one place. Climate Policy Radar has subsequently developed into an open access, ethical AI-supported searchable online platform that aggregates a wide range of documents and legislation from United Nations bodies and countries.

== Membership and participation ==
Parties to the UNFCCC Annex I and II parties Annex I parties Non-annex parties

As of 2022, the UNFCCC has 198 parties including all United Nations member states, United Nations General Assembly observers the State of Palestine and the Holy See, UN non-member states Niue and the Cook Islands, and the supranational union European Union.

The United States announced its intention to withdraw from the treaty in January 2026, the only country to do so.

=== Classification of Parties and their commitments ===
Parties to the UNFCCC are classified as:

- Annex I: There are 43 Parties to the UNFCCC listed in Annex I of the convention, including the European Union. These Parties are classified as industrialized (developed) countries and "economies in transition" (EITs). The 14 EITs are the former centrally-planned (Soviet) economies of Russia and Eastern Europe.
- Annex II: Of the Parties listed in Annex I of the convention, 24 are also listed in Annex II of the convention, including the European Union. These Parties are made up of members of the Organisation for Economic Co-operation and Development (OECD): these Parties consist of the members of the OECD in 1992, minus Turkey, plus the EU. Annex II Parties are required to provide financial and technical support to the EITs and developing countries to assist them in reducing their greenhouse gas emissions (climate change mitigation) and manage the impacts of climate change (climate change adaptation).
- Least-developed countries (LDCs): 49 Parties are LDCs, and are given special status under the treaty in view of their limited capacity to adapt to the effects of climate change.
- Non-Annex I: Parties to the UNFCCC not listed in Annex I of the convention are mostly low-income developing countries. Developing countries may volunteer to become Annex I countries when they are sufficiently developed.

Parties: Annexes, EU, OECD, EITs

=== Annex I countries ===
There are 43 Annex I Parties including the European Union. These countries are classified as industrialized countries and economies in transition. Of these, 24 are also Annex II Parties, including the European Union, and 14 are Economies in Transition.

Annex I countries (24 of these are also Annex II Parties):

1. Australia (Note: Annex II Party)
2. Austria
3. Belgium
4. Canada
5. Cyprus
6. Denmark
7. (European Union) EU
8. Finland
9. France
10. Germany
11. Greece
12. Iceland
13. (Republic of Ireland) Ireland
14. Italy
15. Japan
16. Liechtenstein
17. Luxembourg
18. Malta
19. Monaco
20. Netherlands
21. New Zealand
22. Norway
23. Portugal
24. Spain
25. Sweden
26. Switzerland
27. Turkey
28. United Kingdom
29. United States of America

Annex I countries that are Economies in Transition:

1. Belarus
2. Bulgaria
3. Croatia
4. Czech Republic
5. Estonia
6. Hungary
7. Latvia
8. Lithuania
9. Poland
10. Romania
11. (Russia) Russian Federation
12. Slovakia
13. Slovenia
14. Ukraine

=== Engagement of civil society ===
In 2014, The UN with Peru and France created the Global Climate Action Portal NAZCA for writing and checking all the climate commitments.

Thousands of observers from civil society, business and academia attend the COPs. They organize a huge programme of activities including officially coordinated "side events". These complement and inform the official negotiations.

Civil Society Observers under the UNFCCC have organized themselves in loose groups, covering about 90% of all admitted organisations. Some groups remain outside these broad groupings, such as faith groups or national parliamentarians. The UNFCCC secretariat also recognizes the following groups as informal NGO groups (2016): Faith-based organizations, Education and Capacity Building and Outreach NGOs, parliamentarians.

An overview is given in the table below:

Name	Abbreviation	Admitted since
Business and industry NGOs	BINGO	1992
Environmental NGOs	ENGO	1992
Local government and municipal authorities	LGMA	COP1 (1995)
Indigenous peoples organizations	IPO	COP7 (2001)
Research and independent NGOs	RINGO	COP9 (2003)
Trade union NGOs	TUNGO	Before COP 14 (2008)
Women and gender	WGC	Shortly before COP17 (2011)
Youth NGOs	YOUNGO	Shortly before COP17 (2011)
Farmers	Farmers	(2014)

== Analysis ==
=== Interpreting ultimate objective in Article 2 ===
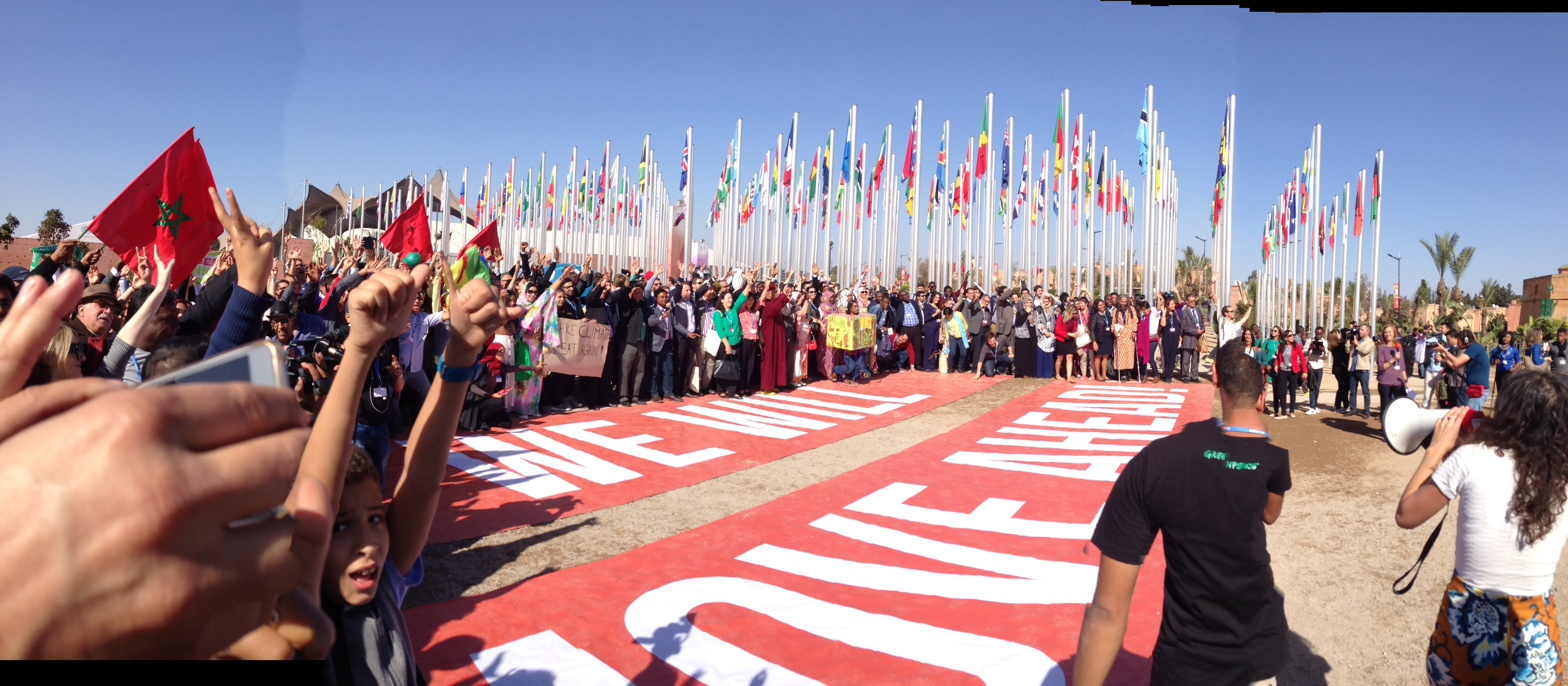
A "family photo" in 2016, organized by Greenpeace, at the entrance to the United Nations, with a banner reading "We Will Move Ahead". It highlighted the resolve, despite all the differences, that we will continue to pursue strong climate action, moving towards 100 per cent renewals and aiming for 1.5C target.

The ultimate objective of the Framework Convention contains some key words that are discussed further below and shown here in italics: "stabilization of greenhouse gas concentrations in the atmosphere at a level that would prevent dangerous anthropogenic [i.e., human-caused] interference with the climate system".

To stabilize atmospheric GHG concentrations, global anthropogenic GHG emissions would need to peak then decline (see climate change mitigation). Lower stabilization levels would require emissions to peak and decline earlier compared to higher stabilization levels. These lower stabilization levels are associated with lower magnitudes of global warming compared to higher stabilization levels.

There are a range of views over what level of climate change is dangerous. Scientific analysis can provide information on the risks of climate change, but deciding which risks are dangerous requires value judgements.

The global warming that has already occurred poses a risk to some human and natural systems. Higher magnitudes of global warming will generally increase the risk of negative impacts. Climate change risks are "considerable" with 1 to 2 °C of global warming, relative to pre-industrial levels. 4 °C warming would lead to significantly increased risks, with potential impacts including widespread loss of biodiversity and reduced global and regional food security.

Climate change policies may lead to costs that are relevant to the article 2. For example, more stringent policies to control GHG emissions may reduce the risk of more severe climate change, but may also be more expensive to implement.

In decision making, the precautionary principle is considered when possibly dangerous, irreversible, or catastrophic events are identified, but scientific evaluation of the potential damage is not sufficiently certain. The precautionary principle implies an emphasis on the need to prevent such adverse effects. Following the precautionary principle, uncertainty (about the exact effects of climate change) is not a reason for inaction, and this is acknowledged in Article 3.3 of the UNFCCC.

=== International trade ===
Academics and environmentalists criticize article 3(5) of the convention, which states that any climate measures that would restrict international trade should be avoided.

== Reception ==
=== Criticism of processes ===
The overall umbrella and processes of the UNFCCC and the adopted Kyoto Protocol have been criticized by some as not having achieved their stated goals of reducing the emission of greenhouse gases. The UNFCCC is a multilateral body concerned with climate change and can be an inefficient system for enacting international policy: Because the framework system includes over 190 countries and because negotiations are governed by consensus, small groups of countries can often block progress.

There has been a failure to achieve effective greenhouse gas emission reduction policy treaties since 1992. This has driven some countries like the United States to hold back from ratifying the UNFCCC's most important agreement—the Kyoto Protocol—in large part because the treaty did not cover developing countries which now include the largest CO_{2} emitters. However, this failed to take into account both the historical responsibility for climate change since industrialization, which is a contentious issue in the talks, and also responsibility for emissions from consumption and importation of goods (see carbon footprint). It has also led Canada to withdraw from the Kyoto Protocol in 2011 out of a wish not to make its citizens pay penalties that would result in wealth transfers out of Canada. Both the US and Canada are looking at internal Voluntary Emissions Reduction schemes to curb carbon dioxide emissions outside the Kyoto Protocol.

The perceived lack of progress has also led some countries to seek and focus on alternative high-value activities like the creation of the Climate and Clean Air Coalition to Reduce Short-Lived Climate Pollutants which seeks to regulate short-lived pollutants such as methane, black carbon and hydrofluorocarbons (HFCs), which together are believed to account for up to one third of current global warming but whose regulation is not as fraught with wide economic impacts and opposition.

In 2010, Japan stated that it will not sign up to a second Kyoto term, because it would impose restrictions on it not faced by its main economic competitors, China, India and Indonesia. A similar indication was given by the Prime Minister of New Zealand in November 2012. At the 2012 conference, last-minute objections at the conference by Russia, Ukraine, Belarus and Kazakhstan were ignored by the governing officials, and they have indicated that they will likely withdraw or not ratify the treaty. These defections place additional pressures on the UNFCCC process that is seen by some as cumbersome and expensive: in the UK alone, the climate change department has taken over 3,000 flights in two years at a cost of over £1,300,000 (British pounds sterling).

Further, the UNFCCC (mainly during the Kyoto protocol) failed to facilitate the transfer of environmentally sound technologies (SETs) which are mechanisms used to decrease the vulnerability of the human race against the unfavorable effects of climate change. One of the more widely used of these being renewable energy sources. The UNFCCC created the body "technology mechanism" who would distribute these resources to developing countries; however this distribution was too moderate and, coupled with the failings of the first commitment period of the Kyoto protocol, led to low ratification numbers for the second commitment (resulting in it not going ahead). Before the 2015 United Nations Climate Change Conference, National Geographic magazine added to the criticism, writing: "Since 1992, when the world's nations agreed at Rio de Janeiro to avoid 'dangerous anthropogenic interference with the climate system,' they've met 20 times without moving the needle on carbon emissions. In that interval we've added almost as much carbon to the atmosphere as we did in the previous century."

=== Criticism of effectiveness of Paris Agreement ===
Scenarios of global greenhouse gas emissions. If all countries achieve their current Paris Agreement pledges, average warming by 2100 would still exceed the maximum 2°C target set by the agreement.

The effectiveness of the Paris Agreement to reach its climate goals is under debate, with most experts saying it is insufficient for its more ambitious goal of keeping global temperature rise under 1.5 °C. Many of the exact provisions of the Paris Agreement have yet to be straightened out, so that it may be too early to judge effectiveness. According to the 2020 United Nations Environment Programme (UNEP), with the current climate commitments of the Paris Agreement, global mean temperatures will likely rise by more than 3 °C by the end of the 21st century. Newer net zero commitments were not included in the Nationally Determined Contributions, and may bring down temperatures by a further 0.5 °C.

With initial pledges by countries inadequate, faster and more expensive future mitigation would be needed to still reach the targets. Furthermore, there is a gap between pledges by countries in their NDCs and implementation of these pledges; one third of the emission gap between the lowest-costs and actual reductions in emissions would be closed by implementing existing pledges. A pair of studies in Nature found that as of 2017 none of the major industrialized nations were implementing the policies they had pledged, and none met their pledged emission reduction targets, and even if they had, the sum of all member pledges (as of 2016) would not keep global temperature rise "well below 2°C".

In 2021, a study using a probabilistic model concluded that the rates of emissions reductions would have to increase by 80% beyond NDCs to likely meet the 2 °C upper target of the Paris Agreement, that the probabilities of major emitters meeting their NDCs without such an increase is very low. It estimated that with current trends the probability of staying below 2 °C of warming is 5–26% if NDCs were met and continued post-2030 by all signatories.

As of 2020, there is little scientific literature on the topics of the effectiveness of the Paris Agreement on capacity building and adaptation, even though they feature prominently in the Paris Agreement. The literature available is mostly mixed in its conclusions about loss and damage, and adaptation.

According to the stocktake report, the agreement has a significant effect: while in 2010 the expected temperature rise by 2100 was 3.7–4.8 °C, at COP 27 it was 2.4–2.6 °C and if all countries will fulfill their long-term pledges even 1.7–2.1 °C. Despite it, the world is still very far from reaching the aim of the agreement: limiting temperature rise to 1.5 degrees. For doing this, emissions must peak by 2025. Recent work – on the basis of the first single calendar year in 2024 with an average temperature above 1.5 degrees Celsius – indicates that most probably Earth has already entered the 20-year period that will reach an average warming of 1.5 degrees Celsius. Furthermore, it has been suggested that the global mean temperature may have already passed the 1.5 degrees Celsius level in 2024.

The Paris Agreement also seemed to have influenced the focus of the following IPCC reports. Before the Paris Agreement was settled, the IPCC assessment reports focused roughly in equal proportions on temperatures above and below 2 °C. However, in the 6th assessment report, after the Paris Engagement was reached, slightly less than 20% of the temperature mentions are above 2 °C and almost 50% focus on 1.5 °C alone.

== Awards ==
In 2016, the UNFCCC received the "Prince or Princess of Asturias Award for International Cooperation" by the Princess of Asturias Awards.

== Meetings of the Parties ==
A Conference of the Parties (COP) has been held annually for most years since 1995.

List of COPs of the UNFCCC
COP	Year	Country	Begin	End	Days	City	Link
COP1	1995	Germany	28.03.1995	07.04.1995	10	Berlin	[COP 1] (https://unfccc.int/process/bodies/conference-of-the-parties/cop-1)
COP2	1996	Switzerland	08.07.1996	19.07.1996	11	Geneva	[COP 2] (https://unfccc.int/process/bodies/conference-of-the-parties/cop-2)
COP3	1997	Japan	01.12.1997	10.12.1997	10	Kyoto	[COP 3] (https://unfccc.int/process/bodies/conference-of-the-parties/cop-3)
COP4	1998	Argentina	02.11.1998	13.11.1998	12	Buenos Aires	[COP 4] (https://unfccc.int/process/bodies/conference-of-the-parties/cop-4)
COP5	1999	Germany	25.10.1999	05.11.1999	12	Bonn	[COP 5] (https://unfccc.int/process/bodies/conference-of-the-parties/cop-5)
COP6	2000	Netherlands	13.11.2000	24.11.2000	12	The Hague	[COP 6] (https://unfccc.int/process/bodies/conference-of-the-parties/cop-6)
COP7	2001	Morocco	29.10.2001	10.11.2001	12	Marrakesh	[COP 7] (https://unfccc.int/process/bodies/conference-of-the-parties/cop-7)
COP8	2002	India	23.10.2002	01.11.2002	10	New Delhi	[COP 8] (https://unfccc.int/process/bodies/conference-of-the-parties/cop-8)
COP9	2003	Italy	01.12.2003	12.12.2003	12	Milan	[COP 9] (https://unfccc.int/process/bodies/conference-of-the-parties/cop-9)
COP10	2004	Argentina	01.12.2004	12.12.2004	12	Buenos Aires	[COP 10] (https://unfccc.int/process/bodies/conference-of-the-parties/cop-10)
COP11	2005	Canada	28.11.2005	10.12.2005	12	Montreal	[COP 11] (https://unfccc.int/process/bodies/conference-of-the-parties/cop-11)
COP12	2006	Kenya	06.11.2006	17.11.2006	12	Nairobi	[COP 12] (https://unfccc.int/process/bodies/conference-of-the-parties/cop-12)
COP13	2007	Indonesia	03.12.2007	15.12.2007	12	Bali	[COP 13] (https://unfccc.int/process/bodies/conference-of-the-parties/cop-13)
COP14	2008	Poland	01.12.2008	12.12.2008	12	Poznań	[COP 14] (https://unfccc.int/process/bodies/conference-of-the-parties/cop-14)
COP15	2009	Denmark	07.12.2009	18.12.2009	12	Copenhagen	[COP 15] (https://unfccc.int/process/bodies/conference-of-the-parties/cop-15)
COP16	2010	Mexico	29.11.2010	11.12.2010	12	Cancún	[COP 16] (https://unfccc.int/process/bodies/conference-of-the-parties/cop-16)
COP17	2011	South Africa	28.11.2011	11.12.2011	14	Durban	[COP 17] (https://unfccc.int/process/bodies/conference-of-the-parties/cop-17)
COP18	2012	Qatar	26.11.2012	08.12.2012	12	Doha	[COP 18] (https://unfccc.int/process/bodies/conference-of-the-parties/cop-18)
COP19	2013	Poland	11.11.2013	22.11.2013	12	Warsaw	[COP 19] (https://unfccc.int/process/bodies/conference-of-the-parties/cop-19)
COP20	2014	Peru	01.12.2014	12.12.2014	12	Lima	[COP 20] (https://unfccc.int/process/bodies/conference-of-the-parties/cop-20)
COP21	2015	France	30.11.2015	12.12.2015	12	Paris	[COP 21] (https://unfccc.int/process/bodies/conference-of-the-parties/cop-21)
COP22	2016	Morocco	07.11.2016	18.11.2016	12	Marrakesh	[COP 22] (https://unfccc.int/process/bodies/conference-of-the-parties/cop-22)
COP23	2017	Germany	06.11.2017	17.11.2017	12	Bonn	[COP 23] (https://unfccc.int/process/bodies/conference-of-the-parties/cop-23)
COP24	2018	Poland	02.12.2018	14.12.2018	12	Katowice	[COP 24] (https://unfccc.int/process/bodies/conference-of-the-parties/cop-24)
COP25	2019	Spain	02.12.2019	13.12.2019	12	Madrid	[COP 25] (https://unfccc.int/conference/un-climate-change-conference-december-2019)
COP26	2021	United Kingdom	31.10.2021	12.11.2021	12	Glasgow	[COP 26] (https://unfccc.int/conference/glasgow-climate-change-conference-october-november-2021)
COP27	2022	Egypt	06.11.2022	18.11.2022	12	Sharm el-Sheikh	[COP 27] (https://unfccc.int/cop27)
COP28	2023	United Arab Emirates	30.11.2023	12.12.2023	12	Dubai	[COP 28] (https://unfccc.int/cop28)
COP29	2024	Azerbaijan	11.11.2024	22.11.2024	12	Baku	[COP 29] (https://unfccc.int/cop29)
COP30	2025	Brazil	31.10.2025	12.11.2025	12	Belém	[COP 30] (https://unfccc.int/cop30)
COP31	2026	Turkey	09.11.2026	20.11.2026	12	Antalya	[COP 31] (https://unfccc.int/cop31)
COP32	2027	Ethiopia	TBD	TBD	12	Addis Ababa	[COP 32] (https://unfccc.int/cop32)

== See also ==
- Climate crisis – Term for the threat of climate change
- Climate justice – Concept for social justice in climate change context
- Climate target – Policy for emissions reductions
- Conference of the parties – Supreme governing body of an international convention
- United Nations Convention to Combat Desertification – International treaty on environmental protection
- Youth Advisory Group on Climate Change, established 2020
