= History of climate change policy and politics =

The history of climate change policy and politics refers to the continuing history of political actions, policies, trends, controversies and activist efforts as they pertain to the issue of climate change. Climate change emerged as a political issue in the 1970s, when activist and formal efforts sought to address environmental crises on a global scale. International policy regarding climate change has focused on cooperation and the establishment of international guidelines to address global warming. The United Nations Framework Convention on Climate Change (UNFCCC) is a largely accepted international agreement that has continuously developed to meet new challenges. Domestic policy on climate change has focused on both establishing internal measures to reduce greenhouse gas emissions and incorporating international guidelines into domestic law.

In the 21st century, there has been a shift towards vulnerability-based policy for those most impacted by environmental anomalies. Over the history of climate policy, concerns have been raised about the treatment of developing nations. Critical reflection on the history of climate change politics provides "ways to think about one of the most difficult issues we human beings have brought upon ourselves in our short life on the planet".

== History of climate change mitigation policies ==
Historically efforts to deal with climate change have taken place at a multinational level. They involve attempts to reach a consensus decision at the United Nations, under the United Nations Framework Convention on Climate Change (UNFCCC). This is the dominant approach historically of engaging as many international governments as possible in taking action on a worldwide public issue. The Montreal Protocol in 1987 is a precedent that this approach can work. But some critics say the top-down framework of only utilising the UNFCCC consensus approach is ineffective. They put forward counter-proposals of bottom-up governance. At this same time this would lessen the emphasis on the UNFCCC.

The Kyoto Protocol to the UNFCCC adopted in 1997 set out legally binding emission reduction commitments for the "Annex 1" countries. The Protocol defined three international policy instruments ("Flexibility Mechanisms") which could be used by the Annex 1 countries to meet their emission reduction commitments. According to Bashmakov, use of these instruments could significantly reduce the costs for Annex 1 countries in meeting their emission reduction commitments.

The Paris Agreement reached in 2015 succeeded the Kyoto Protocol which expired in 2020. Countries that ratified the Kyoto protocol committed to reduce their emissions of carbon dioxide and five other greenhouse gases, or engage in carbon emissions trading if they maintain or increase emissions of these gases.

In 2015, the UNFCCC's "structured expert dialogue" came to the conclusion that, "in some regions and vulnerable ecosystems, high risks are projected even for warming above 1.5 °C". Together with the strong diplomatic voice of the poorest countries and the island nations in the Pacific, this expert finding was the driving force leading to the decision of the 2015 Paris Climate Conference to lay down this 1.5 °C long-term target on top of the existing 2 °C goal.

== History of activism ==
Until the 19th century, Western thought traditionally cast nature, including the climate, as fundamentally unchanging, untouchable by human influence. Thinkers such as George Perkins Marsh, who wrote the 1864 book Man and Nature, began to change this narrative. Most of the early work done to draw attention to human impact on nature was more directly related to ecology than climate, such as Aldo Leopold's 1949 book A Sand County Almanac, but the idea that humans do affect ecosystems was important to the creation of the climate movement.

In 1962, Rachel Carson, a marine biologist, author, and environmental activist, wrote Silent Spring describing how pesticides contaminate the food chain, harm wildlife, and cause illnesses. The book served as a powerful exposé on the environmental devastation caused by indiscriminate pesticide use. Carson’s critique of the government's failure to protect public health and wildlife advanced the global environmental movement.

Since the early 1970s, climate activists have called for more effective political action regarding climate change and other environmental issues. In 1970, Earth Day was the first large-scale environmental movement that called for the protection of all life on earth. The Friends of Earth organization was also founded in 1970.

Activism related to climate change continued in the late 1980s, when major environmental organizations became involved in the discussions about climate, mainly in the UNFCCC framework. Environmental organizations had previously primarily been engaged at the domestic level, but they began to increasingly engage in international campaigning.

Even with the large public support for government action on climate change, there has been little sustained grassroots mobilization in the United States. Since Dr. James Hansen's 1988 testimony before Congress, the institutionalized U.S. climate movement has expanded significantly, supported by international initiatives such as the UNFCC, the 1997 Kyoto Protocol, and the 2009 Copenhagen summit. By 2010, over 460 organizations were involved in national climate efforts, yet large-scale citizen activism remained limited, revealing a gap between institutional progress and public engagement.

The largest transnational climate change coalition, Climate Action Network, was founded in 1992. Its major members include Greenpeace, WWF, Oxfam and Friends of the Earth. Climate Justice Now! and Climate Justice Action, two major coalitions, were founded in the lead-up to the 2009 Copenhagen Summit.

Between 2006 and 2009, the Campaign against Climate Change and other British organisations staged a series of demonstrations to encourage governments to make more serious attempts to address climate change.

The 2009 United Nations Climate Change Conference in Copenhagen was the first UNFCCC summit in which the climate movement started showing its mobilization power at a large scale. According to Jennifer Hadden, the number of new NGOs registered with the UNFCCC surged in 2009 in the lead-up to the Copenhagen summit. Between 40,000 and 100,000 people attended a march in Copenhagen on December 12 calling for a global agreement on climate. Activism went beyond Copenhagen, with more than 5,400 rallies and demonstrations took place around the world simultaneously.

In 2019, activists, most of whom were young people, participated in a global climate strike to criticise the lack of international and political action to address the worsening impacts of climate change. Greta Thunberg, a young activist from Sweden, became a figurehead for the School Strike For Climate movement.

== Development of political concern ==
Anthropogenic global warming—not global cooling or "imminent ice ages"—dominated peer-reviewed literature in the 1970s, contrary to false claims that climate science subsequently reversed its consensus.

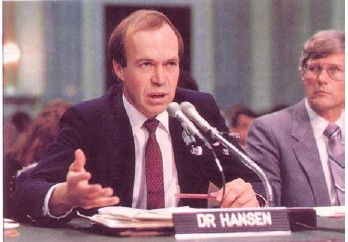
James Hansen testifying about climate change before United States Congress in 1988.

In the mid-1970s, climate change shifted from a solely scientific issue to a point of political concern. The formal political discussion of the global environment began in June 1972 with the UN Conference on the Human Environment (UNCHE) in Stockholm. The UNCHE identified the need for states to work cooperatively to solve environmental issues on a global scale.

The first World Climate Conference in 1979 framed climate change as a global political issue, giving way to similar conferences in 1985, 1987, and 1988. In 1985, the Advisory Group on Greenhouse Gases (AGGG) was formed to offer international policy recommendations regarding climate change and global warming. At the Toronto Conference on the Changing Atmosphere in 1988, climate change was suggested to be almost as serious as nuclear war and early targets for CO_{2} emission reductions were discussed.

The United Nations Environmental Programme (UNEP) and the World Meteorological Organisation (WMO) jointly established the Intergovernmental Panel on Climate Change (IPCC) in 1988. A succession of political summits in 1989, namely the Francophone Summit in Dakar, the Small Island States meeting, the G7 Meeting, the Commonwealth Summit, and the Non-Aligned Meeting, addressed climate change as a global political issue.

=== Partisan division ===
National political divides on the seriousness of climate change consistently correlate with political ideology, with right-wing opinion being more negative.

In the late 2000s, the political discourse regarding climate change policy became increasingly polarising. In the United States, the political right has largely opposed climate policy while the political left has favoured progressive action to address environmental anomalies. In a 2016 study, Dunlap, McCright, and Yarosh note the 'escalating polarisation of environmental protection and climate change' discourse in the USA. In 2020, the partisan gap in public opinion regarding the importance of climate change policy was the widest in history. The Pew Research Center found that, in 2020, 78% of Democrats and 21% of Republicans in the USA saw climate policy as a top priority to be addressed by the President and Congress.

In Europe, there is growing tension between right-wing interest in migration and left-wing climate advocacy as primary political concerns. The validity of climate change research and climate change denial have also become partisan issues in the United States. However, in the United Kingdom the right-wing Conservative Party set one of the first net zero goals in the world in 2019.

== Development of international policy ==
Through the creation of multilateral treaties, agreements, and frameworks, international policy on climate change seeks to establish a worldwide response to the impacts of global warming and environmental anomalies. Historically, these efforts culminated in attempts to reduce global greenhouse gas emissions on a country-by-country basis.

Parties to the UNFCCC as of 2016

In 1992, the United Nations Conference on Environment and Development (UNCED) was held in Rio de Janeiro. The United Nations Framework Convention on Climate Change (UNFCCC) was also introduced during the conference. The UNFCCC established the concept of common but differentiated responsibilities, defined Annex 1 and Annex 2 countries, highlighted the needs of vulnerable nations, and established a precautionary approach to climate policy. In accordance with the convention, the first session of the Conference of the Parties to the UNFCCC (COP-1) was held in Berlin in 1995.

In 1997, the third session of the Conference of the Parties (COP-3) passed the Kyoto Protocol, which contained the first legally binding greenhouse gas reduction targets. The Kyoto Protocol required Annex 1 countries to reduce greenhouse gas emissions by 5% from 1990 levels between 2008 and 2012.

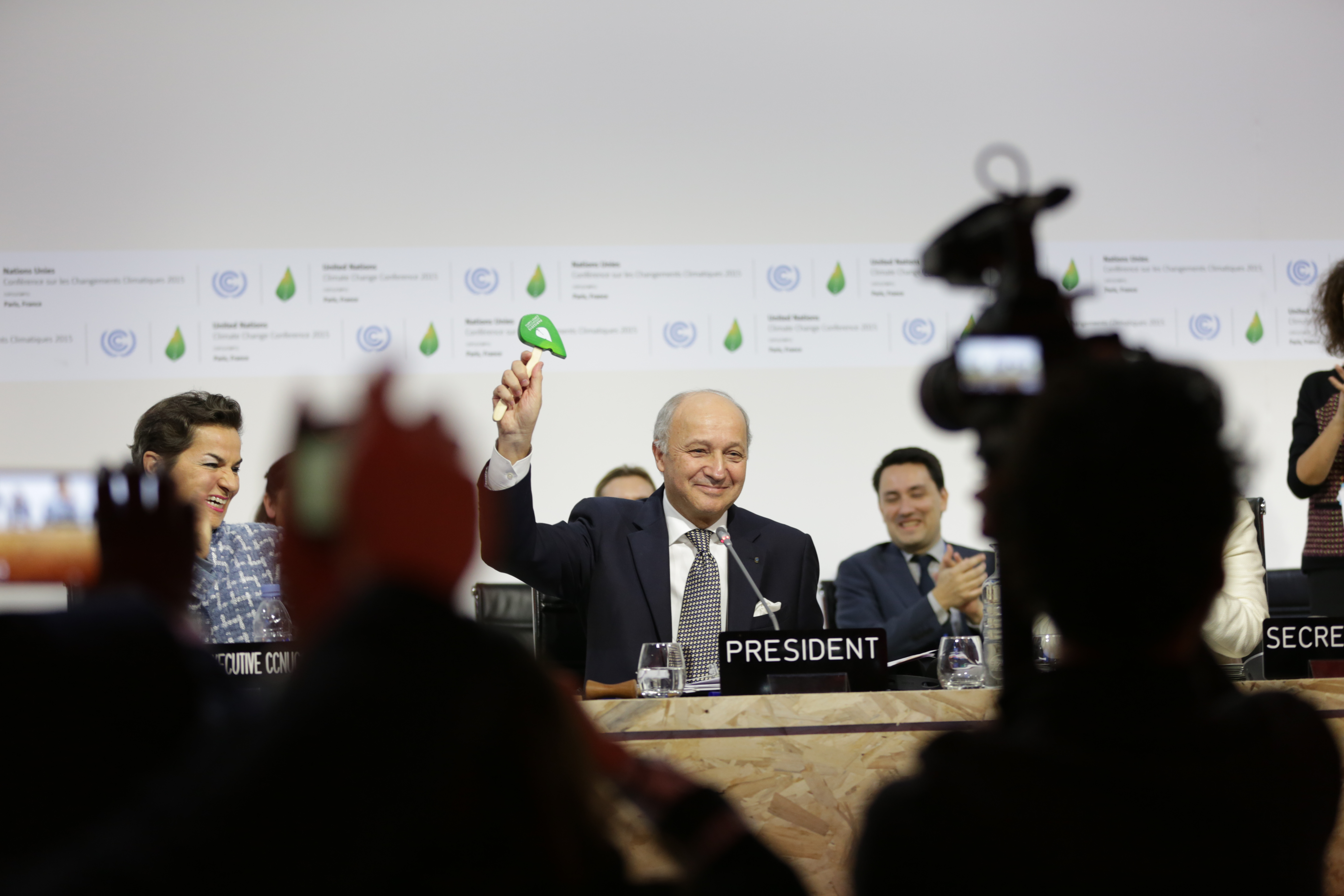
Adoption of Paris Agreement in 2015

At the 13th session of the Conference of the Parties (COP-13) in 2007, the Bali Action Plan was implemented to promote a shared vision for the Copenhagen Summit. The Action Plan called for Annex 2 nations to adopt Nationally Appropriate Mitigation Actions (NAMAs). The Bali Conference also raised awareness for the 20% of global greenhouse gas emissions caused by deforestation.

In 2009, the Copenhagen Accord was created at the 15th session of the Conference of the Parties (COP-15) in Copenhagen, Denmark. Although not legally binding, the Accord established an agreed-upon goal to keep global warming below two degrees Celsius.

The Paris Agreement was adopted at the 21st session of the Conference of the Parties (COP-21) on the 12th of December 2015. It entered into force on the 4th of November 2016. The agreement addressed greenhouse-gas-emissions mitigation, adaptation, and finance. Its language was negotiated by representatives of 196 state parties at COP-21. As of March 2019, 195 UNFCCC members have signed the agreement and 187 have become party to the agreement.

== History of climate change adaptation policies ==
When climate change first became prominent on the international political agenda in the early 1990s, talk of adaptation was considered an unwelcome distraction from the need to reach agreement on effective measures for mitigation – which has mainly meant reducing the emissions of greenhouse gases. A few voices had spoken out in favour of adaptation even in the late 20th and early 21st century. In 2009 and 2010, adaptation began to receive more attention during international climate negotiations. This was after limited progress at the Copenhagen Summit had made it clear that achieving international consensus for emission reductions would be more challenging than had been hoped. In 2009, the rich nations of the world committed to providing a total of $100 billion per year to help developing nations fund their climate adaptation projects. This commitment was underscored at the 2010 Cancún Summit, and again at the 2015 Paris Conference. The promise was not fulfilled, but the amount of funding provided by the rich nations for adaptations did increase over the 2010 – 2020 period.

Climate change adaptation has tended to be more of a focus for local authorities, while national and international politics has tended to focus on mitigation. There have been exceptions – in countries that feel especially exposed to the effects of climate change, sometimes the focus has been more on adaptation even at national level.

== History of climate change denial ==
=== Political pressure on scientists in the United States ===
==== Actions under the Bush Administration around 2007 ====
A survey of climate scientists which was reported to the US House Oversight and Government Reform Committee in 2007, noted "Nearly half of all respondents perceived or personally experienced pressure to eliminate the words 'climate change', 'global warming' or other similar terms from a variety of communications." These scientists were pressured to tailor their reports on global warming to fit the Bush administration's climate change denial. In some cases, this occurred at the request of former oil-industry lobbyist Phil Cooney, who worked for the American Petroleum Institute before becoming chief of staff at the White House Council on Environmental Quality (he resigned in 2005, before being hired by ExxonMobil). In June 2008, a report by NASA's Office of the Inspector General concluded that NASA staff appointed by the White House had censored and suppressed scientific data on global warming in order to protect the Bush administration from controversy close to the 2004 presidential election.

Officials, such as Philip Cooney repeatedly edited scientific reports from US government scientists, many of whom, such as Thomas Knutson, were ordered to refrain from discussing climate change and related topics.

Climate scientist James E. Hansen, director of NASA's Goddard Institute for Space Studies, wrote in a widely cited New York Times article in 2006, that his superiors at the agency were trying to "censor" information "going out to the public". NASA denied this, saying that it was merely requiring that scientists make a distinction between personal, and official government views, in interviews conducted as part of work done at the agency. When multiple scientists working at the National Oceanic and Atmospheric Administration made similar complaints; government officials again said they were enforcing long-standing policies requiring government scientists to clearly identify personal opinions as such when participating in public interviews and forums.

In 2006, the BBC current affairs program Panorama investigated the issue, and was told, "scientific reports about global warming have been systematically changed and suppressed."

According to an Associated Press release on 30 January 2007:

Climate scientists at seven government agencies say they have been subjected to political pressure aimed at downplaying the threat of global warming.

The groups presented a survey that shows two in five of the 279 climate scientists who responded to a questionnaire complained that some of their scientific papers had been edited in a way that changed their meaning. Nearly half of the 279 said in response to another question that at some point they had been told to delete reference to "global warming" or "climate change" from a report.

The survey was published as a joint report the Union of Concerned Scientists and the Government Accountability Project.

==== Politically motivated investigations into historic temperature reconstructions ====
In June 2005, Rep. Joe Barton, chairman of the House Committee on Energy and Commerce and Ed Whitfield, Chairman of the Subcommittee on Oversight and Investigations, sent letters to three scientists Michael E. Mann, Raymond S. Bradley and Malcolm K. Hughes as authors of the studies of the 1998 and 1999 historic temperature reconstructions (widely publicised as the "hockey stick graphs"). In the letters he demanded not just data and methods of the research, but also personal information about their finances and careers, information about grants provided to the institutions they had worked for, and the exact computer codes used to generate their results.

Sherwood Boehlert, chairman of the House Science Committee, told his fellow Republican Joe Barton it was a "misguided and illegitimate investigation" seemingly intended to "intimidate scientists rather than to learn from them, and to substitute congressional political review for scientific review". The U.S. National Academy of Sciences (NAS) president Ralph Cicerone wrote to Barton proposing that the NAS should appoint an independent panel to investigate. Barton dismissed this offer.

On 15 July, Mann wrote giving his detailed response to Barton and Whitfield. He emphasized that the full data and necessary methods information was already publicly available in full accordance with National Science Foundation (NSF) requirements, so that other scientists had been able to reproduce their work. NSF policy was that computer codes are considered the intellectual property of researchers and are not subject to disclosure, but notwithstanding these property rights, the program used to generate the original MBH98 temperature reconstructions had been made available at the Mann et al. public FTP site.

Many scientists protested Barton's demands. Alan I. Leshner wrote to him on behalf of the American Association for the Advancement of Science stating that the letters gave "the impression of a search for some basis on which to discredit these particular scientists and findings, rather than a search for understanding", He stated that Mann, Bradley and Hughes had given out their full data and descriptions of methods. A Washington Post editorial on 23 July which described the investigation as harassment quoted Bradley as saying it was "intrusive, far-reaching and intimidating", and Alan I. Leshner of the AAAS describing it as unprecedented in the 22 years he had been a government scientist; he thought it could "have a chilling effect on the willingness of people to work in areas that are politically relevant". Congressman Boehlert said the investigation was as "at best foolhardy" with the tone of the letters showing the committee's inexperience in relation to science.

Barton was given support by global warming sceptic Myron Ebell of the Competitive Enterprise Institute, who said "We've always wanted to get the science on trial ... we would like to figure out a way to get this into a court of law," and "this could work". In his Junk Science column on Fox News, Steven Milloy said Barton's inquiry was reasonable. In September 2005 David Legates alleged in a newspaper op-ed that the issue showed climate scientists not abiding by data access requirements and suggested that legislators might ultimately take action to enforce them.

Boehlert commissioned the U.S. National Academy of Sciences to appoint an independent panel which investigated the issues and produced the North Report which confirmed the validity of the science. At the same time, Barton arranged with statistician Edward Wegman to back up the attacks on the "hockey stick" reconstructions. The Wegman Report repeated allegations about disclosure of data and methods, but Wegman failed to provide the code and data used by his team, despite repeated requests, and his report was subsequently found to contain plagiarized content.

=== Climatic Research Unit email controversy (2009) ===
The Climatic Research Unit email controversy (also known as "Climategate") began in November 2009 with the hacking of a server at the Climatic Research Unit (CRU) at the University of East Anglia (UEA) by an external attacker, copying thousands of emails and computer files (the Climatic Research Unit documents) to various internet locations several weeks before the Copenhagen Summit on climate change.

The story was first broken by climate change denialists, who argued that the emails showed that global warming was a scientific conspiracy and that scientists manipulated climate data and attempted to suppress critics. The CRU rejected this, saying that the emails had been taken out of context. FactCheck.org reported that climate change deniers misrepresented the contents of the emails. Columnist James Delingpole popularised the term "Climategate" to describe the controversy.

The mainstream media picked up the story, as negotiations over climate change mitigation began in Copenhagen on 7 December 2009. Because of the timing, scientists, policy makers and public relations experts said that the release of emails was a smear campaign intended to undermine the climate conference. In response to the controversy, the American Association for the Advancement of Science (AAAS), the American Meteorological Society (AMS) and the Union of Concerned Scientists (UCS) released statements supporting the scientific consensus that the Earth's mean surface temperature had been rising for decades, with the AAAS concluding: "based on multiple lines of scientific evidence that global climate change caused by human activities is now underway... it is a growing threat to society".

Eight committees investigated the allegations and published reports, finding no evidence of fraud or scientific misconduct. The scientific consensus that global warming is occurring as a result of human activity remained unchanged throughout the investigations.

== See also ==
- Climate change mitigation
- Individual action on climate change
- Politics of climate change
