= Climate and Clean Air Coalition to Reduce Short-Lived Climate Pollutants =

Climate and Clean Air Coalition (CCAC)

- Abbreviation: CCAC
- Formation: 16 February 2012; 14 years ago
- Type: Programme
- Legal status: Active
- Headquarters: Paris, France
- Website: ccacoalition.org

The Climate and Clean Air Coalition (CCAC) is a voluntary partnership of over 200 governments, intergovernmental organizations, businesses, scientific institutions and civil society organizations committed to protecting the climate and improving air quality through actions to reduce the super pollutants which are short-lived in the atmosphere: methane, black carbon, tropospheric ozone and HFCs, through a practical, measures-based approach. It was launched by the United Nations Environment Programme (UNEP) and six countries—Bangladesh, Canada, Ghana, Mexico, Sweden, and the United States—on 16 February 2012. The program is managed out of the United Nations Environmental Programme through a Secretariat in Paris, France.

== Short-lived climate pollutants ==
Short-lived climate pollutants (SLCPs) have a relatively short lifetime in the atmosphere – a few days to a few decades – and a powerful warming influence on climate. The main short-lived climate pollutants are black carbon, methane and tropospheric ozone, which are the most important contributors to the human enhancement of the global greenhouse effect after CO_{2}. These short-lived climate pollutants are also dangerous air pollutants, with various detrimental impacts on human health, agriculture and ecosystems. Other short-lived climate pollutants include some hydrofluorocarbons (HFCs). While HFCs are currently present in small quantities in the atmosphere, their contribution to climate forcing is projected to climb to as much as 19% of global CO_{2} emissions by 2050.

Black carbon is a major component of soot and is produced by incomplete combustion of fossil fuel and biomass. It is emitted from various sources including diesel cars and trucks, ships, residential stoves, forest fires, agricultural open burning and some industrial facilities. It has a warming impact on climate 460–1500 times stronger than CO_{2}. Its lifetime varies from a few days to a few weeks. When deposited on ice and snow, black carbon causes both atmospheric warming and an increase in melting rate. It also influences cloud formation and impacts regional circulation and rainfall patterns. In addition, black carbon impacts human health. It is a primary component of particulate matter in air pollution that is the major environmental cause of premature death globally.

Methane (CH_{4}) is a greenhouse gas that is over 20 times more potent than CO_{2}, and has an atmospheric lifetime of about 12 years. It is produced through natural processes (i.e. the decomposition of plant and animal waste), but is also emitted from many man-made sources, including coal mines, natural gas and oil systems, and landfills. Methane directly influences the climate system and also has indirect impacts on human health and ecosystems, in particular through its role as a precursor of tropospheric ozone.

HFCs are man-made greenhouse gases used in air conditioning, refrigeration, solvents, foam-blowing agents, and aerosols. Many HFCs remain in the atmosphere for less than 15 years. Though they represent a small fraction of the current total greenhouse gases (less than one percent), their warming impact is particularly strong and, if left unchecked, HFCs could account for nearly 20 percent of climate pollution by 2050.

Tropospheric or ground-level ozone (O_{3}) is the ozone present in the lowest portion of the atmosphere (up to 10–15 km above the ground). It is responsible for a large part of the human enhancement of the global greenhouse effect and has a lifetime of a few days to a few weeks. It is not directly emitted but formed by sunlight-driven oxidation of other agents, called ozone precursors, in particular, methane (CH_{4}) but also carbon monoxide (CO), non-methane volatile organic compounds (NMVOCs) and nitrogen oxides (NO_{x}). Tropospheric ozone is a harmful pollutant that has detrimental impacts on human health and plants and is responsible for important reductions in crop yields.

=== Potential results of SLCP mitigation ===
Health. Action to reduce SLCPs has the potential to achieve multiple benefits. For example, each year, more than 6 million people die prematurely from indoor and outdoor air pollution. Short-lived climate pollutants are largely to blame. Fast actions on short-lived climate pollutants, such as the widespread adoption of advanced cook stoves and clean fuels, have the potential to prevent over 2 million of premature deaths each year.

Agriculture. Reducing methane and black carbon could also prevent major crop losses. Present-day global relative yield losses due to tropospheric ozone exposure range between 7–12 percent for wheat, 6–16 percent for soybean, 3–4 percent for rice, and 3–5 percent for maize. In addition, black carbon influences the formation of clouds that have a negative effect on photosynthesis that impacts plant growth. Rapidly reducing short-lived climate pollutants, for instance through the collection of landfill gas or the recovery of methane from coal mines, has the potential to avoid the annual loss of more than 30 million tons of crops.

Climate. Reducing SLCPs could slow down the warming expected by 2050 by about 0.4 to 0.5 °C, almost halving projected near-term warming as compared to a baseline scenario. However, this applies to the simultaneous reduction of short and long-lived climate forcers. Reducing short-lived climate forcers without reducing long-lived emissions, especially CO_{2}, would not substantially reduce the amount of warming beyond some decades. Therefore, long-term climate change mitigation implies that the reduction in emissions of long-lived forcers cannot be replaced with the reduction in short-lived forcers. This is a risk in a framework of emission trading and/or objectives based on aggregated emissions, which implies that reducing a certain amount of a given forcer is equivalent to reducing another amount of another forcer.

SLCP reduction is likely to have enhanced climate benefits in many vulnerable regions, such as elevated snow- and ice-covered regions, and is also likely to reduce regional disruption of traditional rainfall patterns.

Though HFCs currently represent a small fraction of total greenhouse gases, their warming impact is particularly strong, and their emissions are projected to increase nearly twentyfold in the next three decades if their growth is not reduced. The most commonly used HFC is HFC-134a, which is 1,430 times more damaging to the climate system then carbon dioxide.

HFC emissions could offset much of the climate benefits from the Montreal Protocol. They are projected to rise to about 3.5 to 8.8 Gt CO_{2}eq in 2050, comparable to total current annual emissions from transport, estimated at around 6–7 Gt annually. There are options available that could avoid or replace high-GWP HFCs in many sectors and also ways to reduce emissions.

== Objectives ==
The Coalition's objectives are to address short-lived climate pollutants by:

- Raising awareness of short-lived climate pollutant impacts and mitigation strategies;
- Enhancing and developing new national and regional actions, including by identifying and overcoming barriers, enhancing capacity, and mobilizing support;
- Promoting best practices and showcasing successful efforts; and
- Improving scientific understanding of short-lived climate pollutant impacts and mitigation strategies.

== Actions ==
Specifically, WP:ELLIST states ... lists themselves should not be composed of external links.

Since its launch in February 2012, the Coalition has been working to identify actions that will help bring the health, agricultural, environmental and climate benefits of reducing SLCPs. As of March 2014 the CCAC has undertaken ten initiatives:

Reducing Black Carbon Emissions from Heavy Duty Diesel Vehicles and Engines
Working to reduce the climate and health impacts of black carbon and particulate matter (PM) emissions, particularly in the transport sector. A Green Freight Call to Action was issued in late 2013.

Mitigating Black Carbon and Other Pollutants From Brick Production
Addressing emissions of black carbon and other pollutants from brick production to reduce the harmful climate, air pollution, economic, and social impacts from the sector

Mitigating SLCPs from the Municipal Solid Waste Sector
Addressing methane, black carbon, and other air pollutant emissions across the municipal solid waste sector through work with cities and national governments

Promoting HFC Alternative Technology and Standards Targeting governments and the private sector in an effort to address rapidly growing HFC emissions

Accelerating Methane and Black Carbon Reductions from Oil and Natural Gas Production Working with key stakeholders to encourage cooperation and support the implementation of new and existing measures to substantially reduce methane emissions from natural gas venting, leakage, and flaring. The CCAC Oil and Gas Methane Partnership, involving the public sector and private companies, is expected to be launched in 2014.

Addressing SLCPs from Agriculture Aiming to reduce emissions of methane and black carbon from the agricultural sector, not only helping to address climate change but also to strengthen food security

Reducing SLCPs from Household Cooking and Domestic Heating
Working through advocacy and education to raise awareness of the harmful effect of emissions from this sector on human health climate, agriculture and climate

Cross-cutting efforts

The Coalition has also identified cross-cutting efforts to be undertaken in order to accelerate emissions reductions across all short-lived climate pollutants. To date these actions are:

Financing of SLCP mitigation In order to take advantage of all mitigation opportunities, this initiative seeks to act as a catalyst of scaled-up SLCP mitigation financing and will work with governments, the private sector, donors, financial institutions, expert groups and investors’ networks to bolster these financial flows.

Supporting NAtional Planning for action on SLCPs (SNAP) This initiative has developed a program to support national action plans for SLCPs, including national inventory development, building on existing air quality, climate change and development agreements, and assessment, prioritization, and demonstration of promising SLCP mitigation measures.

Regional Assessments of SLCPs The CCAC believes there is a need for in-depth assessments of SLCPs in key regions to help shape regional cooperation as well as the action of national governments, and to encourage new action. The Latin American and Caribbean region is the first target for this initiative.

== Partners ==
=== Founding partners ===
- United Nations Environment Programme
- United States ($6 million USD initial donation $2.5 million USD in 2013)
- Bangladesh
- Canada ($3 million USD initial donation, $10 million USD CAD in 2013)
- Ghana
- Mexico
- Sweden ($1.7 million USD initial donation, $2.5 million USD in 2013)

=== Additional donor countries (received and pledged as of February 2014) ===
- Denmark ($1.8 million USD)
- EU ($1.4 million USD)
- Germany ($0.4 million USD)
- Japan ($5.4 million USD)
- Netherlands ($0.5 million USD)
- Norway ($11.8 million USD)

=== Country partners (March 2014) ===
- Australia
- Benin
- Canada
- Central African Republic
- Chile
- Colombia
- Cote d'Ivoire
- Denmark
- Dominican Republic
- Ethiopia
- Finland
- France
- Germany
- Ghana
- India
- Ireland
- Israel
- Italy
- Japan
- Jordan
- Korea, Republic of
- Maldives
- Mexico
- Morocco
- Netherlands
- New Zealand
- Nigeria
- Norway
- Peru
- Poland
- Russian Federation
- Sweden
- United Kingdom
- United States
- EU

=== Non-state partners (March 2014) ===
- Bellona Foundation
- C40 Cities Climate Leadership Group
- Center for Clean Air Policy
- Centre for Science and Environment (CSE)
- ClimateWorks Foundation
- Earthjustice
- Environmental Defense Fund
- Environmental Investigation Agency
- Global Alliance for Clean Cookstoves
- International Centre for Integrated Mountain Development
- International Climate Change Partnership (ICCP)
- International Council on Clean Transportation
- International Institute for Sustainable Development
- International Solid Waste Association (ISWA)
- International Union of Air Pollution Prevention and Environmental Protection Associations
- Local Governments for Sustainability (ICLEI)
- Natural Resources Defense Council
- Nordic Environment Finance Corporation (NEFCO)
- Stockholm Environment Institute
- Swiss Foundation for Technical Cooperation (Swisscontact)
- United Nations Development Programme (UNDP)
- United Nations Environment Programme (UNEP)
- United Nations Industrial Development Organization (UNIDO)
- World Bank
- World Health Organization

== See also ==
- Climate and Clean Air Coalition to Reduce Short-Lived Climate Pollutants
- United Nations Framework Convention on Climate Change and accompanying Kyoto Protocol (CO2 Regulations)
- 2013 United Nations Climate Change Conference
- 2012 United Nations Climate Change Conference
- 2011 United Nations Climate Change Conference
- Post–Kyoto Protocol negotiations on greenhouse gas emissions
- Green Climate Fund
- Vienna Convention for the Protection of the Ozone Layer and accompanying Montreal Protocol (Ozone Regulation – Context)
