= Center for Clean Air Policy =

Independent, nonprofit think tank

- Abbreviation: CCAP
- Formation: 1985
- Type: Nonprofit think tank
- Headquarters: Washington, DC, United States
- Executive Director: Allison Bender-Corbett
- Revenue: $1,079,684 (2021)
- Expenses: $1,257,959 (2021)
- Website: ccap.org

The Center for Clean Air Policy (CCAP) is an independent, nonprofit think tank that was founded in 1985 in the United States and is headquartered in Washington, D.C. CCAP works on climate and air quality policy issues at the local, national and international levels.

== Overview ==
CCAP was founded by Ned Helme, a researcher and environmental policy advocate. The organization’s mission statement is "to support every step of climate action, from ambition to implementation."

From 2016 to 2023, CCAP worked to develop and implement Colombia's transit-oriented development NAMA. Additionally, CCAP currently serves as an observer actor for the Green Climate Fund and is a partner of the Climate and Clean Air Coalition (CCAC).
