= Clean Production Agreement =

Chilean environmental soft instrument

The Clean Production Agreement (CPA) is a Chilean environmental soft instrument that seeks to implement the cleaner production using productive promotion. Since 2012 the CPA are a recognized NAMA

In Chile, the promotion of cleaner production is promoted and coordinated by the National Council for Clean Production (NCCP), an institution under the Ministry of Economy. One of the goals of NCCP for 2020 is to contribute to reducing greenhouse gases through its main management instrument, the Clean Production Agreement (CPA). This voluntary agreement is negotiated and signed by the representative of the industrial organization on behalf of the companies in a particular productive sector and a public administration sector.

The agreement is intended to implement clean production through goals and actions within a specified period. This instrument is backed by specific national legislation (DS No. 20416/2010 ), and by the National Standards Institute, which has developed a set of rules (NCh2796‐Of2003, NCh2797‐Of2009, NCh2807‐Of2009, NCh2825‐Of2009) in order to create the framework for its creation, implementation and certification.

A CPA is a standard that sets goals and specific actions to be implemented by a productive sector, mainly based on the best available techniques in the market.

This instrument is funded by the government of Chile, which will financing about 70% of the costs covering the sustainability diagnosis of the sector, internal audits, technical assistance, training, certification, impact study and overall coordination of the CPA. The remaining 30% is funded by the sector, specifically the private companies who sign the CPAs.

Nevertheless, the funding granted by the NCCP does not provide support for the purchase and acquisition of technology.
