= Copenhagen Accord =

International agreement to fight global warming

The Copenhagen Accord is a document which delegates at the 15th session of the Conference of Parties (COP 15) to the United Nations Framework Convention on Climate Change agreed to "take note of" at the final plenary on 18 December 2009.

The Accord, drafted by, on the one hand, the United States and on the other, in a united position as the BASIC countries (Brazil, South Africa, India, and China), is not legally binding and does not commit countries to agree to a binding successor to the Kyoto Protocol, whose round ended in 2012.

== Summary ==
The Accord:

- Endorses the continuation of the Kyoto Protocol.
- Underlines that climate change is one of the greatest challenges of our time and emphasises a "strong political will to urgently combat climate change in accordance with the principle of common but differentiated responsibilities and respective capabilities"
- To prevent dangerous anthropogenic interference with the climate system, recognizes "the scientific view that the increase in global temperature should be below 2 degrees Celsius", in a context of sustainable development, to combat climate change.
- Recognizes "the critical impacts of climate change and the potential impacts of response measures on countries particularly vulnerable to its adverse effects" and stresses "the need to establish a comprehensive adaptation programme including international support"
- Recognizes that "deep cuts in global emissions are required according to science" (IPCC AR4) and agrees cooperation in peaking (stopping from rising) global and national greenhouse gas emissions "as soon as possible" and that "a low-emission development strategy is indispensable to sustainable development"
- States that "enhanced action and international cooperation on adaptation is urgently required to... reduce vulnerability and build.. resilience in developing countries, especially in those that are particularly vulnerable, especially least developed countries (LDCs), small island developing states (SIDS) and Africa" and agrees that "developed countries shall provide adequate, predictable and sustainable financial resources, technology and capacity-building to support the implementation of adaptation action in developing countries"
- For mitigation purposes, agrees that developed countries (Annex I Parties) would "commit to economy-wide emissions targets for 2020", to be submitted by 31 January 2010, and agrees that these Parties to the Kyoto Protocol would strengthen their existing targets. Delivery of reductions and finance by developed countries will be measured, reported and verified (MRV) in accordance with COP guidelines.
- Agrees that developing nations (non-Annex I Parties) would "implement mitigation actions" (Nationally Appropriate Mitigation Actions) to slow growth in their carbon emissions, submitting these by 31 January 2010. LDS and SIDS may undertake actions voluntarily and on the basis of (international) support.
- Agrees that developing countries would report those actions once every two years via the U.N. climate change secretariat, subjected to their domestic MRV. NAMAs seeking international support will be subject to international MRV
- Recognizes "the crucial role of reducing emission from deforestation and forest degradation and the need to enhance removals of greenhouse gas emission by forests", and the need to establish a mechanism (including REDD-plus) to enable the mobilization of financial resources from developed countries to help achieve this
- Decides to pursue opportunities to use markets to enhance the cost-effectiveness of, and to promote, mitigation actions.
- Developing countries, especially these with low-emitting economies should be provided incentives to continue to develop on a low-emission pathway
- States that "scaled up, new and additional, predictable and adequate funding as well as improved access shall be provided to developing countries... to enable and support enhanced action"
- Agrees that developed countries would raise funds of $30 billion from 2010–2012 of new and additional resources
- Agrees a "goal" for the world to raise $100 billion per year by 2020, from "a wide variety of sources", to help developing countries cut carbon emissions (mitigation). New multilateral funding for adaptation will be delivered, with a governance structure.
- Establishes a Copenhagen Green Climate Fund, as an operating entity of the financial mechanism, "to support projects, programme, policies and other activities in developing countries related to mitigation". To this end, creates a High Level Panel
- Establishes a Technology Mechanism "to accelerate technology development and transfer...guided by a country-driven approach"
- Calls for "an assessment of the implementation of the Accord to be completed by 2015. This would include consideration of strengthening the long-term goal", for example to limit temperature rises to 1.5 degrees.

== Emissions pledges ==
To date, countries representing over 80% of global emissions have engaged with the Copenhagen Accord. 31 January 2010 was an initial deadline set under the Accord for countries to submit emissions reduction targets, however UNFCCC Secretary Yvo De Boer later clarified that this was a "soft deadline". Countries continue to submit pledges past this deadline. A selection of reduction targets is shown below. All are for the year 2020.

Compared to 1990:

- EU: 20% – 30%
- Japan: 25%
- Russia: 15% – 25%
- Ukraine: 20%

Compared to 2000:

- Australia: 5% – 25%

Compared to 2005:

- Canada: 17%
- US: 17%

Compared to business as usual:

- Brazil: 36.1% – 38.9%
- Indonesia: 26%
- Mexico: 30%
- South Africa: 34%
- South Korea: 30%

Carbon intensity compared to 2005:

- China: 40% – 45%
- India: 20% – 25%

China also promised to increase the share of non-fossil fuels in primary energy consumption to around 15% by 2020, and increase forest coverage by 40 million hectares and forest stock volume by 1.3 billion cubic meters by 2020 from the 2005 levels.

== Responses ==
- The G77 said that the Accord would only secure the economic security of a few nations.
- Australia was happy overall but "wanted more".
- India was "pleased", while noting that the Accord "did not constitute a mandate for future commitment".
- United States said that the agreement would need to be built on in the future, and that "We've come a long way but we have much further to go."
- United Kingdom said "We have made a start" but that the agreement needed to become legally binding quickly. Gordon Brown also accused a small number of nations of holding the Copenhagen talks to ransom.
- China's delegation said that "The meeting has had a positive result, everyone should be happy." Wen Jiabao, China's premier, said that the weak agreement was due to distrust between nations: "To meet the climate change challenge, the international community must strengthen confidence, build consensus, make vigorous efforts and enhance co-operation."
- Brazil's climate change ambassador called the agreement "disappointing".
- Representatives of the Bolivarian Alliance for the Americas (mainly Venezuela, Bolivia, and Cuba), Sudan, and Tuvalu were unhappy with the outcome.
- Bolivian president, Evo Morales said that, "The meeting has failed. It's unfortunate for the planet. The fault is with the lack of political will by a small group of countries led by the US."

== Analysis ==
US Embassy dispatches released by whistleblowing site WikiLeaks showed how the US 'used spying, threats and promises of aid' to gain support for the Copenhagen Accord. The emergent US emissions pledge was the lowest by any leading nation.

The BBC immediately reported that the status and legal implications of the Copenhagen Accord were unclear. Tony Tujan of the IBON Foundation suggests the failure of Copenhagen may prove useful, if it allows us to unravel some of the underlying misconceptions and work towards a new, more holistic view of things. This could help gain the support of developing countries. Lumumba Stansilaus Di-Aping, UN Ambassador from Sudan, has indicated that, in its current form, the Accord "is not sufficient to move forward on", and that a new architecture is needed which is just and equitable.

=== Effect on emissions ===
In February 2010, a panel discussion was held at MIT, where Henry Jacoby presented the results of an analysis of the pledges made in the Accord. According to his analysis, assuming that the pledges submitted in response to the Accord (as of February 2010) are fulfilled, global emissions would peak around 2020. The resultant stock of emissions was projected to exceed the level required to have a roughly 50% chance of meeting the 2 °C target that is specified in the Accord. Jacoby measured the 2 °C target against pre-industrial temperature levels. According to Jacoby, even emission reductions below that needed to reach the 2 °C target still had the benefit of reducing the risk of large magnitudes of future climate change.

In March 2010, Nicholas Stern gave a talk at the London School of Economics on the outcome of Copenhagen conference. Stern said that he was disappointed with the outcome of the conference, but saw the Accord as a possible improvement on "business-as-usual" greenhouse gas (GHG) emissions. In his assessment, to have a reasonable chance of meeting the 2 °C target, the preferred emissions level in 2020 would be around 44 gigatons. The voluntary pledges made in the Accord (at that date) would, according to his projection, be above this, nearer to 50 gigatons. In this projection, Stern assumed that countries would fulfil the commitments they had made. Stern compared this projection to a "business-as-usual" emissions path (i.e., the emissions that might have occurred without the Accord). His estimate of "business-as-usual" suggested that without the Accord, emissions might have been above 50 gigatons in 2020.

A study published in the journal Environmental Research Letters found that the Accord's voluntary commitments would probably result in a dangerous increase in the global average temperature of 4.2 °C over the next century.

The International Energy Agency (IEA) publication, World Energy Outlook 2010, contains a scenario based on the voluntary pledges made in the Copenhagen Accord. In the IEA scenario, it is assumed that these pledges are acted on cautiously, reflecting their non-binding nature. In this scenario, GHG emission trends follow a path which is consistent with a stabilization of GHGs at 650 parts per million (ppm) CO_{2}-equivalent in the atmosphere. In the long-term, a 650 ppm concentration could lead to global warming of 3.5 °C above the pre-industrial global average temperature level.

World Energy Outlook 2010 suggests another scenario consistent with having a reasonable chance of limiting global warming to 2 °C above the pre-industrial level. In the IEA's scenario, GHG emissions are reduced so as to stabilize the concentration of GHGs in the atmosphere at 450 ppm CO_{2}-eq. This scenario sees countries making vigorous efforts to cut their GHG emissions up to the year 2020, with even stronger action taken thereafter.

A preliminary assessment published in November 2010 by the United Nations Environment Programme (UNEP) suggests a possible "emissions gap" between the voluntary pledges made in the Accord and the emissions cuts necessary to have a "likely" (greater than 66% probability) chance of meeting the 2 °C objective. The UNEP assessment takes the 2 °C objective as being measured against the pre-industrial global mean temperature level. To having a likely chance of meeting the 2 °C objective, assessed studies generally indicated the need for global emissions to peak before 2020, with substantial declines in emissions thereafter.

== Criticism ==
Concerns over the Accord exist; some of the key criticisms include:

- The Accord itself is not legally binding.
- No decision was taken on whether to agree a legally binding successor or complement to the Kyoto Protocol.
- The Accord sets no real targets to achieve in emissions reductions.
- The Accord was drafted by only five countries.
- The deadline for assessment of the Accord was drafted as 6 years, by 2015.
- The mobilisation of 100 billion dollars per year to developing countries will not be fully in place until 2020.
- There is no guarantee or information on where the climate funds will come from.
- There is no agreement on how much individual countries would contribute to or benefit from any funds.
- COP delegates only "took note" of the Accord rather than adopting it.
- The head of the G77 has said it will only secure the economic security of a few nations.
- There is not an international approach to technology.
- The Accord appears to "forget" fundamental sectoral mitigation, such as transportation.
- It shows biases in silent ways such as the promotion of incentives on low gas-emitting countries.

== See also ==
- 2009 United Nations Climate Change Conference
- 2010 United Nations Climate Change Conference
- 350.org
- Anote Tong
- Bali Road Map
- Carbon footprint
- Climate change
- Climate debt
- Global warming
- Kyoto Protocol
- Measurement, reporting and verification (MRV)
- Net Capacity Factor
- Paris Agreement
- Post–Kyoto Protocol negotiations on greenhouse gas emissions
