= Action for Climate Empowerment =

Action for Climate Empowerment (ACE) is a term adopted by the United Nations Framework Convention on Climate Change (UNFCCC). It refers to Article 6 of the Convention's original text (1992), focusing on six priority areas: education, training, public awareness, public participation, public access to information, and international cooperation on these issues. The implementation of all six areas has been identified as the pivotal factor for everyone to understand and participate in solving the complex challenges presented by climate change. The importance of ACE is reflected in other international frameworks such as the Sustainable Development Goals (SDGs, 2015); the Global Action Programme for Education for Sustainable Development (GAP on ESD, 2014); the Aarhus Convention (2011); the Escazú Agreement (2018) and the Bali Guidelines (2010).

ACE calls on governments to develop and implement educational and public awareness programmes, train scientific, technical and managerial personnel, foster access to information, and promote public participation in addressing climate change and its effects. It also urges countries to cooperate in this process, by exchanging good practices and lessons learned, and strengthening national institutions. This wide scope of activities is guided by specific objectives that, together, are seen as crucial for effectively implementing climate adaptation and mitigation actions, and for achieving the ultimate objective of the UNFCCC.

== History ==
Article 6 has been part of the UNFCCC since the Convention's text was adopted on 9 May 1992. The importance of international cooperation in achieving Article 6 was emphasised in Article 10(e) of the Kyoto Protocol, adopted in 1997. In New Delhi, 2002, the eighth Conference of the Parties (COP 8) adopted the 'New Delhi Work Programme' (2002–2007) – to serve as a flexible framework for country-driven action on Article 6 in addressing the specific needs and circumstances of Parties, and reflecting their national priorities and initiatives. In 2007, COP 13 (in Bali) amended the New Delhi work programme and extended it for five years (2007-2012) and requested that regional workshops be organized by the UNFCCC secretariat as part of the review of the work programme, and to share lessons learned and best practices. Workshops were held in Europe (2009), Asia and the Pacific (2009), Small Island Developing States (2010), Africa (2010), and Latin America and the Caribbean (2010).

In Doha, 2012, COP 18 adopted the eight-year Doha Work Programme on Article 6 of the UNFCCC (2012-2020). This programme invites Parties to designate and provide support, including technical and financial support, and access to information and materials to a National Focal Point for Article 6 of the UNFCCC. Furthermore, Parties agreed to organize an annual in-session Dialogue on Article 6 of the UNFCCC to present and enhance the relevant work. Since 2013, the annual Dialogue has provided a platform for Parties, representatives of relevant bodies established under the UNFCCC and relevant experts, practitioners and stakeholders to share their experiences and exchange ideas, best practices and lessons learned regarding the implementation of the Doha Work Programme.

In June 2015, at the 3rd annual dialogue on Article 6 in Bonn, it was decided that efforts related to the implementation of Article 6 would be referred to as Action for Climate Empowerment (ACE): a user-friendly, and unmistakable term for referring to Article 6 of the UNFCCC, as opposed to the very important Article 6 of the Paris Agreement. COP 20 in Lima, December 2014 adopted the 'Lima Ministerial Declaration on Education and Awareness-raising', reaffirming the importance of Article 6 of the UNFCCC in meeting its ultimate objective and in promoting climate-resilient sustainable development. In 2015 at COP 21 (Paris) governments agreed to cooperate in taking measures, as appropriate, to enhance climate change-related education, training, public awareness, public participation and public access to information, recognizing the importance of these steps to enhance actions under the Paris Agreement. In 2016, the 4th annual dialogue on ACE was held in Bonn and the intermediate review of the Doha Work Programme was completed. The final review of the Doha Work Programme will be carried out in 2020. The 5th annual dialogue on ACE was held in Bonn on the 15 and 16 May with the topics 'education', 'training' and 'international cooperation'.

The Glasgow work programme on Action for Climate Empowerment was approved at COP26, a framework that will now guide national work on ACE. It contains four priority areas:

1. Policy Coherence
2. Coordinated Action
3. Tools and Support
4. Monitoring, Evaluation, and Reporting

Parties will now engage in designing action plans to implement this work both globally and within their respective nations. Work leading into the formation of the Glasgow work programme highlighted the intersectional issues of justice; however, not all of these were implemented within the official document that was agreed to at COP26.

== The six elements of ACE ==
ACE addresses all six priority areas of Article 6: education, training, public awareness, public access to information, public participation, international cooperation. Education enables people to understand the causes and consequences of climate change, to make informed decisions and to take appropriate actions to address climate change. Training provides the technical skills and advanced knowledge needed to support the transition to green economies and sustainable, climate-resilient societies. Successful public awareness campaigns engage communities and individuals in the common effort needed to carry out national and international climate change policies. Ensuring public participation in decision-making and public access to information provides people with the tools and opportunities they need to play a more active role. These elements can all be strengthened through international cooperation. Governments and organizations can support each other with resources, ideas and inspiration for developing climate action programmes.

== Guiding principles for ACE activities ==
Section B (14) of the Doha Work Programme provides guiding principles on the approach to and characteristics of ACE activities. While all 9 points listed in Section B (14) are important, it is pertinent to emphasize (d), adopting a gender and intergenerational approach.

=== A gender approach ===
A gender approach means ensuring that climate actions are gender-responsive and promote women's participation in decision-making. While women make up approximately 50% of the world population, in many countries women are less able to cope with – and are more exposed to – the adverse effects of climate change because they have lesser economic, political and legal clout. Therefore, supporting women's empowerment and drawing on their experiences, knowledge and skills will make climate change responses more effective.

=== Intergenerational ===
Intergenerational refers to engaging people of all ages in finding solutions for climate change, taking into special consideration the vulnerabilities of youth and the elderly, who have a reduced capacity to cope independently. Future generations are likely to be the most vulnerable to the impacts of climate change, yet they are also the least represented in current decisions on climate action. At the same time, the world population is ageing very quickly. By 2050 approximately one in five people will be over the age of 60; the number of those aged 80 and older is expected to quadruple. In addition to youth and the elderly, other vulnerable people such as women and traditionally marginalized groups (such as indigenous peoples, ethnic minorities and people with disabilities) have limited capacity to engage in policy-making, and risk being overlooked if their needs are not explicitly included in planning. Formal decision-making structures strive to ensure the participation of those most vulnerable and least represented, recognizing that specialized efforts need to be invested in engaging vulnerable communities.

Despite ACE's nine guiding principles, critics argue that target-setting and progress-tracking within ACE lacks a trustworthy process and that national government do not always possess the necessary information for effective implementation.

== International frameworks related to ACE ==
=== Sustainable Development Goals (SDGs) ===
At the United Nations Sustainable Development Summit on 25 September 2015, world leaders adopted the 2030 Agenda for Sustainable Development, which includes a set of 17 Sustainable Development Goals (SDGs) and 169 associated targets to end poverty, inequality and injustice, and tackle climate change by 2030. The SDGs build on the Millennium Development Goals (MDGs), eight anti-poverty targets that the world committed to achieving by 2015. The new SDGs, and the broader sustainability agenda, go much further than the MDGs. Three of the 17 goals and two associated targets have particular relevance for ACE:

- Goal 4: Quality Education: Ensure inclusive and equitable quality education and promote lifelong learning opportunities for all, and particularly Target 4.7: "By 2030 ensure all learners acquire knowledge and skills needed to promote sustainable development, including among others through education for sustainable development and sustainable lifestyles, human rights, gender equality, promotion of a culture of peace and non-violence, global citizenship, and appreciation of cultural diversity and of culture's contribution to sustainable development."
- Goal 13: Climate Action: Take urgent action to combat climate change and its impacts, and particularly Target 13.3: "Improve education, awareness-raising and human and institutional capacity on climate change mitigation, adaptation, impact reduction and early warning."
- Goal 16: Promote just, peaceful and inclusive societies, and particularly Target 16.10: "Ensure public access to information and protect fundamental freedoms, in accordance with national legislation and international agreements" and Target 16.7: "Ensure responsive, inclusive, participatory and representative decision-making at all levels."

=== Global Action Programme on Education for Sustainable Development (GAP on ESD) ===
The UN Decade of Education for Sustainable Development took place from 2005 to 2014, with the goal of emphasizing education in all its forms (formal, non-formal and informal) as an indispensable element for achieving sustainable development. In November 2014, as the official follow-up to the DESD, UNESCO launched the Global Action Programme (GAP) for ESD with the overall objective to scale up action on ESD worldwide. Due to its strong linkages with sustainable development, the GAP on ESD provides an excellent framework for understanding the types of education, training and public awareness initiatives conducive to enabling people of all ages to understand and implement solutions for solving the complex problems presented by climate change.

=== Aarhus Convention ===
The Convention on Access to Information, Public Participation in Decision-making and Access to Justice in Environmental Matters (Aarhus Convention) provides the main international framework regulating such matters. The Aarhus Convention grants public rights and imposes obligations on governmental authorities regarding, inter alia, public participation in environmental decision-making. In 2015, the Maastricht Recommendations on Promoting Effective Public Participation in Decision-making in Environmental Matters were published as a practical tool to improve public participation in environmental decision-making, including good practice recommendations.

=== Escazú Agreement ===
The Regional Agreement on Access to Information, Public Participation and Justice in Environmental Matters in Latin America and the Caribbean (Escazú Agreement), adopted on 4 March 2018 under the aegis of the United Nations Economic Commission for Latin America and the Caribbean (ECLAC), offers a powerful tool for climate empowerment and action in Latin American and Caribbean countries. By setting regional standards on access to information, public participation and justice, it can foster broad community and multi-stakeholder engagement in climate change issues. It also provides for specific measures to promote and protect climate defenders. More information is available at: http://www.cepal.org/en/escazuagreement.

=== UNEP Bali Guidelines on Principle 10 ===
In order to catalyze and accelerate action to implement Principle 10 of the Rio Declaration, governments adopted the Guidelines for the Development of National Legislation on Access to Information, Public Participation and Access to Justice in Environmental Matters at the 11th Special Session of the UNEP Governing Council/ Global Ministerial Environmental Forum in Bali, Indonesia. These voluntary guidelines demonstrate a willingness by governments to engage the public more thoroughly at all levels to protect and manage the environment and related resources. In 2016, UNESCO and UNFCCC produced a comprehensive set of guidelines for designing national strategies for ACE.

== See also ==
- Individual and political action on climate change
- List of international environmental agreements
- Montreal Protocol
- Post–Kyoto Protocol negotiations on greenhouse gas emissions
- United Nations Climate Change conference
- United Nations Convention to Combat Desertification
- Keeling Curve

== Sources ==
This article incorporates text from a free content work. Licensed under CC-BY-SA IGO 3.0 (license statement/permission). Text taken from Action for climate empowerment: Guidelines for accelerating solutions through education, training and public, 6, 14-18, 26, 28, UNESCO and UNFCCC, UNESCO. UNESCO.
