= 2013 United Nations Climate Change Conference =

Diplomatic summit concerning greenhouse gas emissions effects; COP19

United Nations Climate Change Conference
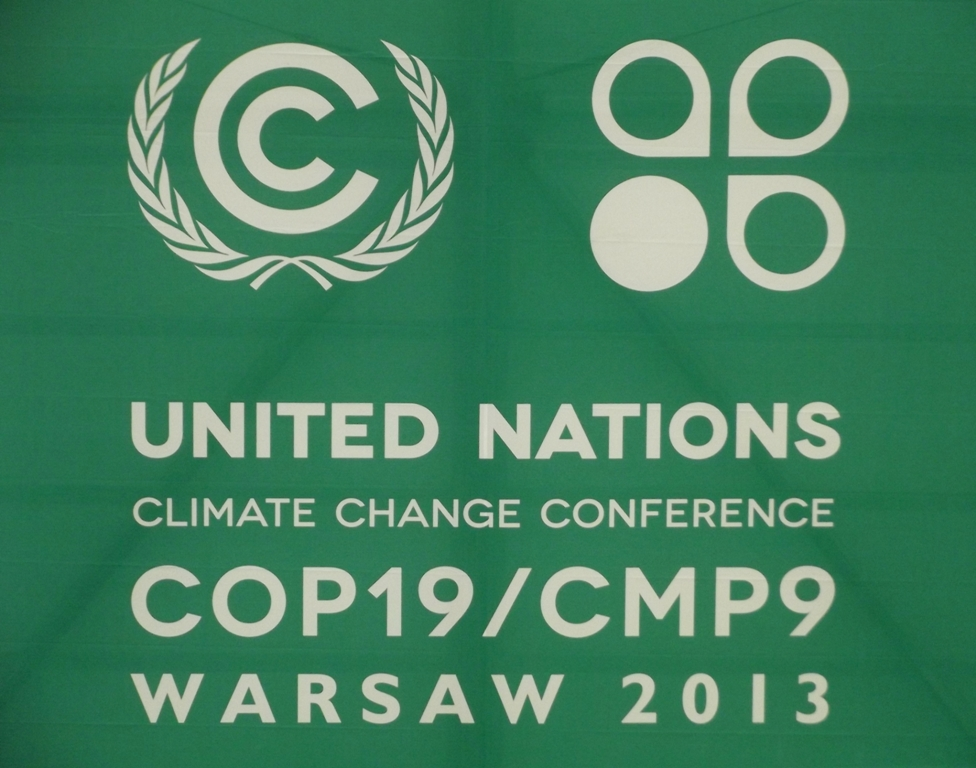
- Genre: Conferences
- Begins: 11 November 2013
- Ends: 23 November 2013
- Venue: Poland National Stadium
- Location: Warsaw
- Country: Poland
- Previous event: ← Doha 2012
- Next event: Lima 2014 →
- Website: www.cop19.gov.pl

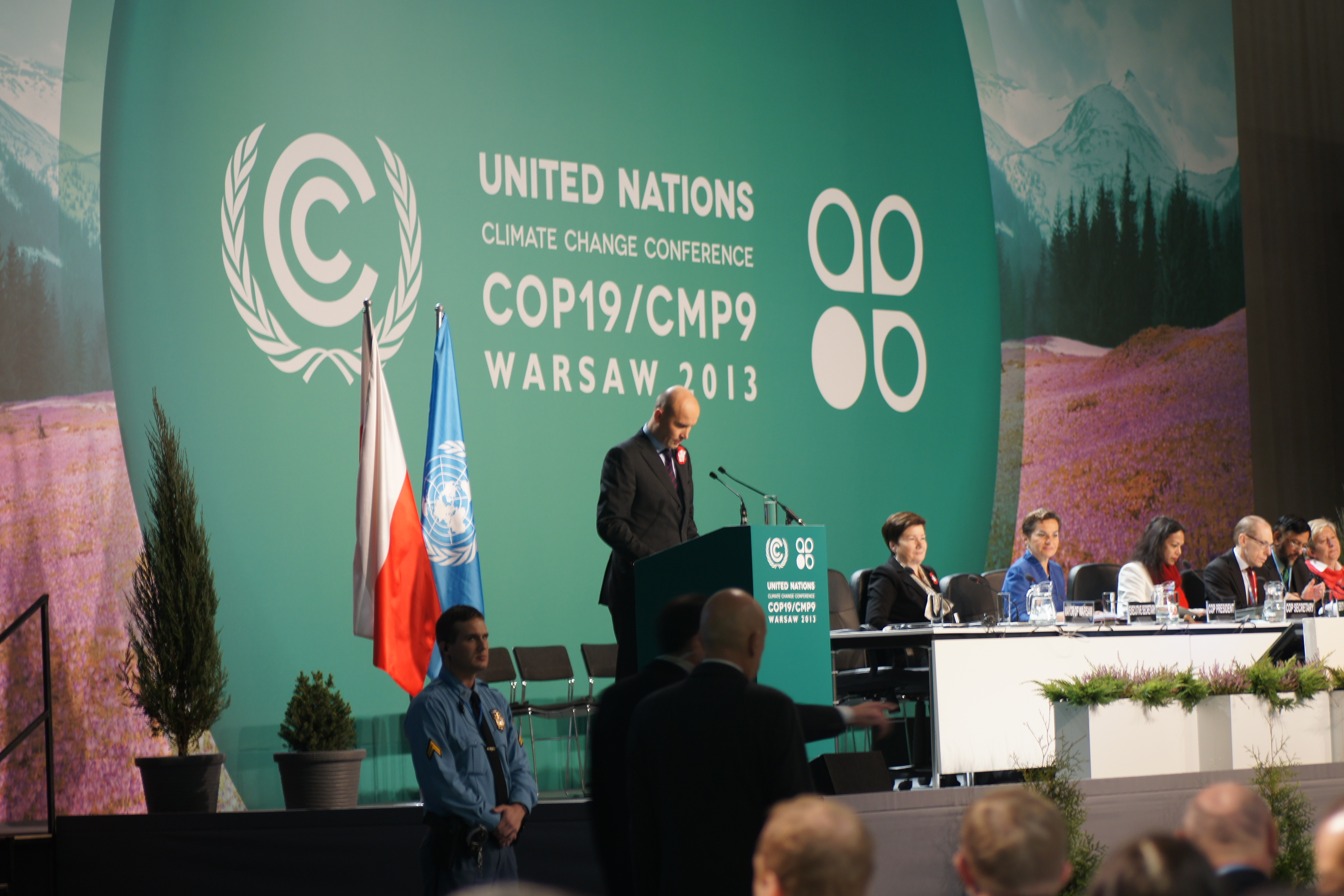
Opening of the COP19 on 11 November 2013

In November 2013, Poland hosted COP19, the United Nations Climate Change Conference in Warsaw. Over 10,000 delegates from 189 countries convened to address the escalating climate crisis, aiming to limit global warming to 2 degrees Celsius and set the stage for the 2015 Paris Agreement.

The conference was overshadowed by controversy: host nation Poland, heavily dependent on coal, faced criticism for its lack of climate ambition, while negotiations exposed stark rifts between developed and developing countries.

Developing countries, led by China, demanded financial support and compensation for climate damages, but wealthy developed countries resisted binding commitments. Some major NGOs left the negotiations in protest due to frustration over the slow progress.

At COP19, countries introduced Intended Nationally Determined Contributions and created the Warsaw International Mechanism, but the meeting also showed how hard it is for the world to agree on climate action.

== Background ==
The United Nations Climate Change Conference, COP19 or CMP9 was held in Warsaw, Poland from 11 to 23 November 2013. This is the 19th yearly session of the Conference of the Parties (COP 19) to the 1992 United Nations Framework Convention on Climate Change (UNFCCC) and the 9th session of the Meeting of the Parties (CMP 9) to the 1997 Kyoto Protocol. The conference delegates continue the negotiations towards a global climate agreement. UNFCCC's Executive Secretary Christiana Figueres and Poland's Minister of the Environment Marcin Korolec led the negotiations.

The conference led to an agreement that all states would start cutting emissions as soon as possible, but preferably by the first quarter of 2015. The term Intended Nationally Determined Contributions was coined in Warsaw upon a proposal from Singapore. The Warsaw International Mechanism was also proposed.

Several preliminary and actual agreements were at the forefront of the talks, including: unused credits from phase one of the Kyoto Protocol, improvements to several UNFCCC action mechanisms, and a refinement of the measurement, reporting, and verification of greenhouse gas emissions (GHGs). Delegates are to focus on the potential conditions of a final global climate change agreement expected to be ratified in 2015 at the Paris Conference.

== Location and participation ==
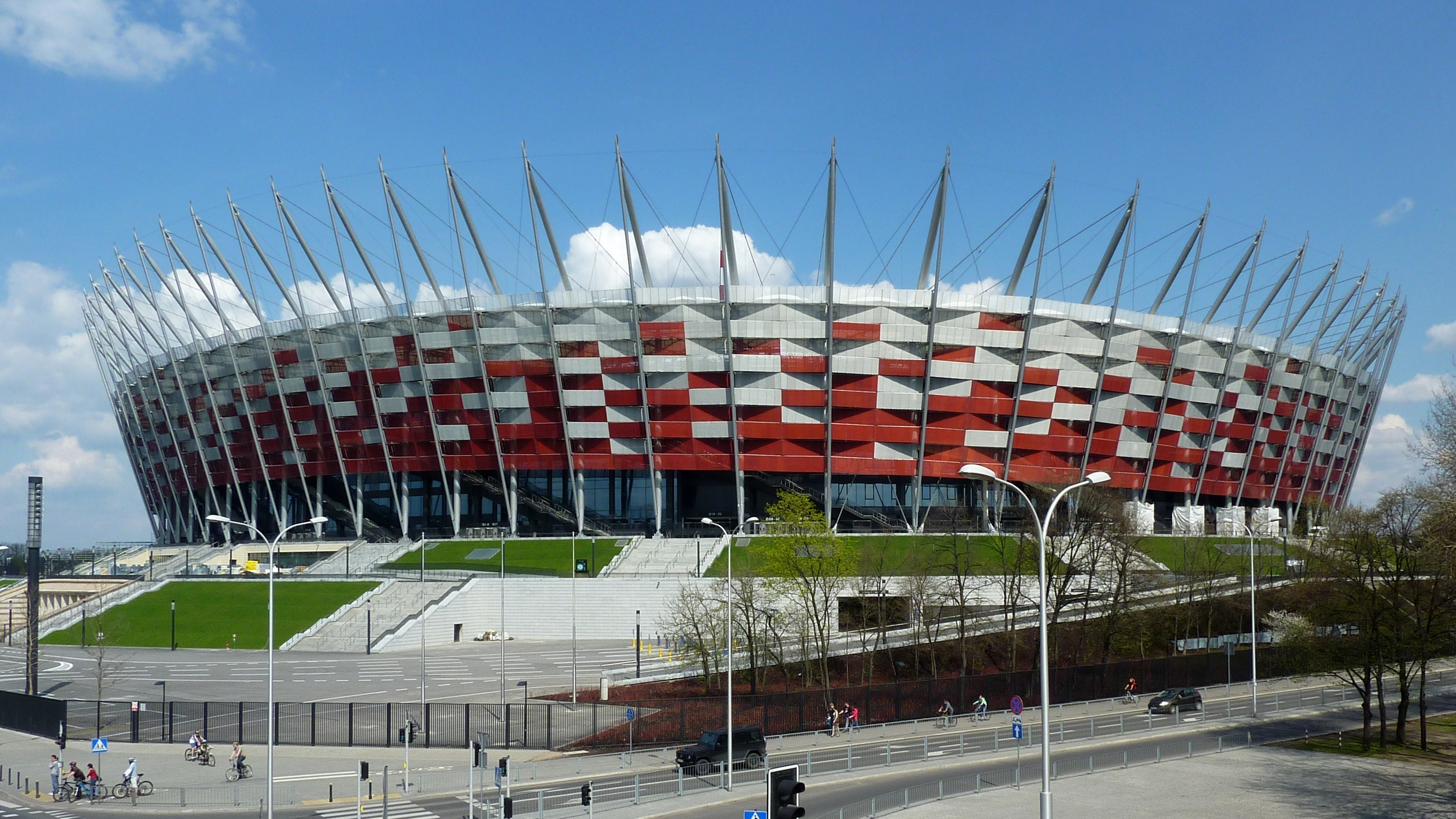
The National Stadium in Warsaw, the main venue of the conference

The location of UNFCCC talks are rotated by regions throughout United Nations countries. In 2013 Warsaw, the capital and largest city in Poland, was chosen to represent the Eastern European Group in the COP 19 Presidency.

The choice of Poland has been criticized by environmental organizations, including Greenpeace, because of the country's lack of commitment to reduce its use of fossil fuels and increase use of renewable energy. As of 2013, 88% of Poland's electricity is sourced from coal, as compared to the global average of 68% electricity from fossil fuels. Its officials have been blocking EU proposals to more effectively act against global warming. Today, Poland's electricity is roughly 71% sourced from coal. In 2011, Poland went against the other EU member states, by blocking the proposed net-zero emissions target for 2050. In addition, its environment minister, and president of the conference, Marcin Korolec, said that he was skeptical about the EU's strategy of leading by example.

Over 10,000 participants from 189 countries registered to attend the conference, but only 134 ministers announced participation. Four countries that are among the most vulnerable to climate change were represented by their president or prime minister: Tuvalu, Nauru, Ethiopia and Tanzania. Polish Prime Minister Donald Tusk dismissed Korolec in preference for a politician who would be better able to deliver a "radical acceleration of shale gas operations" in the country. However, he said that Korolec would remain the government's plenipotentiary for the conference.

== Negotiations ==
The overarching goal of the conference is to reduce greenhouse gas emissions (GHGs) to limit the global temperature increase to 2 degrees Celsius above current levels. According to the Executive Secretary of the UNFCCC, Christiana Figueres,

"Global greenhouse gas emissions need to peak this decade, and get to zero net emissions by the second half of this century... National governments need to act to minimize impacts to their populations and ensure sustainable development over generations. The private sector needs to act to minimize climate risk and capture opportunity. And the international process must push forward now to build the foundation for an ambitious universal climate change agreement in 2015,"

Clean energy, and specifically the financing and technology transfer of renewables in developing countries, will be of utmost importance during the conference. The Indian Minister of Environment stated before the talks that,

"The most important milestone would be climate finance and capitalisation of the Green Climate Fund (GCF), which has not happened at all... Developed countries that made a commitment earlier have now started talking of alternative sources of funding - whereas in our view these are commitments of the parties to the COP."

In addition, the G77 and China group held a press conference to discuss their walkout over the crucial issue of loss and damage related to climate change. They wanted progress and solidarity with other groups like the Least Developed Countries and the Africa Group. Meanwhile, Hedegaard dismissed Brazil's proposal for the Intergovernmental Panel on Climate Change to quantify historical emissions, noting that wealthy nations oppose it due to potential financial implications. She acknowledged that developed countries have a greater responsibility for emissions. Harjeet Singh from ActionAid International criticized wealthy nations, claiming they are ignoring the severe climate impacts on poorer countries and obstructing negotiations that aim to address new forms of loss and damage, such as rising sea levels and biodiversity loss.

Agreements in the Copenhagen round ostensibly formalized $100 billion to the Clean Energy Fund by 2020. This would help assist underprivileged countries in energy development, whereas only $7.5 million had been committed as of June 2013. Australia has support from Britain and others to head off demands for compensation payments to countries hit by damage they blame on climate change, sparking anger at a global summit meant to strike a deal this weekend. Acting on Tony Abbott's edict to avoid any new financial commitments, Australian negotiators have held out against calls to support the "loss and damage" payments sought by underdeveloped nations.

Technology transfer and sharing of intellectual property between industrialized and developing countries will be a major concern in the Warsaw talks. Historically, these discussions have been stalled due to disagreements over the price and sharing mechanisms surrounding intellectual property, and thus new approaches are expected in the Warsaw conference.

A stalemate surrounding the talks has been the insistence of the United States delegates on China and India conforming to binding reduction commitments. However, Chinese and Indian delegates argue that funding from industrialized nations is needed before such emissions cuts can be executed without impacting GDP growth rates. India and Saudi Arabia blocked an agreement which could prevent the release of up to 100 billion metric tons of carbon dioxide equivalent emissions by 2050.

The deaths, injuries and destruction caused by Typhoon Haiyan were brought to attention during the opening day talks. In response to the typhoon and to climate change damage in general, Naderev "Yeb" Saño, the lead negotiator of the Philippines delegation, received a standing ovation for announcing:

In solidarity with my countrymen who are struggling to find food back home, I will now commence a voluntary fasting for the climate, this means I will voluntarily refrain from eating food during this COP, until a meaningful outcome is in sight.

— Naderev Saño, speaking at the 2013 United Nations Climate Change Conference

On land use and forests, COP 19 adopted the Warsaw Framework on REDD-plus, a package of seven decisions (Decisions 9-15/CP.19) that set out methodological guidance and procedures for implementing REDD+ and for recording results and results-based payments through UNFCCC systems.

== Walkouts ==
The G77 and China bloc led 132 underdeveloped countries in a walk out during talks about "loss and damage" compensation for the consequences of global warming. Underdeveloped countries have demanded that the developed world give them $100 billion annually by 2020. Activists and poor countries accused Australian diplomats of not taking the talks seriously, as the country did not send high-ranking officials to the UN summit. They claimed that they would be busy repealing the country's contentious carbon tax. "The carbon tax is bad for the economy and it doesn't do any good for the environment", Prime Minister Tony Abbott told The Washington Post. "Despite a carbon tax of $37 a ton by 2020, Australia's domestic emissions were going up, not down. The carbon tax was basically socialism masquerading as environmentalism, and that's why it's going to get abolished."

Developing countries have called for a new UN institution to handle compensation, but rich nations, including the EU, have resisted, fearing it could lead to an unmanageable system. The EU's climate commissioner, Connie Hedegaard, rejected the proposal for automatic compensation for climate events, saying it was not feasible. Despite this, the G77 and China bloc remained unified on the issue, considering it a "red line." Developing countries argue that wealthier nations, which have historically contributed most to emissions, have a special responsibility to lead on emissions cuts and to address the financial challenges caused by climate change impacts. However, rich nations remain reluctant to agree to full financial commitments, citing concerns about costs and competitiveness. Australia's delegation denied accusations of obstruction and emphasized their goal of achieving a global climate agreement that includes broad participation from all major economies.

On the last day of the conference WWF, Oxfam, ActionAid, the International Trade Union Confederation, Friends of the Earth and Greenpeace walked out of the conference. Greenpeace spokesman Gregor Kessler, however, said that they would not leave the city but would "Follow the discussions from the outside. We will not be part of the internal discussions." Oxfam' Executive Director Winnie Byanyima said: "[Governments] must...come back in 2014 ready for meaningful discussions on how they will deliver their share of the emissions reductions which scientists say are needed and their share of the money needed to help the poorest and most vulnerable countries adapt." All six issued a statement that read: Organizations and movements representing people from every corner of the Earth have decided that the best use of our time is to voluntarily withdraw from the Warsaw climate talks. The Warsaw climate conference, which should have been an important step in the just transition to a sustainable future, is on track to deliver virtually nothing."

== Criticism ==
=== Organizers ===
The organizers of COP19 were strongly criticized for posting comments in an online blog in the lead-up to the conference about the purported advantages of ice melting in the Arctic, stating that "we may build new drilling platforms and retrieve natural resources hidden below the sea bed", as well as "chasing the pirates, terrorists and ecologists that will come to hang around". The bloggers subsequently responded: "Our recent entry on north-west passage was widely discussed but unfortunately misunderstood. The readers considered the forthcoming, bitter, but unfortunately possible scenario as [an] option we like. We do not. But how to react to the featured situation? Should we be silent? We are glad, that the topic caused so much interest and discussion, because the matter is really very serious."

Organizers from the Ministry of the Economy in Poland were also strongly criticized for co-hosting an event with the World Coal Association alongside the UNFCCC talks. This has been seen as a provocation against changing the energy source mix in Poland.

The dismissal of the conference president Marcin Korolec from his cabinet position as Minister of Environment during the negotiations has been seen by delegates as a further sign of Poland's lack of commitment to action to combat global warming. Prime minister Donald Tusk stated that the dismissal had to do with the need for "radical acceleration of shale gas operations".

=== Industrialized countries ===
The International Energy Agency has continually urged industrialized countries to reduce fossil fuel subsidies. It is expected that these subsidy actions will not be addressed.

Several countries attending the COP 19 have been criticized for poor performance on stated environmental pollution targets. While the United States reduced its emissions of CO_{2} in 2012 by 11.8 percent compared to 2005, the largest reduction of any country, others have not done so well.

== Conclusion ==
However, talks continued on the aid that developed countries would pay to help emissions cuts by developing countries. Having previously promised $100 billion a year after 2020 from the $10 billion a year between 2010 and 2012, they resisted calls to set targets for the rest of the decade. The draft resolution of the conference, though, only mentioned setting "increasing levels" of aid. Further the Warsaw Mechanism was proposed, which would provide expertise, and possibly aid, to developing nations to cope with loss and damage from such natural extremities as heatwaves, droughts and floods and threats such as rising sea levels and desertification.

== See also ==
- Post–Kyoto Protocol negotiations on greenhouse gas emissions
- Politics of global warming
- IPCC Fifth Assessment Report
- Global Landscapes Forum: Warsaw 2013
