= Post–Kyoto Protocol negotiations on greenhouse gas emissions =

Towards multi-lateral commitments

Post-Kyoto negotiations refers to high level talks attempting to address global warming by limiting greenhouse gas emissions. Generally part of the United Nations Framework Convention on Climate Change (UNFCCC), these talks concern the period after the first "commitment period" of the Kyoto Protocol, which expired at the end of 2012. Negotiations have been mandated by the adoption of the Bali Road Map and Decision 1/CP.13 ("The Bali Action Plan").

UNFCCC negotiations are conducted within two subsidiary bodies, the Ad Hoc Working Group on Long-term Cooperative Action under the Convention (AWG-LCA) and the Ad Hoc Working Group on Further Commitments for Annex I Parties under the Kyoto Protocol (AWG-KP) and were expected to culminate in the United Nations Climate Change Conference taking place in December 2009 in Copenhagen (COP-15); negotiations are supported by a number of external processes, including the G8 process, a number of regional meetings and the Major Economies Forum on Energy and Climate that was launched by US President Barack Obama in March 2009. High level talks were held at the meeting of the G8+5 Climate Change Dialogue in February 2007 and at a number of subsequent G8 meetings, most recently leading to the adoption of the G8 leaders declaration "Responsible Leadership for a Sustainable Future" during the G8 summit in L´Aquila, Italy, in July 2009.

== February 2007 Washington Declaration ==
In the non-binding "Washington Declaration" on February 16, 2007, the G8+5 group of leaders agreed in principle to a global cap-and-trade system that would apply to both industrialized nations and developing countries, which they hoped would be in place by 2009.

Official G8+5 Climate Change Dialogue Web site

== 33rd G8 summit ==
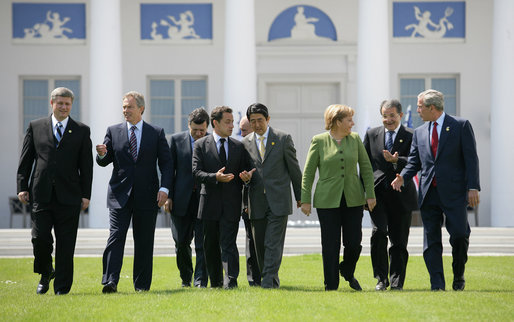
Leaders of the 33rd G8 summit

On June 7, 2007, leaders at the 33rd G8 summit issued a non-binding communiqué announcing that the G8 nations would "aim to at least halve global CO_{2} emissions by 2050". The details enabling this to be achieved would be negotiated by environment ministers within the United Nations Framework Convention on Climate Change in a process that would also include the major emerging economies. Groups of countries would also be able to reach additional agreements on achieving the goal outside and in parallel with the United Nations process. The G8 also announced their desire to use the proceeds from the auction of emission rights and other financial tools to support climate protection projects in developing countries.

The agreement was welcomed by British Prime Minister Tony Blair as "a major, major step forward". French president Nicolas Sarkozy would have preferred a binding figure for emissions reduction to have been set. This was apparently blocked by U.S. President George W. Bush until the other major greenhouse gas emitting countries, like India and China, make similar commitments.

Official G8 Web site

== 2007 UN General Assembly plenary debate ==
As part of the schedule leading up to the September UN High-Level-Event, on July 31 the United Nations General Assembly opened its first-ever plenary session devoted exclusively to climate change, which also included prominent scientists and business leaders. The debate, at which nearly 100 nations spoke, was scheduled to last two days but was extended for a further day to allow a greater number of "worried nations" to describe their climate-related problems.

In his opening speech, Secretary-General Ban Ki-moon urged Member States to work together, stating that the time had come for "decisive action on a global scale", and called for a "comprehensive agreement under the United Nations Framework Convention on Climate Change process that tackles climate change on all fronts, including adaptation, mitigation, clean technologies, deforestation and resource mobilization". In closing the conference General Assembly President Haya Rashed Al-Khalifa called for an "equitable, fair and ambitious global deal to match the scale of the challenges ahead". She had earlier stressed the urgency of the situation, stating that "the longer we wait, the more expensive this will be".

The day after the session ended, the UN launched its new climate change web site detailing its activities relating to global warming.

Official UN web site

== 2007 Vienna Climate Change Talks and Agreement ==
A round of climate change talks under the auspices of the United Nations Framework Convention on Climate Change (UNFCCC) concluded in Austria on 31 August 2007 with agreement on key elements for an effective international response to climate change.

A key feature of the talks was a United Nations report that showed how energy efficiency could yield significant cuts in emissions at low cost.

The talks set the stage for the 2007 United Nations Climate Change Conference held in Bali in December 2007.

== September 2007 United Nations High-Level-Event ==
As well as the meeting of the United Nations General Assembly, Secretary-General Ban Ki-moon was to hold informal high-level discussions on the post-Kyoto treaty on September 24. It was expected that these would pave the way for the United Nations Climate Change Conference, held in Bali in December 2007. Three Special Envoys on Climate Change, appointed on May 1, 2007, held discussions with various governments to define and plan the event.

In advance of the "High-Level-Event", the Secretary-General hoped that world leaders would "send a powerful political signal to the negotiations in Bali that "business as usual" will not do and that they are ready to work jointly with others towards a comprehensive multilateral framework for action".

Official UN Climate Change website

== September 2007 Washington conference ==
It emerged on August 3, 2007, that representatives of the United Nations, major industrialized and developing countries are being invited by George Bush to a conference in Washington on September 27 and 28. Countries invited are believed to include the members of the G8+5 (Canada, France, Germany, Italy, Japan, Russia, United Kingdom, United States, Brazil, China, India, Mexico and South Africa), together with South Korea, Australia, Indonesia and South Africa. The meeting is to be hosted by US Secretary of State Condoleezza Rice, and is envisaged as the first of several extending into 2008. Initial reaction to the news of the conference invitation was mixed.

== 2007 United Nations Climate Change Conference in Bali ==
Negotiations on a successor to the Kyoto Protocol dominated the 2007 United Nations Climate Change Conference. A meeting of environment ministers and experts held in June called on the conference to agree a road-map, timetable and "concrete steps for the negotiations" with a view to reaching an agreement by 2009.

The conference ended with an all-night session of hard bargaining over words and their meaning.

== 2008 United Nations Climate Change Conference in Poznań ==
Following preliminary talks in Bangkok, Bonn, and Accra, the 2008 negotiations culminated in December with the 2008 United Nations Climate Change Conference in Poznań, Poland.

== September 2009 United Nations Secretary General's Summit on Climate Change ==
United Nations Secretary General Ban Ki-Moon convened a high-level event on Climate Change on 22 September 2009 to which Heads of State and Government have been invited. This event was intended to build further political momentum for an ambitious Copenhagen agreed outcome to be adopted at COP-15.

== 2009 United Nations Climate Change Conference in Copenhagen (COP-15) ==
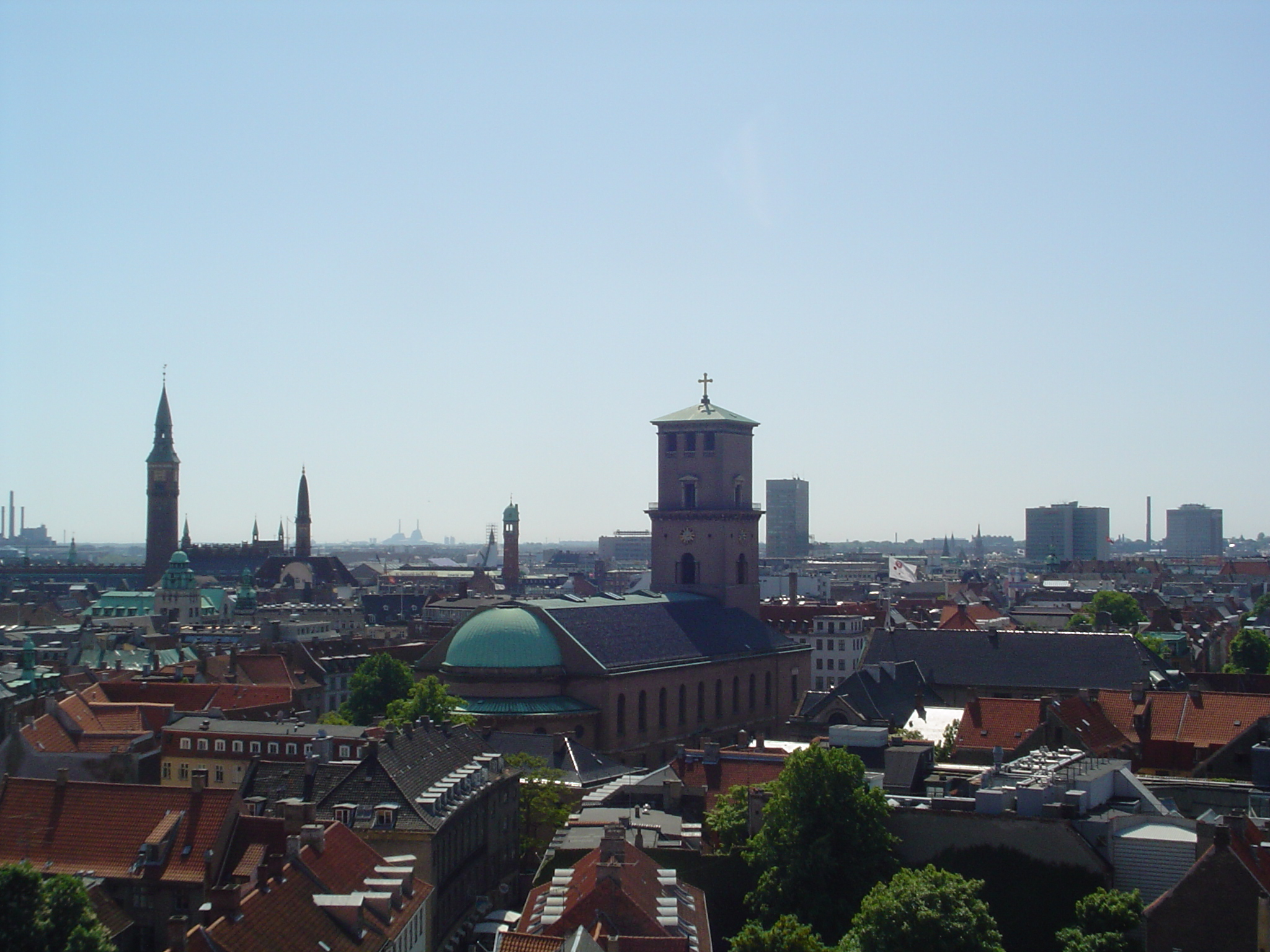
Copenhagen was the center of climate change negotiations in 2009.

Following preparatory talks in Bonn (in Germany), Bangkok and Barcelona, the 2009 conference was held in December 2009 in Copenhagen, Denmark, and the treaty succeeding the Kyoto Protocol had been expected to be adopted there.

Some media sources claimed beforehand that the meeting would lead to empty promises without measurable goals. In a meeting of the Group of Eight G8, the world top leaders agreed to halve carbon emissions by 2050; however, they did not set specific targets because they did not agree on a base year. However members of the climate council acknowledged that action needs to happen fast. "My personal view is that the future of humanity is at stake," said Tim Flannery, Professor at Macquarie University and chairman of the Copenhagen Climate Council, in an interview with chinadialogue.net.

At the Conference, delegates approved a motion to "take note of the Copenhagen Accord of December 18, 2009". The motion was not unanimous, therefore it is not considered to be legally binding. The UN Secretary General Ban Ki-moon welcomed the US-backed climate deal as an "essential beginning", although it subsequently emerged that the US had 'used spying, threats and promises of aid' to gain support for the Accord, under which its emissions pledge is the lowest by any leading nation.

The Copenhagen Accord recognises the scientific case for keeping temperature rises below 2 °C, but does not contain commitments for reduced emissions that would be necessary to achieve that aim, let alone 1.5 °C. One part of the agreement pledges US$ 30 billion to the developing world over the next three years, rising to US$100 billion per year by 2020, to help poor countries adapt to climate change. Earlier proposals, that would have aimed to limit temperature rises to 1.5 °C and cut CO_{2} emissions by 80% by 2050 were dropped. An agreement was also reached that would set up a deal to reduce deforestation in return for cash from developed countries.

== 2011 United Nations Climate Change Conference ==
The 2011 United Nations Climate Change Conference was held in Durban, South Africa, from 28 November to 12 December 2011 to establish a new treaty to limit carbon emissions. The president of the conference was Maite Nkoana-Mashabane.

The conference agreed to a legally binding deal comprising all countries, which will be prepared by 2015, and to take effect in 2020.

== 2012 United Nations Climate Change Conference ==
The 2012 United Nations Climate Change Conference was held in Qatar from 26 November to 7 December 2012. Just before the conference, New Zealand announced it would not be continuing to take part in the Kyoto Protocol. New Zealand's climate minister Tim Groser said the 15-year-old agreement was outdated, and that New Zealand was "ahead of the curve" in looking for a replacement that would include developing nations. The conference reached an agreement to extend the life of the Kyoto Protocol until 2020, and to reify the 2011 Durban Platform, meaning that a successor to the Protocol is set to be developed by 2015 and implemented by 2020.

== 2013 United Nations Climate Change Conference ==
The 2013 United Nations Climate Change Conference was the 19th yearly session of the Conference of the Parties (COP) to the 1992 United Nations Framework Convention on Climate Change (UNFCCC) and the 9th session of the Meeting of the Parties (CMP) to the 1997 Kyoto Protocol (the protocol having been developed under the UNFCCC's charter). The conference was held in Warsaw, Poland from 11 to 22 November 2013.

== Climate Summit 2014 ==
On 23 September 2014, the UN Climate Summit 2014 was held. India, Russia, Canada and Australia (all of whom are on the top 15 of the countries with the most GHG emissions) did not attend the meeting. 125 other countries did attend. France promised to deposit 750 million into the UN climate fund. Perhaps the biggest announcement came from outside the Climate Summit, and was done by the Rockefeller Brothers Fund. They announced to withdraw from investing in the fossil fuel industry, more specifically from coal and tar sands. According to Arabella Advisors, 50 billion USD was withdrawn from this industry. It hence marks the beginning of private investors and large companies withdrawing from polluting industries, at a time when the political motivation for reducing GHG emissions is starting to stall.

== See also ==
- Action for Climate Empowerment
- Action on climate change
- Avoiding dangerous climate change
- Carbon capture and storage
- Convention on Biological Diversity
- List of countries by carbon dioxide emissions
- List of countries by carbon dioxide emissions per capita
- List of countries by greenhouse gas emissions per capita
- Low-carbon and post-carbon economies
- Paris Agreement, the post-Kyoto agreement
- Plug-in hybrid
- Technology transfer
- Tragedy of the commons
- Greenhouse Development Rights
