= WWF =

WWF may refer to:

== Organizations ==
- World Wildlife Fund, a conservation non-profit organization, also called the World Wide Fund for Nature
- World Wrestling Federation, a professional wrestling promotion (now WWE)

=== Fora and unions ===
- World Water Forum, an international forum for water issues
- Working Women's Forum (WWF), a training, trade and credit union in India
- Waterside Workers' Federation of Australia, a defunct Australian trade union

== Computing and games ==
- WWF (file format), a campaign for unprintable PDF documents, endorsed by the World Wide Fund for Nature
- Windows Workflow Foundation (WF), a software component of the .NET Framework
- Words with Friends, a mobile computer game franchise

== Other uses ==
- Welded wire fabric, in concrete slabs
- Wiscasset, Waterville and Farmington Railway, Maine, United States
