= Subsidiary Body for Scientific and Technological Advice =

The Subsidiary Body for Scientific and Technological Advice (SBSTA) is a subsidiary body of the United Nations Framework Convention on Climate Change (UNFCCC) Conference of the Parties (COP). It meets at least twice a year to advise the COP on matters of science, technology and methodology. It is designed to be open to participation by all parties and to be multidisciplinary.

It advises on guidelines for improving standards of national communications and emission inventories. Its roles defined in Article 9 of the UNFCCC are:

(a) Provide assessments of the state of scientific knowledge relating to climate change and its effects;

(b) Prepare scientific assessments on the effects of measures taken in the implementation of the Convention;

(c) Identify innovative, efficient and state-of-the-art technologies and know-how and advise on the ways and means of promoting development and/or transferring such technologies;

(d) Provide advice on scientific programmes, international cooperation in research and development related to climate change, as well as on ways and means of supporting endogenous capacity-building in developing countries; and

(e) Respond to scientific, technological and methodological questions that the COP and its subsidiary bodies may put to the body.

== See also ==
- Subsidiary Body of Implementation
