= Nationally Appropriate Mitigation Action =

Nationally Appropriate Mitigation Action (NAMA) refers to a set of policies and actions that countries undertake as part of a commitment to reduce greenhouse gas emissions. The term recognizes that different countries may take different nationally appropriate action on the basis of equity and in accordance with common but differentiated responsibilities and respective capabilities. It also emphasizes financial assistance from developed countries to developing countries to reduce emissions.

NAMA was first used in the Bali Action Plan as part of the Bali Road Map agreed at the United Nations Climate Change Conference in Bali in December 2007, and also formed part of the Copenhagen Accord issued following the United Nations Climate Change Conference in Copenhagen (COP 15) in December 2009.

== History of the use of NAMA in international agreements ==
=== Bali Action Plan (December 2007) ===
The Bali Action Plan is centered on four main building blocks: (i) Mitigation, (ii) Adaptation, (iii) Technology, and (iv) Financing, with NAMA forming an important part of the mitigation component. The Bali Action Plan called for future discussions to address:

- Measurable, reportable and verifiable nationally appropriate mitigation commitments or actions by all developed countries, and;
- Nationally appropriate mitigation actions by developing country Parties, supported and enabled by technology, financing and capacity-building, in a measurable, reportable and verifiable manner..

=== Copenhagen Climate Conference (December 2009) ===
The Copenhagen Climate Conference did not produce the global agreement envisaged in the Bali Road Map. The Copenhagen Accord, however, did retain the concept of NAMA, but in a narrower definition only applying to Non-Annex 1 countries, and did not specify what form they should take:

Non-Annex I Parties to the Convention will implement mitigation actions … consistent with Article 4.1 and Article 4.7 and in the context of sustainable development … Non-Annex I Parties will communicate information on the implementation of their actions through National Communications, with provisions for international consultations and analysis under clearly defined guidelines that will ensure that national sovereignty is respected. Nationally appropriate mitigation actions seeking international support will be recorded in a registry along with relevant technology, finance and capacity building support. Those actions supported will be added to the list in appendix II. These supported nationally appropriate mitigation actions will be subject to international measurement, reporting and verification in accordance with guidelines adopted by the Conference of the Parties.

== What is meant by Nationally Appropriate Mitigation Action? ==
- Different countries, different nationally appropriate action on the basis of equity and in accordance with common but differentiated responsibilities and respective capabilities
- Developing countries will effectively implement national action depending on the effective implementation of the commitments by developed countries in providing financial resources and transfer of technology.
- The priorities of developing countries are economic and social development and poverty eradication.

India has argued that NAMA means voluntary reductions by developing countries that require to be supported and enabled by technology transfer from developed countries. By definition, NAMAs will vary by country. Indonesia, for example, might focus on integrating climate change policy with other aspects of economic development, such as progressive reduction in oil subsidies, poverty reduction through promotion of alternative income to reduce illegal logging, and exploit more fully the country’s renewable resources, especially geothermal.

== Implementation of NAMA ==
In 2010, no NAMAs were implemented yet. The Program of Activities (PoA) under the Clean Development Mechanism is regarded a precedor of a future NAMA mechanism and already operational.

== Status of NAMA submissions ==
As of September 2012, about 50 countries have submitted information of their NAMA to the UNFCCC. The detailed contents of their submissions vary greatly on each country, ranging from their intention to be associated with the Copenhagen Accord, target sectors, specific actions to be taken, to GHG emissions reduction targets.

=== List of NAMA's submitted ===
- List of NAMA's submitted

=== NAMA's for recognition ===
- Clean Production Agreement, Chile, 2012.

== Criticism of NAMA ==
Some have criticized NAMA as heading away from carbon pricing and encouraging enormous subsidy programs funded by developed countries and implemented on a voluntary basis by developing countries.
