= Bali Road Map =

Conclusion of 2007 Climate change meeting

After the 2007 United Nations Climate Change Conference held on the island of Bali in Indonesia in December 2007, the participating nations adopted the Bali Road Map as a two-year process working towards finalizing a binding agreement at the 2009 United Nations Climate Change Conference in Copenhagen, Denmark. The conference encompassed meetings of several bodies, including the 13th session of the Conference of the Parties (COP 13) to the United Nations Framework Convention on Climate Change and the third session of the Conference of the Parties serving as the meeting of the Parties to the Kyoto Protocol (CMP 3).

The Bali Road Map includes the Bali Action Plan (BAP), which was adopted by Decision 1/CP.13 of COP-13. It also includes the Ad Hoc Working Group on Further Commitments for Annex I Parties under the Kyoto Protocol (AWG-KP) negotiations and their 2009 deadline, the launch of the Adaptation Fund, the scope and content of the Article 9 review of the Kyoto Protocol, as well as decisions on technology transfer and on reducing emissions from deforestation.

== Bali Action Plan ==
=== Cutting emissions ===
The participating nations acknowledged that evidence for global warming was unequivocal, and that humans must reduce emissions to reduce the risks of "severe climate change impacts". The urgency in addressing climate change was accepted. There was a strong consensus for updated changes for both developed and developing countries. Although there were not specific numbers agreed upon in order to cut emissions, the decision recognized that there was a need for "deep cuts in global emissions" (several countries proposed 100% reductions by 2050) and that "developed country emissions must fall 10-40% by 2020".

=== Mitigation ===
Enhanced action on mitigation of climate change includes, inter alia:

- Nationally appropriate mitigation commitments or actions by all developed countries.
- Nationally appropriate mitigation actions (NAMAs) by developing countries.
- Cooperative sectorial approaches and sector-specific actions (CSAs).
- Ways to strengthen the catalytic role of the convention.

==== Forests ====
The nations pledge "policy approaches and positive incentives" on issues relating to reducing emissions from deforestation and forest degradation (REDD) in developing countries; and enhancement of forest carbon stock in developing countries This paragraph is referred to as “REDD-plus”.

=== Adaptation ===
Participants agreed on enhanced co-operation to "support urgent implementation" of measures to protect poorer countries against climate change, including National Adaptation Programmes of Action (NAPAs).

=== Technology ===
In technology development and transfer, the nations will consider how to facilitate the transfer of clean and renewable energy technologies from industrialised nations to the developing countries. This includes, inter alia:

- Removal of obstacles to, and provision of financial and other incentives for, scaling up the development and transfer of technology to developing country Parties in order to promote access to affordable environmentally sound technologies (renewable energies, electric vehicles).
- Ways to accelerate the deployment, diffussion and transfer of such technologies.
- Cooperation on research and development of current, new and innovative technology, including win-win solutions.
- The effectiveness of mechanism and tools for technology cooperation in specific sectors.

=== Finance ===
Provision of financial resources and investment includes:

- Improved access to predictable and sustainable financial resources and the provision of new and additional resources, including official and concessional funding for developing country Parties (dcP).
- Positive incentives for dcP for national mitigation strategies and adaptation action.
- Innovative means of funding for dcP that are particularly vulnerable to the adverse impacts of climate change in meeting the costs of adaptation.
- Incentivisation of adaptation actions on the basis of sustainable development policies.
- Mobilization of funding and investment, including facilitation of climate-friendly investment choices.
- Financial and technical support for capacity-building in the assessment of costs of adaptation in developing countries, to aid in determining their financial needs.

== Ad Hoc Working Groups ==
The Conference decided to establish two subsidiary bodies under the Convention to conduct the process, the Ad Hoc Working Group on Long-term Cooperative Action (AWG-LCA) and the Ad Hoc Working Group on Further Commitments for Annex I Parties under the Kyoto Protocol (AWG-KP), which were to complete their work in 2009 and present the outcome to the COP15/MOP 5.

The AWG-LCA and AWG-KP presented draft conclusions to COP15 and CMP5, which contained many unresolved issues. The working groups were subsequently asked to report to COP16 and CMP6 in Cancun, Mexico.

== Timescales ==
Four major UNFCCC meetings to implement the Bali Road Map were planned for 2008, with the first to be held in either March or April and the second in June, with the third in either August or September followed by a major meeting in Poznań, Poland in December 2008. The negotiation process was scheduled to conclude at the United Nations Climate Change Conference 2009 in Copenhagen.

== See also ==
- Agenda 21
- Alliance of Small Island States (AOSIS)
- Carbon financing
- Climate Technology Initiative (CTI)
- Expert Group on Technology Transfer (EGTT)
- Flexibility mechanism
- Global Environment Facility (GEF)
- Fourth Assessment Report of the Intergovernmental Panel on Climate Change (IPCC)
- LULUCF
- Monitoring, reporting and verification (MRV)
- Private Financing Advisory Network (PFAN)
- Risk assessment
- Technology Needs Assessment (TNA)
- UNDP
- Zero-carbon economy
