= Environmental issues in Africa =

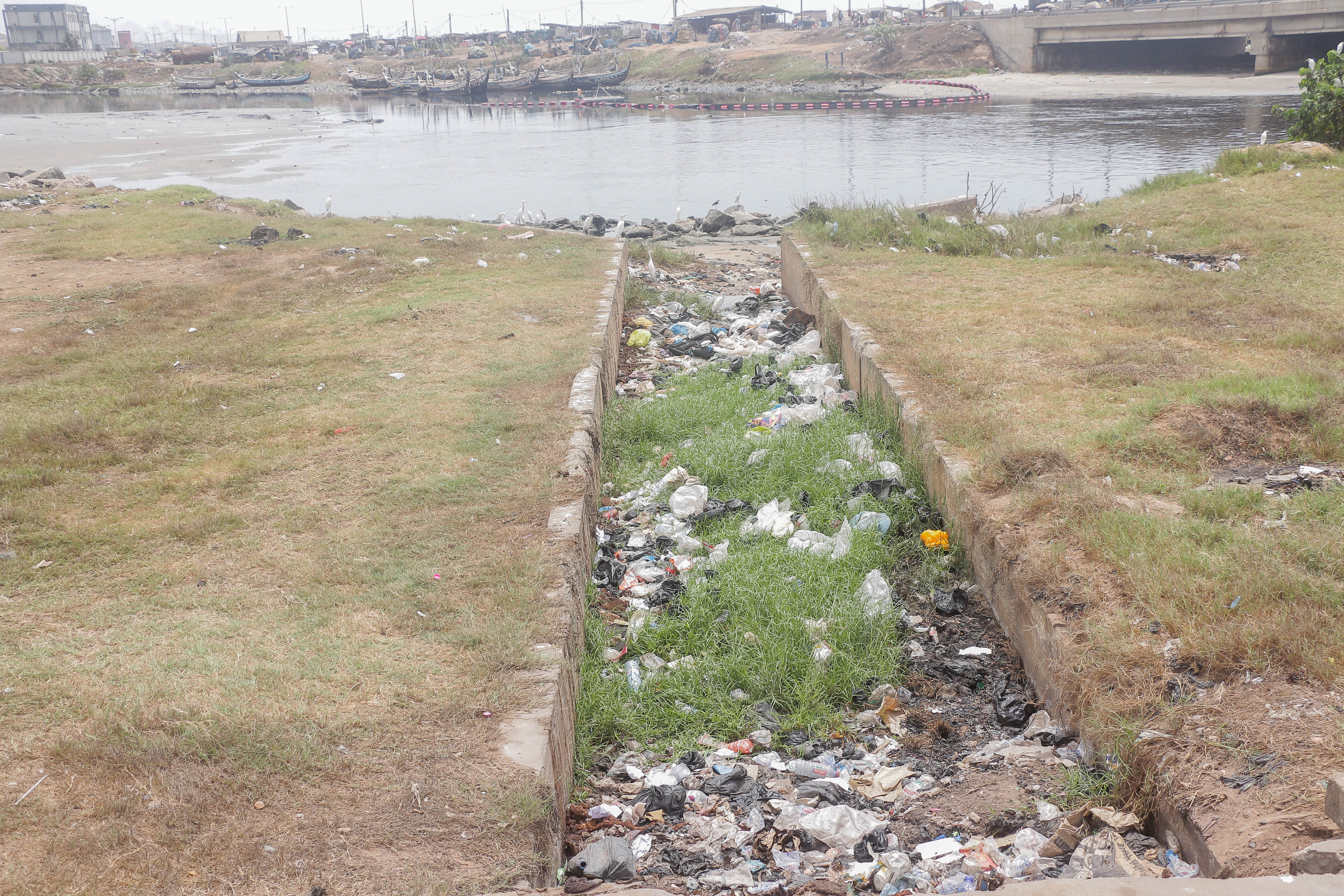
A gutter that connect to the odona drainage is choked with plastic waste in Ghana.

African environmental problems are problems caused by the direct and indirect human impacts on the natural environment and affect humans and nearly all forms of life in Africa. Issues include deforestation, soil degradation, air pollution, water pollution, coastal erosion, garbage pollution, climate change, Oil spills, Biodiversity loss, and water scarcity (resulting in problems with access to safe water supply and sanitation). These issues result in environmental conflict and are connected to broader social struggles for democracy and sovereignty. The scarcity of climate adaptation techniques in Africa makes it the least resilient continent to climate change.

== Deforestation ==
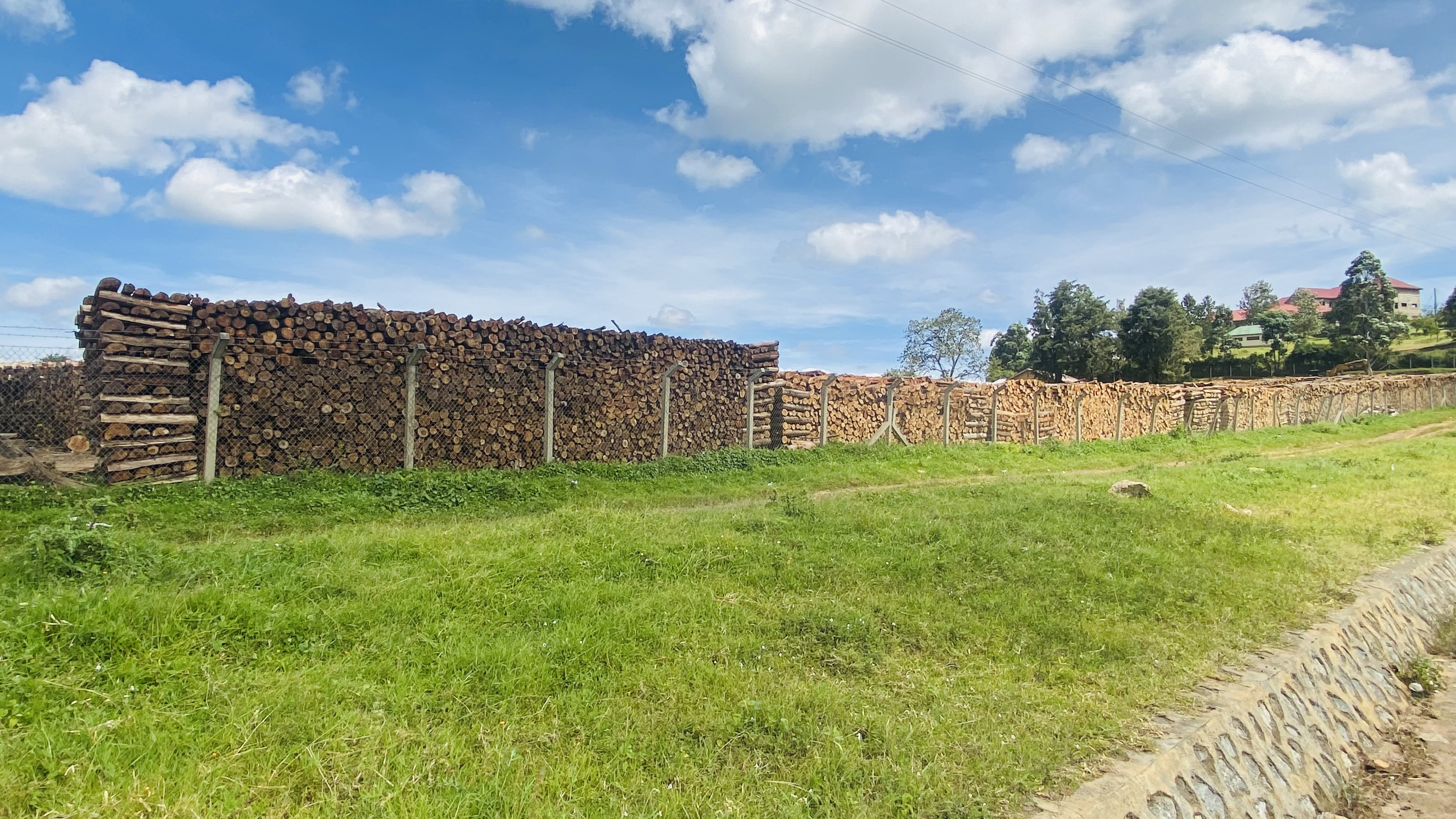
Piles of chopped dry ecalyptus wood in near Butare town in Bushenyi district in Western Uganda.

The large scale felling of trees and the resulting decreases in forest areas are the main environmental issues of the African Continent. Rampant clearing of forests and land conversion goes on for agriculture, settlement and fuel needs. Ninety percent of Africa's population requires wood to use as fuel for heating and cooking. As a result, forested areas are decreasing daily, as for example, in the region of equatorial evergreen forests. According to the United Nations Environment Programme, Africa's desertification rate is twice that of the world's.

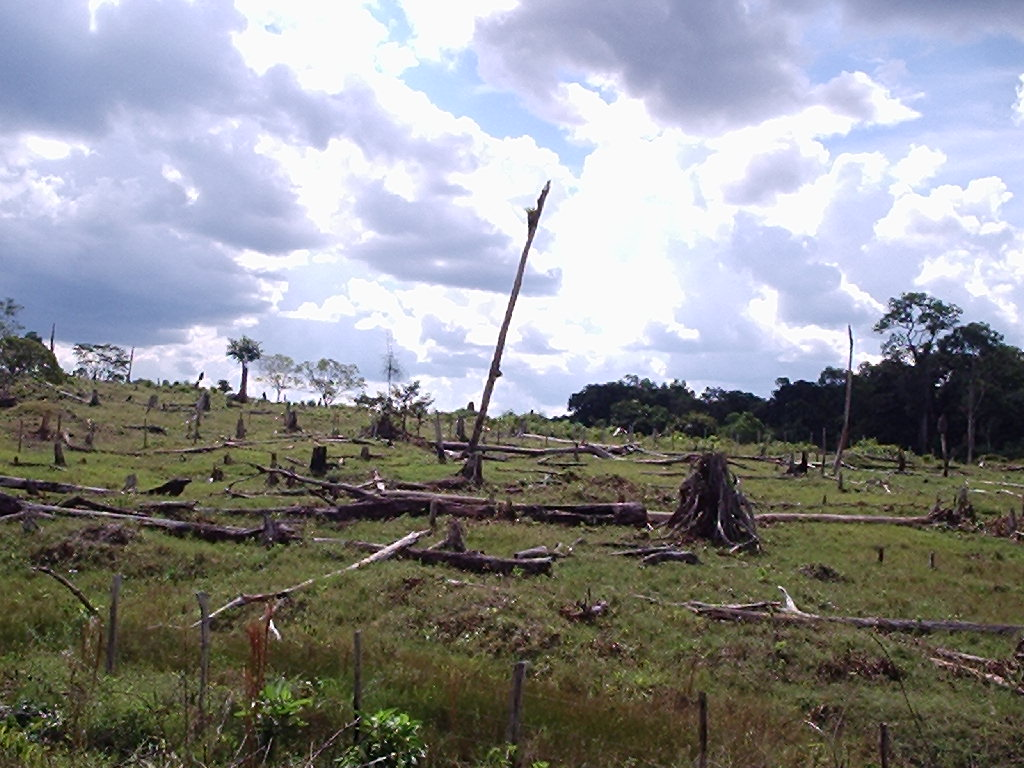
Deforestation of rainforest

The rate of illegal logging, which is another main cause of deforestation, varies from country to country, such as 50% in Cameroon and 80% in Liberia. In the Democratic Republic of the Congo, deforestation is primarily caused by the needs of the poor citizens, along with unsupervised logging and mining.

In Ethiopia, the main cause is the country's growing population, which induces an increase in agriculture, livestock production, and fuel wood. Low education and little government intervention also contributes to deforestation. Madagascar's forest loss is partially caused by citizens using slash-and-burn techniques after independence from the French. In 2005, Nigeria had the highest rate of deforestation in the world, according to the Food and Agriculture Organisation of the United Nations (FAO). Deforestation in Nigeria is caused by logging, subsistence agriculture, and the collection of wood for fuel. According to the gfy, deforestation has wiped out nearly 90% of Africa's forest. West Africa only has 22.8% of its moist forests left, and 81% of Nigeria's old-growth forests disappeared within 15 years. Deforestation also lowers the chance of rainfall; Ethiopia has experienced famine and droughts because of this. 98% of Ethiopia's forests have disappeared over the last 50 years.

Within 43 years, Kenya's forest coverage decreased from about 10% to 1.7%. Deforestation in Madagascar has also led to desertification, soil loss, and water source degradation, resulting in the country's inability to provide necessary resources for its growing population. In the last five years, Nigeria lost nearly half of its primary forests.

Ethiopia's government, along with organizations like Farm Africa, is starting to take steps to stop excessive deforestation.

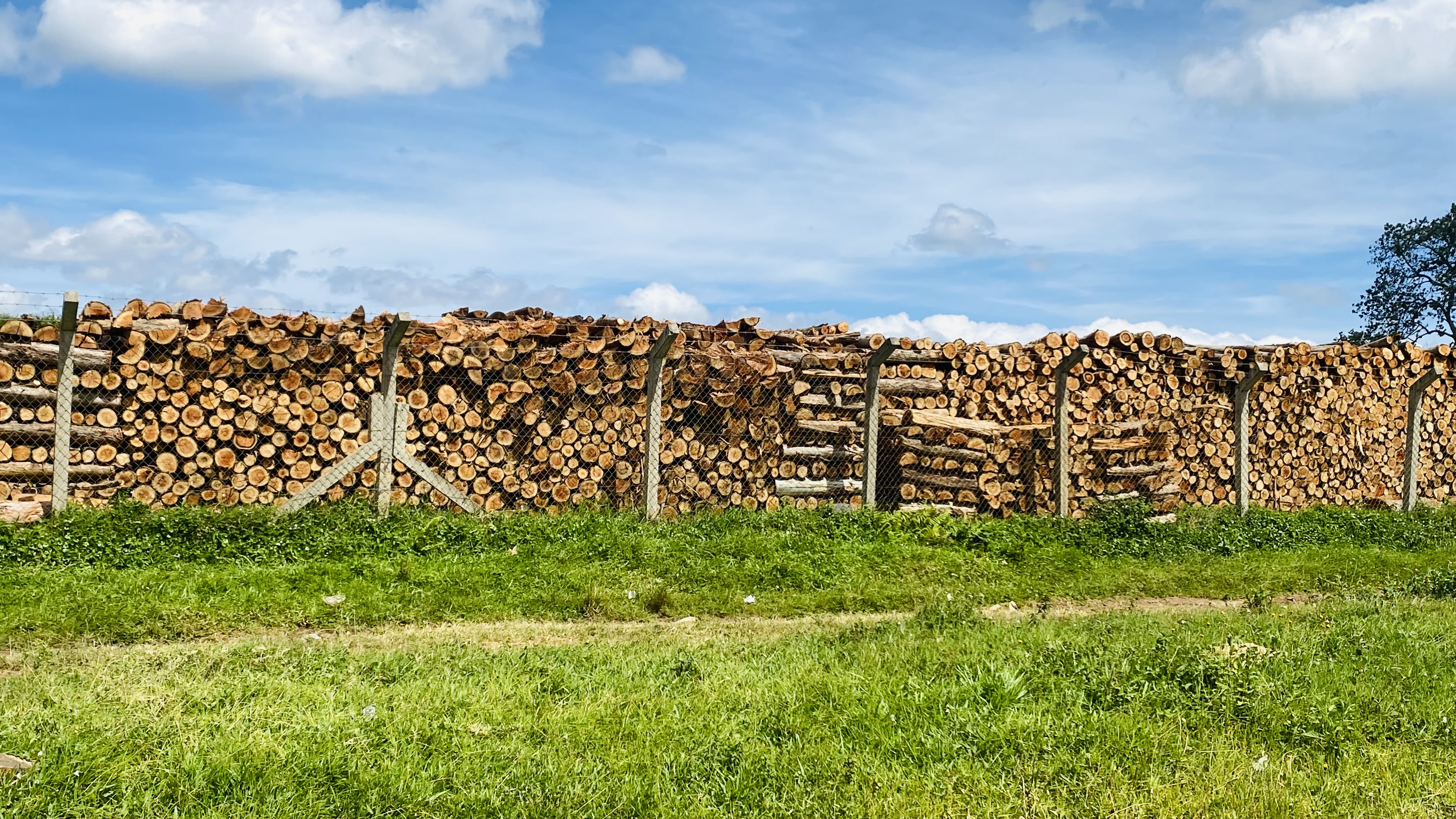
Piles of chopped dry ecalyptus wood next to Igara Secondary school near Butare town in Bushenyi district in Western Uganda 05

Deforestation is an issue, and forests are important in Africa, as populations have relied heavily on them to provide basic needs. Woods are used for shelter, clothing, agricultural elements, and much more. Woodland supplies are also used to create medicines and a wide variety of food. Some of these foods include fruits, nuts, honey, and much more. Wood is crucial for economic gain in Africa, especially in developing countries. Forests also help the environment. It is estimated that the green belt of Africa contains over 1.5 million species. Without the forest habitat to protect the species, the populations are at risk. The livelihoods of millions of people and species are at risk with deforestation. The act is a domino effect that affects multiple aspects of a community, ecosystem, and economy.

Many African nations have begun to implement restoration projects to reverse the effects of deforestation. These projects have been shown to improve the environment in many ways and the livelihood of the people living near them. For example "Reforestation and agroforestry schemes can help, for instance, to sequester carbon, prevent flooding, enhance biodiversity, rehabilitate degraded lands, provide a local energy supply for the rural poor and improve land use and watershed management."

== Soil degradation ==
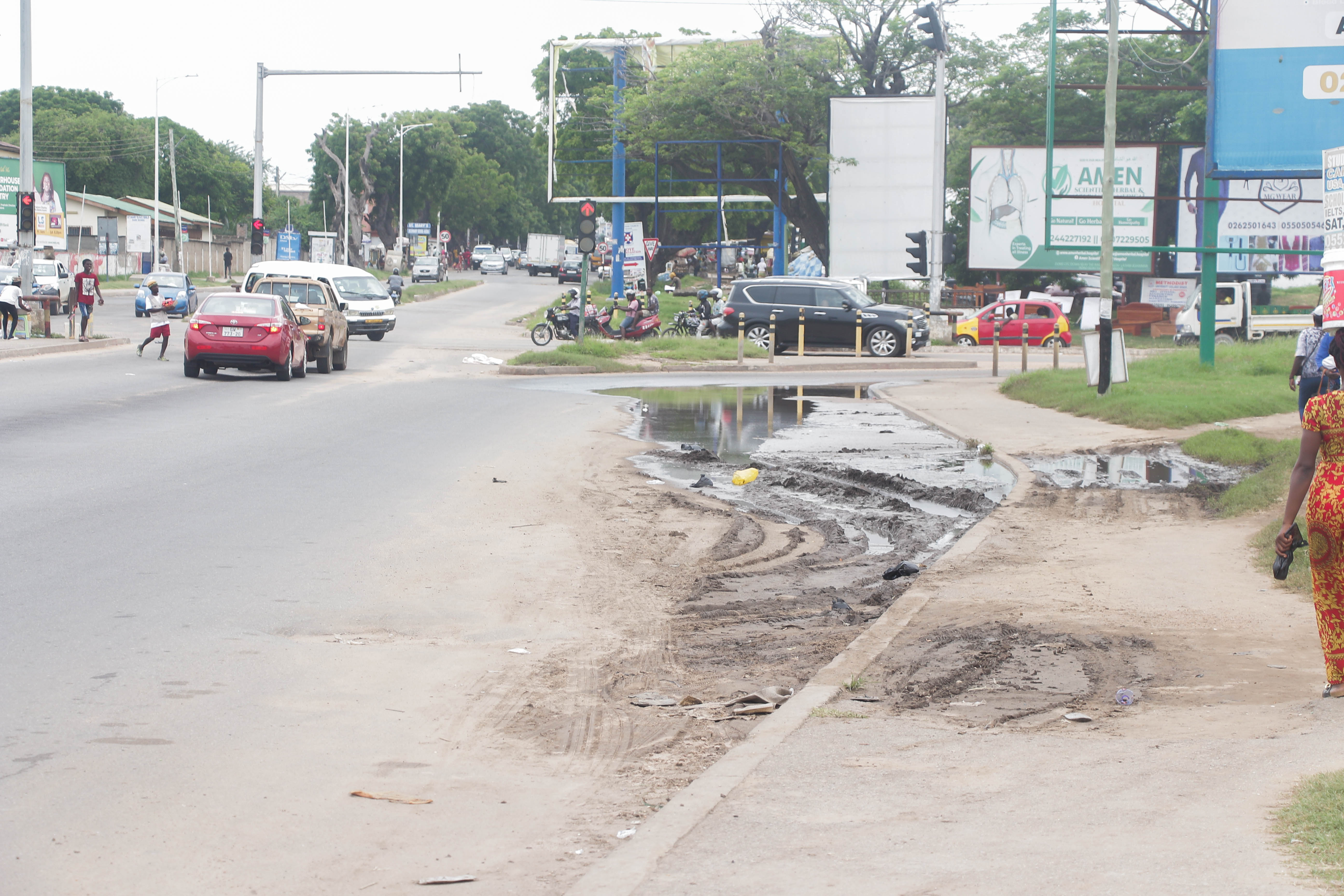
Sand and water on the side of the road, causing erosion on the environment

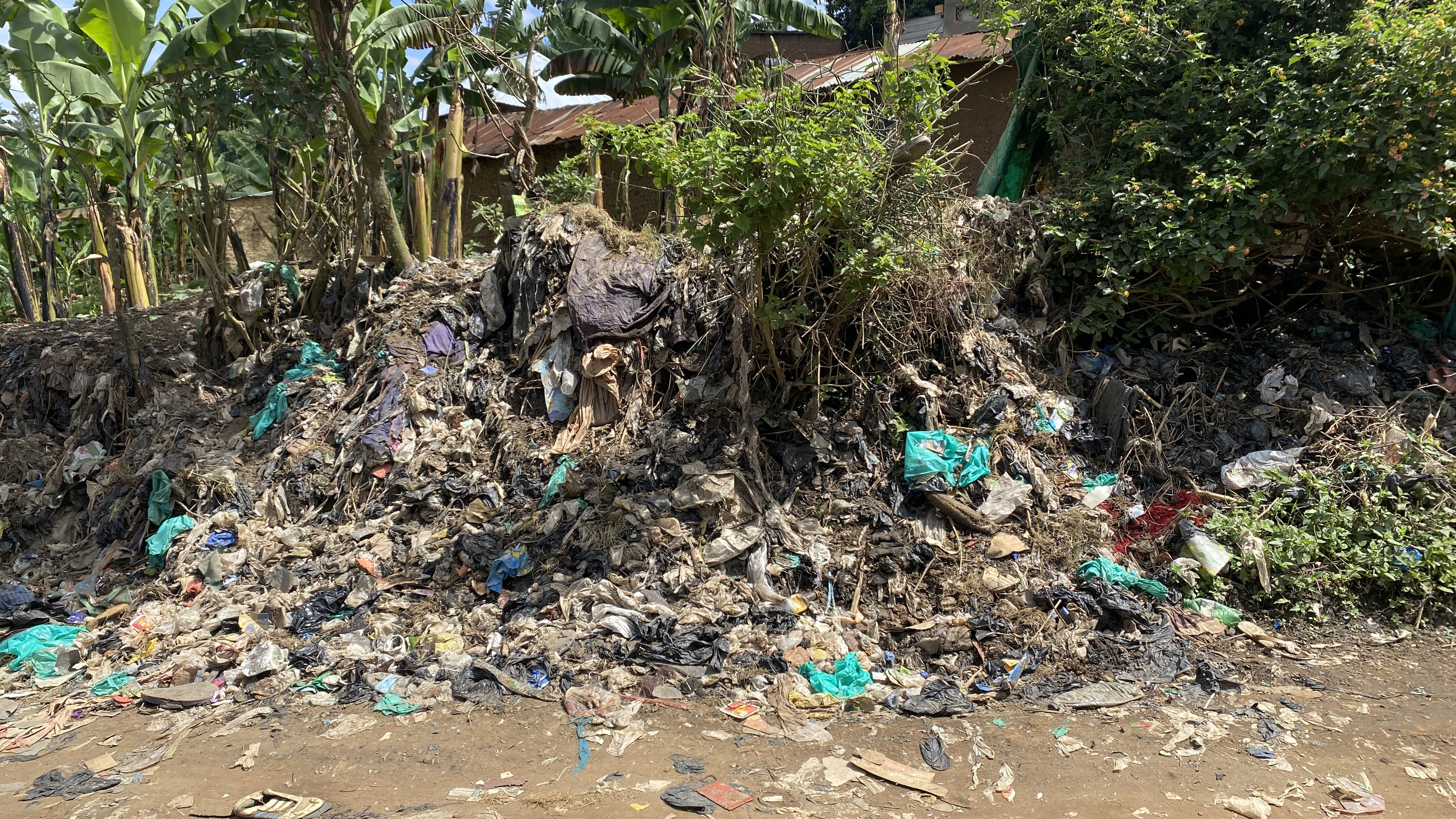
Plastic bags dumped by the road side in Katete in mbarara district in western Uganda.

The erosion caused by rains, rivers and winds as well as over-use of soils for agriculture and low use of manures have resulted in turning the soils infertile, as for example, in the plains of the Nile and the Orange River. A main cause of soil degradation is lack of manufactured fertilizers being used, since African soil lacks organic sources of nutrients and also dumping of plastic waste such as polythene bags, broken plates, basins, water drums, plastic water bottles and jerrycans on the soils. The increase in population also has led people to rely on cropping as a source of income, but many do not take measures to protect the soil, due to low income. The current methods create too much pressure on other environmental aspects, such as forests, and are not sustainable. There are also ecological causes of the poor soil quality. Much of the soil has rocks or clay from volcanic activity. Other causes include erosion, desertification, and deforestation. Another source of soil degradation is the improper management of waste, lack of facilities and techniques to handle waste lead to the dumping of waste in soil, therefore causes soil degradation by process such as leaching.

Degradation of African soil causes decreased food production, damaging ecological effects, and an overall decrease in the quality of living in Africa. This issue would lessen if fertilizers and other cropping supplies were more affordable and thus used more. The United Nations has commissioned a Global Assessment of Human Induced Soil Degradation (GLASOD) to further investigate the causes and state of the soil. Access to information collected is freely available, and it is hoped that awareness will be raised among politicians in threatened areas.

== Air pollution ==
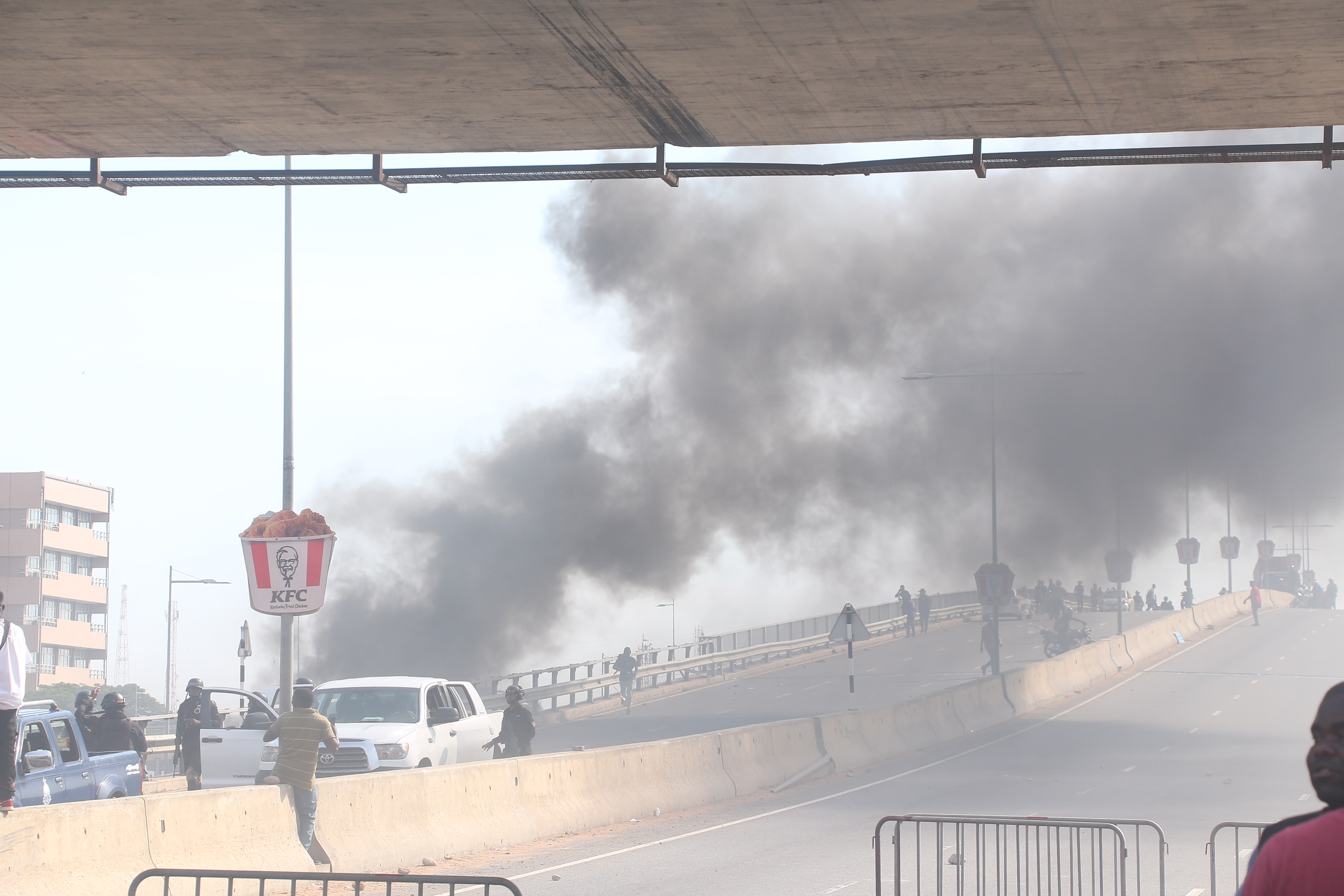
Burning of car tires causing air pollution in Accra.

Air pollution in Africa is a major issue. The continent experiences some of the worst air pollution and related health consequences in the world, contributing to 1.1 million deaths in Africa in 2019. There is regional variation, with West Africa having the highest levels of air pollution on average.

Reasons for air pollution include farming, cooking with solid fuels, fossil fuels, open burning of waste, and dust from the Sahara and other natural sources. The United Nations' Food and Agriculture Organization (FAO) estimates that 11.3 million hectares of land are being lost annually to agriculture, grazing, uncontrolled burning and fuelwood consumption. Combustion of wood and charcoal are used for cooking and this results to a release of carbon dioxide into the atmosphere, which is a toxic pollutant in the atmosphere. Also, due to the poor supply of power, most homes have to rely on fuel and diesel in generators to keep their electricity running. More than 350 million African children live in households that use solid fuels, mostly wood and coal, for cooking and heating. The emissions from these solid fuels are the main causes of indoor air pollution.

It is expected that Africa could represent the half of the world's pollution emissions by 2030, warns Cathy Liousse director of research of atmospheric sounding of the CNRS, along with many other researchers. According to the report, sub-Saharan Africa is experiencing a fast increasing pollution, derived from many causes, such as burning wood for cooking, open burning of waste, traffic, agri-food and chemical industries, the dust from the Sahara carried by the winds through the Sahel area, all this reinforced by a greater population growth and urbanisation.

The World Health Organization reports of the need to intervene when more than one third of the total Disability Adjusted Life Years was lost as a result of exposure to indoor air pollution in Africa. Fuel is needed to power lights at night. The fuel being burned causes great emissions of carbon dioxide into the atmosphere. Because of the increased Urbanization in Africa, people are burning more and more fuel and using more vehicles for transportation. The rise in vehicle emissions and the trend towards greater industrialization means the urban air quality in the continent is worsening. This is also the case in many megacities in Nigeria where the key contributors to poor air quality include vehicle emissions, industrial emissions and solid waste burning. Seasonal variations in pollution also exist with the highest levels of air pollution occurring during the dry season (November to March in the north, May to September in the south).

In many countries, the use of leaded gasoline is still widespread, and vehicle emission controls are nonexistent. Indoor air pollution is widespread, mostly from the burning of coal in the kitchen for cooking. Compounds released from fuel stations and nitrogen and hydrocarbon released from airports cause air pollution. Carbon dioxide other greenhouse gases in the air causes an increase of people with respiratory issues.

There is a common relationship between air pollution and population. Africa is widely diverse, with areas that are overpopulated versus areas that are scarcely populated. In regions where there is little industrial development and few people, air quality is high. Vice versa, in densely populated and industrialized regions the air quality is low. Addressing the air pollution in big cities is often a big priority, even though the continent as a whole produces little air pollutants by international standards. Even so, air pollutants are causing a variety of health and environmental problems. These pollutants are a threat to the population of Africa and the environment they try so hard to sustain.

Heavy metal pollution is also an issue. For example, in South Africa the mercury levels are severe due to coal combustion and gold mining. Mercury is absorbed from the air into the soil and water. The soil allows the crops to absorb the mercury, which humans ingest. Animals eat the grass which has absorbed the mercury and again humans may ingest these animals. Fish absorb the mercury from the water, humans also ingest the fish and drink the water that have absorbed the mercury. This increases the mercury levels in humans. This can cause serious health risks.

== Climate change ==
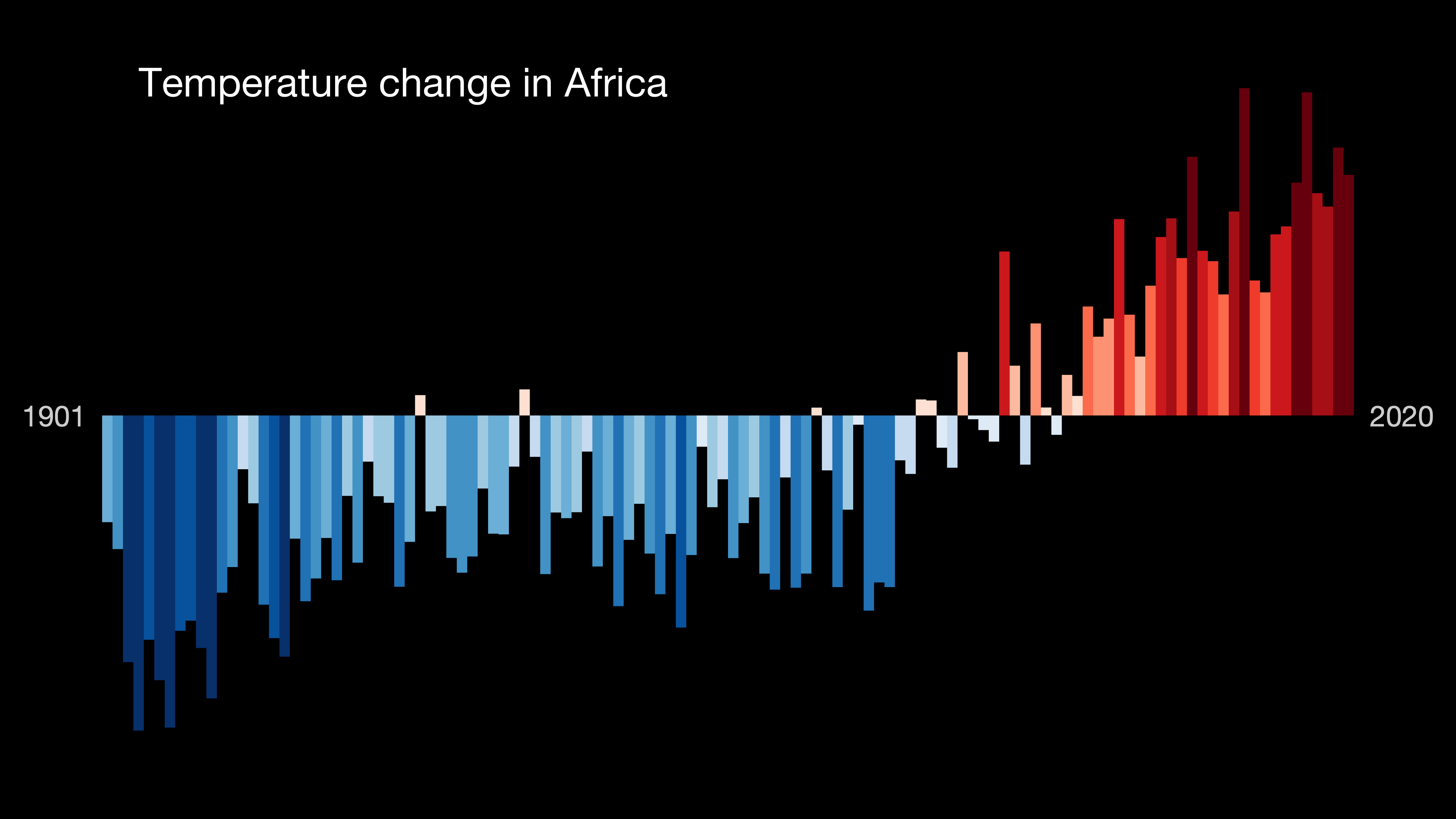
Graph showing temperature change in Africa between 1901 and 2021, with red colour being warmer and blue being colder than average (The average temperature during 1971–2000 is taken as the reference point for these changes.)

Climate change in Africa is a serious threat because the continent is one of the most vulnerable regions to the effects of climate change, despite being responsible for less than 4% of global greenhouse gas emissions. Climate change is causing increasingly erratic rainfall patterns, more frequent extreme weather events such as droughts and floods, and rising sea-surface temperatures across the continent. These changes threaten food and water security, biodiversity, public health, and economic development. Africa is currently warming faster than the rest of the world on average.

Climate change intensifies existing socioeconomic vulnerabilities. Large segments of the African population depend on climate-sensitive livelihoods such as agriculture (55 - 62% of the workforce in sub-Saharan Africa) and already live in poverty, heightening their exposure to shocks. Health outcomes worsen as heat stress, vector-borne diseases (such as malaria and dengue), and malnutrition become more prevalent. Over half (56%) of the over 2,000 recorded public health incidents in Africa between 2001 and 2021 were connected to climate change. Resource scarcity contributes to displacement and conflict, particularly in fragile regions. Urban areas, often characterized by informal settlements, face heightened risks from flooding and extreme heat.

Agriculture is one of the most vulnerable sectors, as most African farmers rely on rainfed crops. Reduced and unpredictable rainfall, combined with higher temperatures, drives soil moisture loss, desertification (especially in the Sahara) and shifts suitable growing areas. These changes lower yields of staple crops, undermining food security and worsening hunger. Livestock health is increasingly compromised by heat stress and shifting disease patterns. Coastal and marine ecosystems face warming seas and rising levels, which threaten fisheries and densely populated coastal settlements.

The economic toll of climate change is severe. On average African countries face climate-related losses amounting to 2-5% of GDP annually, while adaptation costs in sub-Sahran Africa are projected at USD 30-50 billion per year over the next decade. This threatens development gains and places pressure on governments and international institutions to mobilise climate finance.

Africa's climate change adaptation strategies focus on building resilience through climate-smart agriculture, sustainable water management, ecosystem conservation, and strengthening health and infrastructure systems. These approaches prioritise enhancing governance, mobilising climate finance and investment, and fostering community participation to address vulnerability holistically. Continental and national frameworks emphasise multi-sectoral coordination, technology adoption, and capacity building to support sustainable development and reduce climate risks.

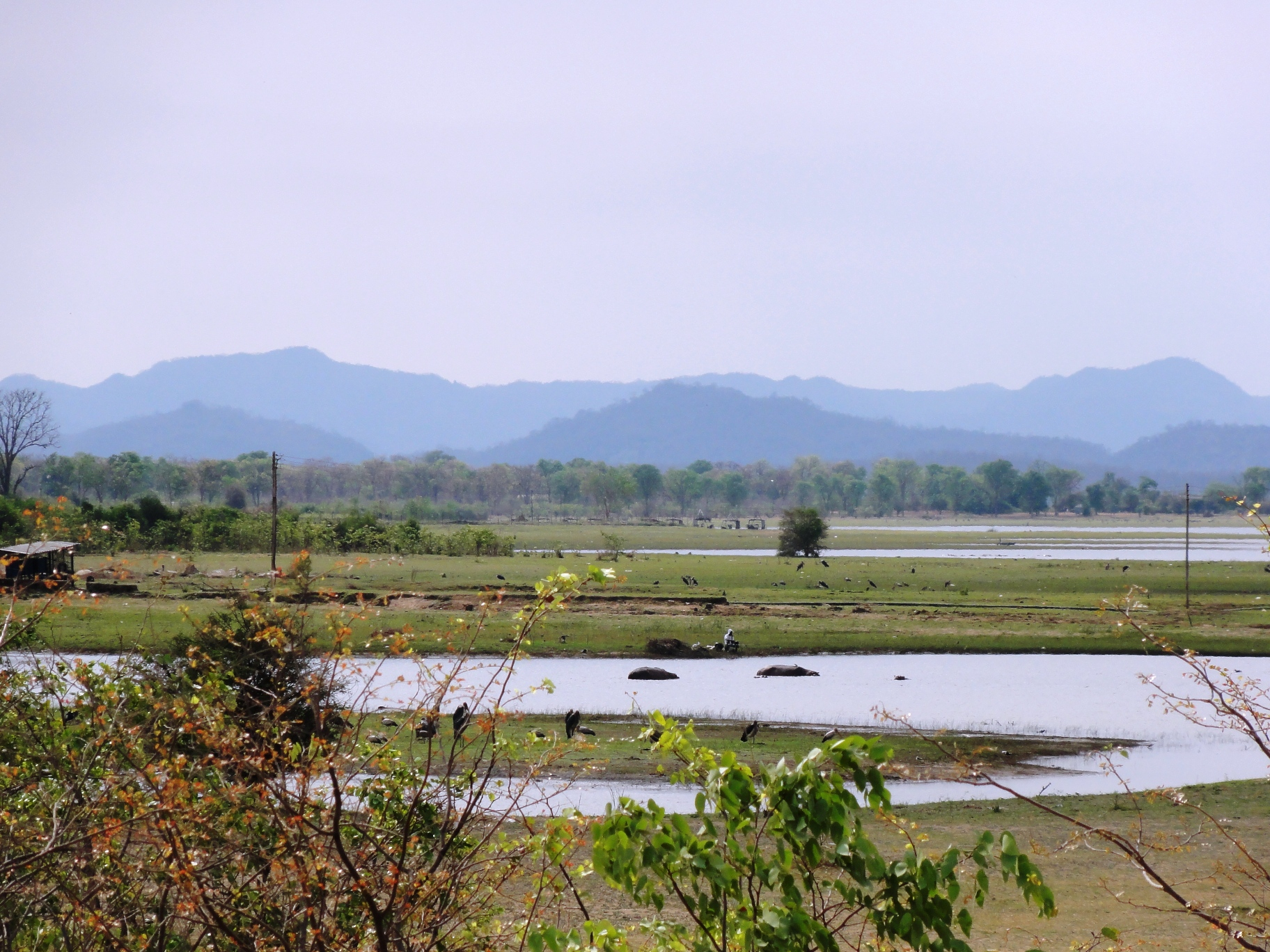
Lake kariba

== Coastal erosion ==
Coastal erosion is a notable environmental issue in many regions of Africa, particularly along the West African coast. This process results in the loss of land, damage to infrastructure, and displacement of communities. To address these problems, the West Africa Coastal Areas Management Program (WACA) was initiated in 2018, with funding of $594 million from the World Bank through the International Development Association (IDA). Benin and Togo experience an annual coastline loss of approximately 15 meters, with some areas losing up to 30 meters. This erosion has led to the destruction of homes and posed significant risks to lives and investments. WACA has supported about twenty major cross-border infrastructure projects, covering over 42 kilometers with breakwaters, groins, and sand walls. In areas such as Grand-Popo, the sea has receded by 200 meters, creating a new 5.3-kilometer-long beach. The program has safeguarded the lives and livelihoods of 27,000 households (about 145,000 individuals) from flooding, and has improved recreational spaces and artisanal fishing.

== Water scarcity ==
The main causes of water scarcity in Africa are physical and economic water scarcity, rapid population growth, and the effects of climate change on the water cycle. Water scarcity is the lack of fresh water resources to meet the standard water demand. The rainfall in sub-Saharan Africa is highly seasonal and unevenly distributed, leading to frequent floods and droughts.

The Food and Agriculture Organization of the United Nations reported in 2012 that growing water scarcity is now one of the leading challenges for sustainable development. This is because an increasing number of river basins have reached conditions of water scarcity. The reasons for this are the combined demands of agriculture and other sectors. Water scarcity in Africa has several impacts. They range from health, particularly affecting women and children, to education, agricultural productivity and sustainable development. It can also lead to more water conflicts.

== Plastic pollution ==
Share of plastic waste that is inadequately managed

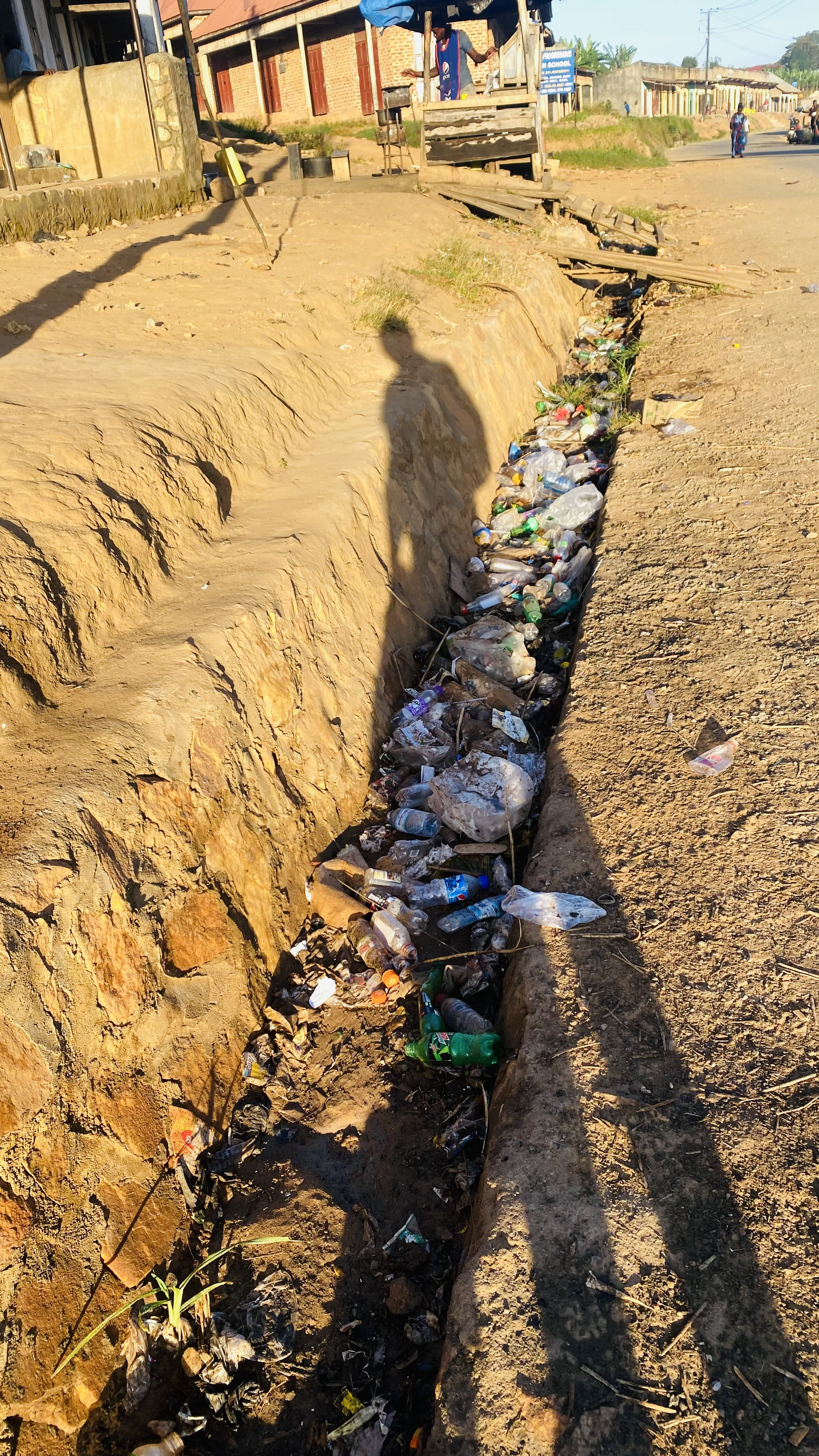
Garbage and plastic waste in drainage channel in Butare town in Bushenyi District in Western Uganda.

Like in other parts of the developing world, plastic pollution is causing widespread problems such as contamination of waterways, disruption of stormwater management, and increases of disease due to mosquitos and pests living in plastics. Plastic mismanagement is both a combination of cheap supply by all kinds of manufacturers, for example by providing much needed access to water through bottled water and water sachets, and poor management of the waste after use.

Some locations in Africa have also been the sourcing of dumping plastic waste from the Global North. Some governments are responding, and the continent leads the rest of the world in plastic bans which reduced allowed use and manufacture of single use plastics such as plastic bags and food serving tools.

== Oil spills ==
Oil spills have been a recurrent problem in Nigeria's Niger Delta region, as Nigeria's National Oil Spill Detection and Response Agency (NOSDRA) recorded 822 combined oil spills, totalling 28,003 barrels of oil spewed into the environment.

The Niger Delta region has solely experienced more than 12,000 oil spill occurrences, half of them were the consequences of tanker accidents and pipeline degradation. The spill incidents caused poisoning in the waterways, lands, and upended farmers' livelihood from agriculture as well as affected citizens' lives. A study showed that child and neonatal mortality increased in the wake of the oil-spills crisis. Additionally, oil corporations have been charged with violating Nigerian law by not cleaning up spills within 24 hours. The two largest companies in the Niger Delta, Shell and Eni, were accused by Amnesty International of being careless in their handling of regional oil disasters. The campaign group said that the businesses' "irresponsible response" to oil spills was the reason why the environmental calamity in the Niger Delta had gotten worse. But both businesses have now denied this assertion.

== Biodiversity loss ==
Africa's biodiversity is considered a crucial pillar representing it as the continent hosts the largest biodiversity percentage of 22% including the megafauna, avian species, and special plant species. Madagascar and the Indian Ocean islands rank among the most vulnerable regions of Africa, according to the Intergovernmental Science-Policy Platform on Biodiversity and Ecosystem Services (IPBES). IPBES estimates that one million species are in danger of going extinct and that many more will do so in the ensuing decades. It is estimated that by the end of the century, misuse and ecological degradation will result in the extinction of 20–30% of lake species, as well as 50–60% of African bird and mammal species, fisheries, and wildlife. Factors that contribute in biodiversity loss include climate change and greenhouse gas emissions that exacerbate the hotspots across Africa; as the continent comprises eight hotspots out of 36 on earth including: Succulent Karoo, Horn of Africa, Madagascar, Guinean Forests Of West Africa, Coastal forests of eastern Africa, Afromontane, Cape Floristic Region, and Maputaland-Pondoland-Albany Hotspot.

Other man-augmented factors include population growth, urbanization, illegal trafficking and poaching. A regional strategy was developed by the East Africa Community members and Ministry of Tourism, Wildlife and Antiquities of Uganda to combat poaching and illegal trafficking of wildlife, which was built on six pillars:

- Strengthening policy and legislation framework
- Developing and enhance law enforcement capacity
- Strengthening regional and international collaboration
- Increasing capacity of local communities to pursue sustainable livelihood
- Promoting research and development
- Promoting education and public awareness about wildlife crime

== See also ==
- African Environment (bulletin)
- Africover (UN project)
- AFR100
- Environmental issues in the Niger Delta
- Movement for the Survival of the Ogoni People
- Desertification in Africa
