= United Nations Convention to Combat Desertification =

International treaty on environmental protection

United Nations Convention to Combat Desertification in Those Countries Experiencing Serious Drought and/or Desertification, Particularly in Africa
- Type: Multilateral environmental agreement
- Context: Environmentalism, Desertification
- Drafted: 17 June 1994
- Signed: 14 October 1994 – 13 October 1995
- Location: Bonn, Germany; New York City, United States
- Effective: 26 December 1996
- Condition: Ratification by 50 States
- Parties: 197: All 193 UN Member States; Cook Islands; European Union; Niue; Palestine
- Depositary: Secretary-General of the United Nations
- Languages: Arabic; Chinese; English; French; Russian; Spanish

Full text
- United Nations Convention to Combat Desertification at Wikisource

The United Nations Convention to Combat Desertification in Those Countries Experiencing Serious Drought and/or Desertification, Particularly in Africa (UNCCD) is a Convention to combat desertification and mitigate the effects of drought through national action programs that incorporate long-term strategies supported by international cooperation and partnership arrangements.

The Convention, the only convention stemming from a direct recommendation of the Rio Conference's Agenda 21, was adopted in Paris, France, on 17 June 1994 and entered into force in December 1996. It is the only internationally legally binding framework set up to address the problem of desertification. The Convention is based on the principles of participation, partnership and decentralization—the backbone of good governance and sustainable development. It has 197 parties, making it near universal in reach.

To help publicise the Convention, 2006 was declared "International Year of Deserts and Desertification" but debates have ensued regarding how effective the International Year was in practice.

== States Parties ==
Parties to the Convention in green

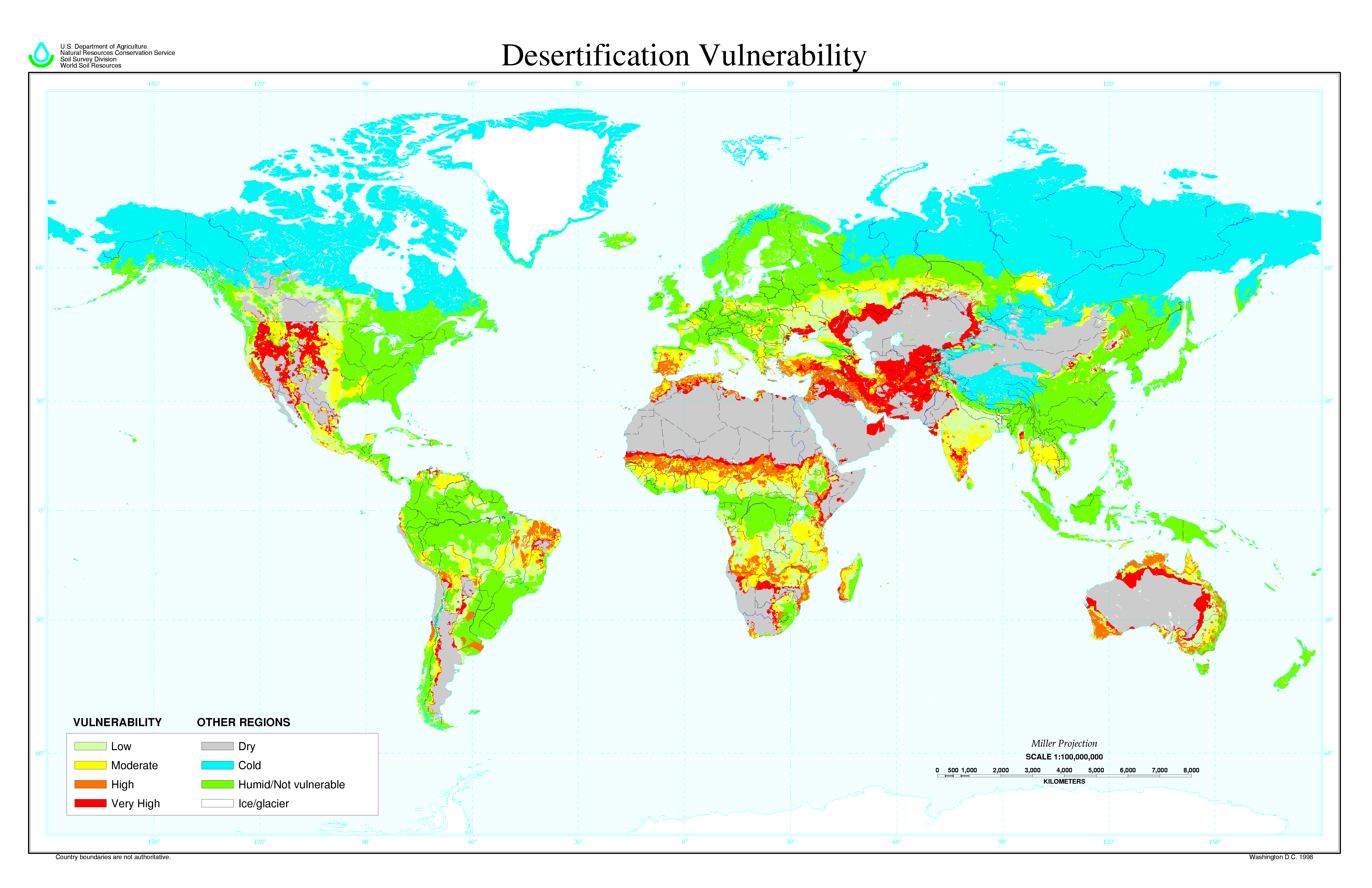
Global desertification vulnerability

The UNCCD has been ratified by the European Union and 196 states, including all 193 UN member states, the Cook Islands, Niue, and the State of Palestine.

On 28 March 2013, Canada became the first country to withdraw from the convention. However, three years later, Canada reversed its withdrawal by re-acceding to the convention on 21 December 2016, which resulted in Canada becoming party to the convention again on 21 March 2017.

The Holy See (Vatican City) is the only state that is not a party to the convention that is eligible to accede to it.

== Executive Directors ==
- 1993–2007: Hama Arba Diallo
- 2007–2013: Luc Gnacadja
- 2013–2019: Monique Barbut
- 2019–2025: Ibrahim Thiaw
- 2025–present: Yasmine Fouad

== Secretariat ==
The permanent Secretariat of the UNCCD was established during the first Conference of the parties (COP 1) held in Rome in 1997. It has been located in Bonn, Germany, since January 1999, and moved from its first Bonn address in Haus Carstanjen to the new UN Campus in July 2006.

The functions of the secretariat are to make arrangements for sessions of the Conference of the Parties (COP) and its subsidiary bodies established under the Convention, and to provide them with services as required. One key task of the secretariat is to compile and transmit reports submitted to it.

The secretariat also provides assistance to affected developing country parties, particularly those in Africa. This is important when compiling information and reports required under the Convention. UNCCD activities are coordinated with the secretariats of other relevant international bodies and conventions, like those of the UN Framework Convention on Climate Change (UNFCCC) and the Convention on Biological Diversity (CBD).

== 2018–2030 Strategic Framework ==
At its thirteenth session in 2017, the Conference of the Parties adopted the UNCCD 2018–2030 Strategic Framework and encouraged parties to apply it in national policies, programmes, plans and processes related to desertification, land degradation and drought. The framework includes a vision, strategic objectives and an implementation framework. Its objectives include improving affected ecosystems, combating desertification and land degradation, supporting land degradation neutrality, improving the living conditions of affected populations, strengthening drought resilience, generating global environmental benefits and mobilizing resources for implementation.

== Conference of the Parties ==
The Conference of the Parties (COP) oversees the implementation of the Convention. It is established by the Convention as the supreme decision-making body, and it comprises all ratifying governments. The first five sessions of the COP were held annually from 1997 to 2001.

Starting 2001 sessions are held on a biennial basis interchanging with the sessions of the Committee for the Review of the Implementation of the Convention (CRIC), whose first session was held in 2002.

COP16 was held in Riyadh, Saudi Arabia, from 2 to 13 December 2024, under the theme "Our Land. Our Future". According to the UNCCD, parties at COP16 focused on land restoration, drought resilience and international cooperation, while more than US$12 billion was pledged to address desertification, land degradation and drought, especially in vulnerable countries. The conference also requested the creation of a Caucus for Indigenous Peoples and a Caucus for Local Communities, continued the Convention's Science-Policy Interface and left further work on a global drought regime for COP17 in Mongolia in 2026. The Earth Negotiations Bulletin reported that parties did not reach agreement on whether future drought negotiations should result in a framework or a legally binding protocol.

=== List of COP ===
COP	Date	City	Remark
COP 1	29 September to 10 October 1997	Rome (Italy)	
COP 2	30 November to 11 December 1998	Dakar (Senegal)	
COP 3	15 to 26 November 1999	Recife (Brazil)	
COP 4	11 to 22 December 2000	Bonn (Germany)	
COP 5	1 to 12 October 2001	Geneva (Switzerland)	
COP 6	25 August to 5 September 2003	Havana (Cuba)	
COP 7	17 to 28 October 2005	Nairobi (Kenya)	
COP 8	3 to 14 September 2007	Madrid (Spain)	
COP 9	21 September to 2 October 2009	Buenos Aires (Argentine)	
COP 10	10 to 20 October 2011	Changwon (South Korea)	
COP 11	16 to 27 September 2013	Windhoek (Namibia)	
COP 12	12 to 23 October 2015	Ankara (Turkey)	
COP 13	6 to 16 September 2017	Ordos City (China)	
COP 14	2 to 13 September 2019	New Delhi (India)	Adoption of The New Delhi Declaration: Investing in Land and Unlocking Opportunities
COP 15	9 to 20 May 2022	Abidjan (Côte d’Ivoire)	
COP 16	2 to 13 December 2024	Riyadh (Saudi Arabia)	
COP 17	17 to 28 August 2026	Ulaanbaatar (Mongolia)	The theme for COP17 is Restoring Land. Restoring Hope.

== Committee on Science and Technology ==
The UN Convention to Combat Desertification has established a Committee on Science and Technology (CST). The CST was established under Article 24 of the Convention as a subsidiary body of the COP, and its mandate and terms of reference were defined and adopted during the first session of the Conference of the Parties in 1997. It is composed of government representatives competent in the fields of expertise relevant to combating desertification and mitigating the effects of drought. The committee identifies priorities for research, and recommends ways of strengthening cooperation among researchers. It is multi-disciplinary and open to the participation of all Parties. It meets in conjunction with the ordinary sessions of the COP.

The CST collects, analyses and reviews relevant data. It also promotes cooperation in the field of combating desertification and mitigating the effects of drought through appropriate sub-regional, regional and national institutions, and in particular by its activities in research and development, which contribute to increased knowledge of the processes leading to desertification and drought as well as their impact.

The Bureau of the CST is composed of the Chairperson and the four Vice-Chairpersons. The chairman is elected by the Conference of the Parties at each of its sessions with due regard to ensure geographical distribution and adequate representation of affected Country Parties, particularly those in Africa, who shall not serve for more than two consecutive terms. The Bureau of the CST is responsible for the follow-up of the work of the Committee between sessions of the COP and may benefit from the assistance of ad hoc panels established by the COP.

The CST also contributes to distinguishing causal factors, both natural and human, with a view to combating desertification and achieving improved productivity as well as the sustainable use and management of resources.

Under the authority of the CST, a Group of Experts was established by the COP with a specific work programme, to assist in improving the efficiency and effectiveness of the CST. This Group of Experts, working under the authority of the CST, provides advice on the areas of drought and desertification.

== Group of Experts ==
The Group of Experts (GoE) plays an important institutional role, providing the CST with information on the current knowledge, the extent and the impact, the possible scenarios and the policy implications on various themes assigned in its work programme. The results of the work performed by the GoE are widely recognized and include dissemination of its results on ongoing activities (benchmarks and indicators, traditional knowledge, early warning systems).

The Group of Experts develops and makes available to all interested people information on appropriate mechanisms for scientific and technological cooperation and articulates research projects, which promote awareness about desertification and drought between countries and stakeholders at the international, regional and national level.

The Group of Experts seeks to build on and use existing work and evidence to produce pertinent synthesis and outputs for the use of the Parties to the Convention and for the broader dissemination to the scientific community. The programme of work and its mandate is pluri-annual in nature, for a maximum of four years.

== National, regional and sub-regional programmes ==
National Action Programmes (NAP) are one of the key instruments in the implementation of the Convention. They are strengthened by Action Programmes on Sub-regional (SRAP) and Regional (RAP) level. National Action Programmes are developed in the framework of a participative approach involving the local communities and they spell out the practical steps and measures to be taken to combat desertification in specific ecosystems.

== See also ==
- Action for Climate Empowerment
- Earth Summit
- Economics of Land Degradation Initiative
- Hama Arba Diallo
- International Year of Deserts and Desertification
- List of international environmental agreements
- Terrafrica partnership
- United Nations Framework Convention on Climate Change (UNFCCC)
- World Day to Combat Desertification and Drought
