= Ibrahim Thiaw =

Mauritanian public servant

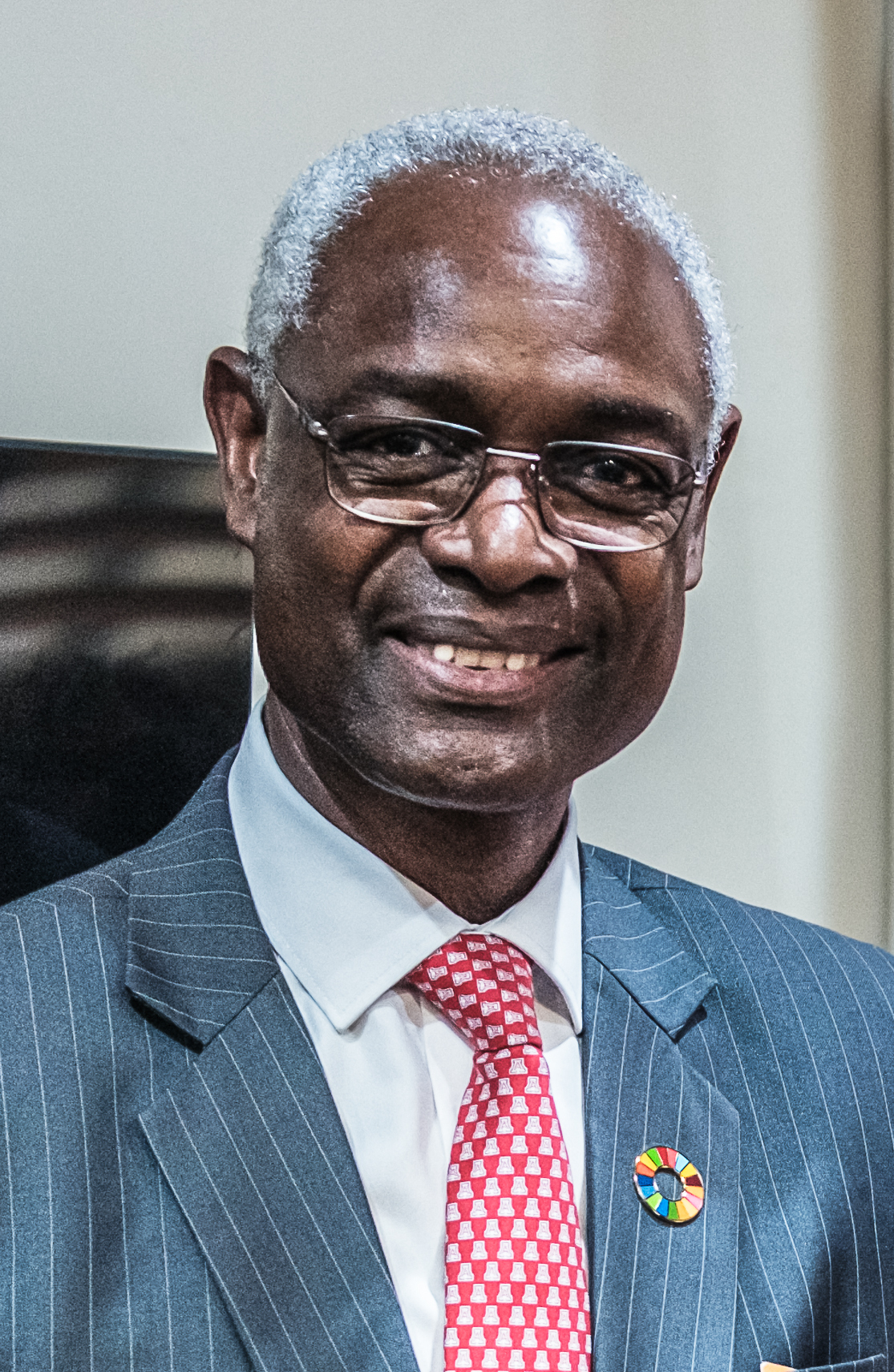
Thiaw in 2025

Ibrahim Thiaw is a Mauritanian public servant who served as executive secretary of the United Nations Convention to Combat Desertification (UNCCD) from 2019 to 2025.

== Early life and education ==
Born in 1957 in Tékane, Mauritania, Thiaw holds an advanced degree in forestry and forest product techniques.

== Career ==
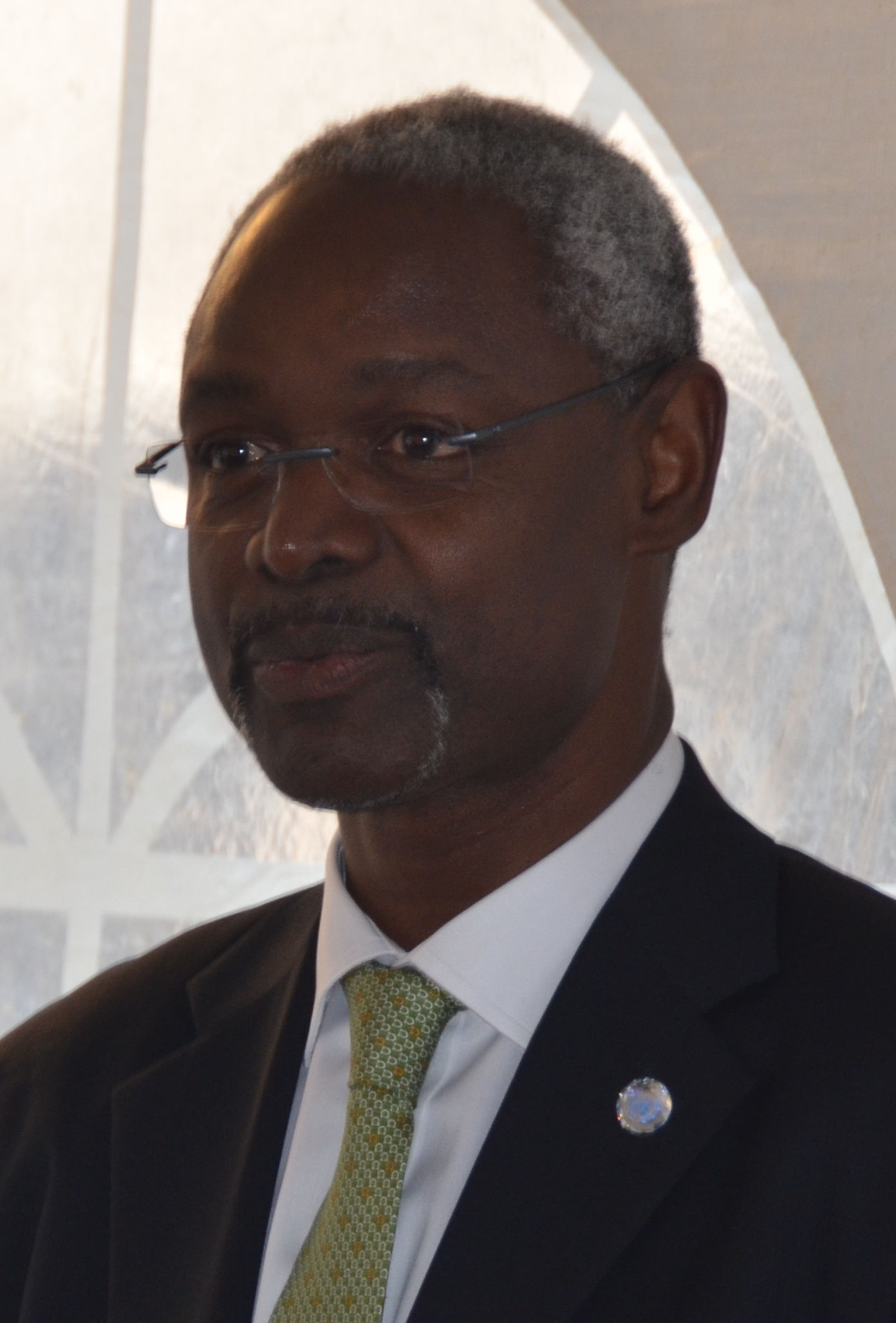
Thiaw in 2016

Thiaw worked in his country's Ministry of Rural Development for 10 years before joining the World Conservation Union (IUCN), where he served ten years holding different positions.

Thiaw joined the United Nations in 2007 as director of the Division of Environmental Policy Implementation (DEPI) at United Nations Environment Programme (UNEP). From 2013 to 2018, he was deputy executive director of UNEP at the level of assistant secretary-general, under the leadership of successive executive directors Achim Steiner and Erik Solheim. He was appointed to this position by United Nations Secretary-General Ban Ki-moon on 2 August 2013. In this capacity, he played a key role in shaping the organization's strategic vision, mid-term strategy and programme of work, and strengthened collaborations with governments and other environmental governing bodies, including the United Nations Environmental Assembly.

Thiaw also served the United Nations Framework Convention on Climate Change as its interim head after Patricia Espinosa stepped down, and started his term on 17 July 2022. He was succeeded in this position by Simon Stiell on 15 August that same year.

== Personal life ==
Thiaw is married and has three children.
