= AFR100 =

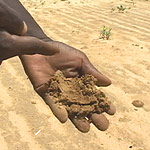
Degraded soil on a farm in Niger.

AFR100 (African Forest Landscape Restoration Initiative) is an international partnership between African nations, financial interests both donor and business, technical organizations, and local interests which aims to restore more than 100 million hectares of land in Africa by 2030. It aims to have these efforts increase food security, combat poverty, and reduce the impacts of climate change within the continent. It is also part of the global Bonn Challenge to restore 150 million hectares by 2020 and 350 million hectares by 2030. As of Nov 29, 2021 they have commitments of 127.77% of their target from 31 African countries.

== History ==
Prior to its launch the initial planning was done in September 2015 at the 14th World Forestry Congress in Durban South Africa. The planned 100 million hectare goal brought about by this were then endorsed by a technical committee within the African Union's Department of Rural Development, Environment and Agriculture in October 2015. It was then launched in December 2015 during the 2015 United Nations Climate Change Conference's Global Landscapes Forum by a group of African nations and technical partners including the New Partnership for Africa's Development (NEPAD), the Federal Ministry for Economic Cooperation and Development (BMZ), and the World Resources Institute (WRI).

== Governance ==
=== Governing Bodies ===
==== AFR100 Secretariat ====
The organization's central communication hub it is housed with the New Partnership for Africa's Development. It acts to coordinate partners to obtain political support, technical assistance, obtain investment, coordinate coalition creation, and act as a central repository for knowledge as well program monitoring.

It acts as a liaison to the Regional Economic Communities (RECs) of the African Union. The secretariat also provides public outreach and communication. This includes both activities such as updating the website and newsletter as well as communication with partner countries, donors, and technical partners. It also manages meetings both formal and ad hoc meetings for everything from those between countries down to technical groups working on specific topics. It receives the organization's financial support and creates the programs annual budget proposals for consideration by the Management team. New members apply to the organization through the Secretariat before confirmation by the Management Team.

==== AFR100 Management Team ====
The management team is made up of the Federal Ministry for Economic Cooperation and Development (BMZ), the Deutsche Gesellschaft für Internationale Zusammenarbeit (GIZ), the International Union for Conservation of Nature and Natural Resources (IUCN), the New Partnership for Africa's Development (NEPAD), the World Bank, and the World Resources Institute (WRI). It also helps to organize technical partnerships for the program. It holds biannual meetings for the program. It also confirms the annual budgets of the program and new members.

==== Technical Partners and Financial Partners ====
Technical partners who contribute or hold significant experience in technical, organizational, or geographic knowledge on forest landscape restoration are invited to join the program to participate in working groups in response to requests. Benefits include preeminent access to program data, the ability to access the program as a test platform for their approaches, as well as potentially compensation for responding to requests.

The case is much the same with financial partners who are selected based on their financial contributions to the program. Benefits include deep access to the program's data about development strategies especially economic and social effects.

=== Meetings/Temporary Groups ===
==== Ad hoc Working Groups ====
These groups are created for providing knowledge for support on technical issues or implementation around specific areas under the ARF100 Secretariat but are primarily self organizing once created. These groups work primarily virtually and are open to all ARF100 partners technical, financial, and participating governments.

==== Annual Partner Meeting (APM) ====
The AFR partner meeting brings together representatives from all partner groups and countries as well as donors, media, and other involved groups. It is hosted once a year by an interested partner country. It is a focal point for exchange of outcomes and future plans with the public at large as well to create connections and share knowledge between partners.

==== AFR 100 Advisory Group ====
This is a large persistent group composed of members with two year terms proposed by the Secretariat and confirmed by the Management Team. Members are composed of representatives from countries, prominent donors, and financial partners. It exists to support the secretariat in advocating for the program, creating and maintaining partnerships, and providing strategic guidance allow the program to run most effectively.

== Strategy ==
=== Guiding Principles ===
AFR100 operates on eight guiding principles for its forest landscape restoration plans.

1. Restore the environment in ways that provide multiple benefits in areas both economic and environmental. There is also not a requirement that the area be restored to its natural state, but rather restored to function and specifically the most beneficial function(s) possible. However, existing natural environments should be maintained in their current state or deficiencies repaired to natural function.
2. Management integrated across scales due to benefits (and costs) being felt across large scales from local effects to regional effects that cross international boundaries.
3. Include multiple simultaneous restoration strategies and objectives within a single area.
4. Conduct interventions based on the decisions of stakeholder groups from all varieties of local groups and demographic groups, private sector interests, and governmental organizations. This including establishing long lasting institutions that integrate this goal.
5. Create and preserve natural ecosystems that are resilient against both the effects short term climate as well as long term changes due to global warming. Both in preservation of biodiversity and economic aspects.
6. Establish systems for continual monitoring of the forest restoration process both to determine whether changes to the programs within the area in how programs are run and whether goals for the area should change. On top of that knowledge gained through this process will be continually used to improve techniques utilized.
7. Ensure coherent national policy as prior commitments and legal frameworks may conflict with plans of AFR100 programs and to ensure stability to encourage outside investment.
8. Implement forest landscape restoration with nationally driven systems as to maintain coherence as without strong guidance measures taken to ensure goals of the program are reached likely to be less or possibly minimally effective

=== Main Restoration Techniques ===
The most common land use strategies fall under three categories: fully forested land, agricultural land, and protective or buffer lands.

Fully forested lands include silviculture to restore existing forests through proper management. Land without forests can be allowed to regenerate on its own or with small/initial assistance to a natural state or made into an actively managed forest for growing and using/selling products of the tree.

Partially forested agricultural lands can be managed fallow lands to restore soil health or agroforestry where trees are co-cropped with other plants at some density from simple windbreaks to high densities that can provide partial shade to the crops.

Buffers fall into two categories. Mangroves forests are important as wetland environments for maintenance of biodiversity and can also act to mitigate storms. Buffers along steep areas as well as watercourses can reduce erosion and flooding.

== Current Partners and Plans ==
Country	Area Contributed (million hectares)	Year Joined	Priority Project Goals/Target effects	Aid Sought from AFR100 Organization and Partners
Benin	0.5	2016	Reforestation; Plantation restoration and management	Financing for restoration
Burundi	2	2015	Establishing and managing tree plantations and agroforestry; Protection of natural parks; Erosion and flood control.; Ecological agriculture; Waterway ecology	AFR100 support
Cameroon	12	2017	Natural and agricultural forest management.; Establishment of mixed environmental and agricultural areas.; Special attention for the three Northern Regions of Cameroon	Technology and techniques in forest restoration; Support for finding financing
Central African Republic	3.5	2016	Main focus is on environmental aspects with a lesser focus on other economic effects.	Scientific analysis of degraded land and drivers of deforestation.; Implementation support and training.
Chad	1.4	2017	Currently undetermined	Technical and financial support.
Côte d'Ivoire	5	2016	Reforestation and restoration of production and park forests with a special emphasis on coastal forest, riparian forests, and wetlands.; Development of co-cropping environmental and production (especially coco) trees.	Support from AFR100
Democratic Republic of the Congo	8	2016	Restoration of deforested and degraded ecosystems for environmental and economic use especially food security and climate change resilience.	ROAM assessment; Implementation assistance; Regional meeting on FLR successes; Roundtable on financing
Eswatini	.5	2017	TBD	TBD
Ethiopia	15	2016	Contribute to fulfilling the Climate Resilient Green Economy goal and middle-income status by 2025.; Forestry contributions for farming and food security.; Climate resilience, Development of techniques to be used to develop land later.	Host public and private investors interested in financing projects which contribute to the goal.; Host meetings between neighboring countries involved in the program.
Ghana	2	2015	Stop and reverse damage caused to transitional and forested areas.; Special focus on the Northern Savannah Ecological zone, part of the Sahel region.	Contribute to Ghana's existing restoration efforts.
Guinea	2	2016	Assist with climate change management, environment, and development goals	Technical support.
Kenya	5.1	2016	Reforestation to 10% forest cover.; Forest restoration for wildlife use.; Agoforestry including as main crop, co-crop, or boundary crop.; Buffers along waterways to reduce erosion.	Identification of target landscapes and methods.; Economic analysis.; Financing analysis.
Liberia	1	2015	Support increased vegetation cover for improved biodiversity, rural economy, and ecosystem services.; Contribute to REDD+ program; Reduce emissions due to loss due to loss of vegetation.	Assistance in financing, planning including priorities, program implementation and monitoring.
Madagascar	4	2015	Milifunctional ecosystem focus to improve overall economy.; Sequester carbon.; Food and water security.; Protect biodiversity.	Assistance in reforestation strategy, locating sources of financing, and technical and organizational support.
Malawi	4.5	2016	Conservation agriculture including farmer lead regeneration and agroforestry.; Community forestry.; Waterway restoration for soil and water conservation.	Assistance in ROAM (restoration opportunities assessment methodology) implementation especially scaling up of existing initiatives.; Help to organize a Southern African forum on forest restoration.; Help mobilize public and private funding.
Mozambique	1	2015	Map degraded land; Establish nurseries; Community managed forests; Allow sustainable charcoal production; Engage in offset management to recreate biodiversity	Assistance in stated goals from AFR100 and organization with other countries partnered with AFR100.
Niger	3.2	2015	Soil and water conservation focused strategies in highlands to maintain water for irrigation of lowlands.; Cooperation with Burkina Faso to manage land and water in arid region vulnerable to drought.; Boost amount of farmer-managed natural regeneration (FMNR) from 60,000 ha/yr to 200,000 ha/yr.; Provide grants and services to incentivize private sector land restoration and management.; Cooperate with TerrAfrica, Great Green Wall, and GEF programs as well as AFR100 to: Collect data about economic benefits of FMNR.; Analyze and potentially change forestry legislation.; Assess community level organization effects.; Engage in cooperation with partners through regular meetings..; Train in ROAM and support mapping and identify priority areas.; Train and assist in scaling up FMNR.; Produce documentary on restoration through FMNR/ANR in Niger.; Organize visits and between partners.; Prepare future project plans.	Provide scientific and technical data on forest management.; Organize carbon sequestration funding for farmers engaging in FMNR.; Assess restoration opportunities.
Republic of the Congo	2	2016	Establish and convert to sustainable tree plantations.; Protect and engage in sustainable forest management.; Develop tree-crop commodity systems.	
Republic of the Sudan	TBD	2017	Reduce poverty and ensure food security.; Adopt integrated land management techniques; Sustainably grow economy thorough production of non-wood products.; Continue to adaptation to and mitigation of climate change management.	Assist in establishing connections to aid project.; Assess local benefits of restoration.; Establish national workshop to set target land area to be restored.; Establish council that will work with AFR100 to assess national restoration opportunities and implementation plans.
Rwanda	2	2011	Support Vision 2020 program and Economic Development and Poverty Reduction Strategy II goals: Boost agricultural productivity.; Increase forest cover and biodiversity.; Establish new crop and livestock practices.; Scientific analysis of most effective and lowest cost interventions as well as sharing such knowledge.; Create investment opportunities for public and private organizations in reforestation programs.	Support implementation of landscape restoration.; Facilitate investor and donor financing of intervention plans.
Senegal	TBD	As yet uncommitted	Establish stakeholders and restoration partners to exchange information and coordinate interventions.; Assess opportunities and potential strategies.; Assist with efforts to establish farmer managed regeneration in the Peanut Basin.; Promote and analyse conservation farming and reforestation efforts.; Organize exchange visits to assist in peer learning and training focusing on FMNR.; Analyse business models for private sector restoration investments.; Work with CSE, USGS, and other partners to develop progress management systems.	Technical and financial assistance.
South Africa	3.6	2017	Conserve water and soil resources through reduction in erosion and desertification.; Clearing invasive plants and restoring vegetation.; Restoring soil and donga.; Further interventions not yet determined.	Technical and financial support.; Establish workshop and institutional arrangements.; Create restoration targets.; Identify financing sources.; Fund scientific and technological research/innovation.
Tanzania	TBD	2016	Gather stakeholders and restoration partners to strengthen information exchange and program collaboration.; Analysis of program success and contributing factors.; Large scale strategy formulation.; Organize exchange visits to assist in peer learning and training.; Establish community level outreach and organization.; Work in finding business opportunities to attract investment from the private sector.; Develop monitoring framework.	"Written expression of interest by Permanent Secretary Mbarak M. Abdulwakil"
Togo	TBD	2015	Restore deforested or degraded land by 20% by 2035 and 30% by 2050.; Special focus on mangrove forests of south east.; Improve economic output and food security; Improve adaptability to and resilience against climate change.	Assessment of land restoration opportunities.
Uganda	2.5	2014	Agroforestry; Woodlots; Natural regeneration	Technical support especially in identifying priority landscapes.
