= Year of the Dolphin =

'Year of the Dolphin' Logo

The year 2007 (extended to 2008) was proposed and declared as the (International) Year of the Dolphin (YoD) by the United Nations and United Nations Environment Programme (UNEP), along with the UN Convention on Migratory Species, and its specialized agreements on dolphin conservation ACCOBAMS and ASCOBANS and the WDCS.

== Background ==
Dolphins are threatened marine mammals with close ties to human history and culture. Living in oceans and rivers, their survival is becoming increasingly difficult. Dolphins need clean and quiet oceans and protected areas.

With their variety of almost 40 species, dolphins are quintessential flagship species for their ecosystem. An ocean in which dolphins can do well is an ocean where all other lifeforms can do well too.

The Year of the Dolphin was part of the United Nations Decade of Education for Sustainable Development. The campaign was also a tangible contribution towards meeting targets to reduce the loss of wildlife by 2010 which all Governments have agreed through the United Nations.

== Campaign ==
The United Nations, member governments, intergovernmental organizations, NGOs and the private sector (e.g. TUI Group) are building a strong alliance to achieve a common objective: to protect dolphins.
A crucial factor in achieving the protection of dolphins is to create awareness of dolphin species, educate, inform decision makers and involve local communities.

The main focus of the campaign was on educational activities and awareness raising. The educational activities were aimed first and foremost at children, with numerous educational manuals, leaflets, posters etc. being distributed to schools and young tourists, e.g. through the network of YoD partner TUI. Numerous NGOs also played an important role in the raising of awareness for the plight of the dolphins.

Some outstanding contributions were made by dedicated individuals, e.g. a young teacher in Mumbai, India visited schools in his city, spreading the word on dolphin conservation to approximately 3000 schoolchildren, their teachers and, by extension, their families. The YoD partners supplied him with educational materials and prizes to give to children who had made special contributions.

Kenya was certainly a hotspot of YoD activities, with a large number of educational events, the dedication of a boat to the patrolling of Marine Protected Areas and an exchange of old fishing gear for sustainable, dolphin-friendly gear, to name only a few.

The website featured in-depth information on the almost 40 species of dolphins, as well as several outstanding conservation projects and articles on some of the activities undertaken in YoD 2007/2008. A more complete view of the YoD's activities and achievements was given on the YoD website.

== Patron and ambassadors ==
The designated Patron of the Year of the Dolphin was H.S.H. Prince Albert II of Monaco, who formally launched the year on 17 September 2006. The Prince released a statement reading, "The Year of the Dolphin gives me the opportunity to renew my firm commitment towards protecting marine biodiversity. With this strong initiative we can make a difference to save these fascinating marine mammals from the brink of extinction."

The YoD had several ambassadors, among them several swimmers and sailors, as well as the author of the book "In defense of Dolphins", a book highlighting the complexity and many fascinating aspects of dolphin social structure and behaviour. It focuses on the definition of 'personhood' and the implications this definition has for the classification of dolphins as persons and their legal and moral standing. The book's author is Prof. Thomas White.

== Partners ==
- ACCOBAMS
- ASCOBANS
- TUI Group
- Convention on Migratory Species
- United Nations Educational, Scientific and Cultural Organization
- United Nations Environment Programme
- Whale and Dolphin Conservation Society

== Public perception and opinions ==
The following is the opinion of Welsh NGO Sea Trust:

"In 2006 Sea Trust became aware of the proposed Year of the Dolphin and offered support. We were welcomed as supporters and planned a whole years worth of events and activities in support of the campaign. Our hope of was that YoD would unite small NGO's such as ourselves all around the world and give us the opportunity to support a UN led world wide effort to create an environment of worldwide awareness and condemnation of those who endanger the future of dolphins living free and secure.

Soon after we became uneasy about the partnership of the YoD with sponsor TUI who offer visits to captive cetacean facilities to their clients. At the same time TUI's website featured a dolphinarium in the Dominican Republic. Our point was that TUI were indirectly profiting from the trade in captive dolphins by providing customers for the captive dolphin shows. Dolphins are taken from the wild and sold for 40,000 dollars each to captive dolphin shows around the world. Put simply, ultimately uninformed or gullible tourists pay for these hunts.

TUI may not at the time have been aware of the full implications. Having been informed, we hoped they might make amends, using their considerable influence in the world of mass tourism to clean up this growing threat to wild dolphin populations. Our options were to ignore the problem or try to get something done, especially with regards to TUI claiming to be a company with a green outlook, gaining credibility from our support and that of other NGO's.

No immediate action was taken and we were without any written explanation wiped from the YoD website and the YoD supporters list. The YoD Partners then took credit (I don't think they took sole credit for this, I'm sure your alliance of NGOs had a big role in laying the foundation; however, I suspect a letter from the UN is more likely to elicit action from the DRs president than 100 letters from NGOs; how about calling it synergy..') for "persuading" the Dominican Republic not to take more dolphins from Taiji, when we and other conservation groups made them aware of these issues."

— Cliff Benson, Director Sea Trust www.seatrust.org.uk

(see discussion forum)

== See also ==
- 2006: International Year of Deserts and Desertification
- 2007–2009: International Year of Planet Earth
- United Nations International Years
