= Simon Stiell =

Grenadian politician

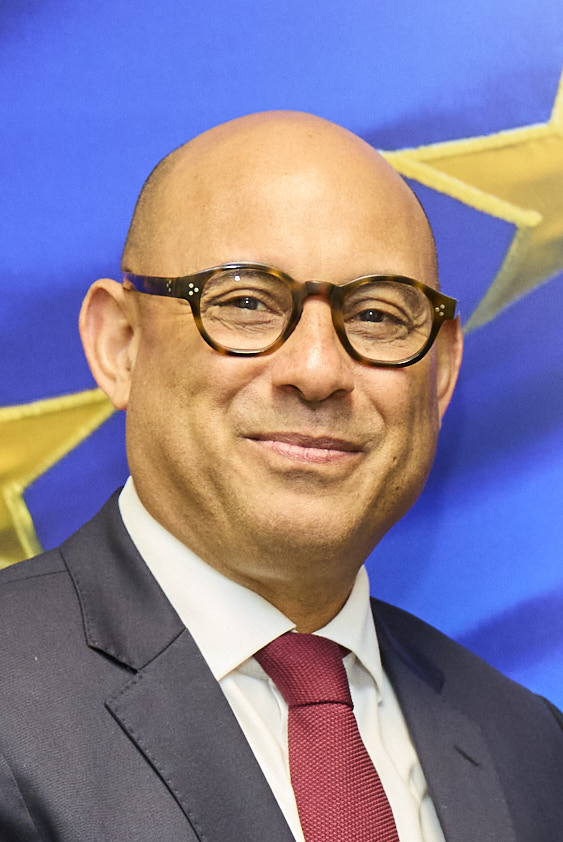
- Stiell in 2026

Executive Secretary of the United Nations Framework Convention on Climate Change
- Incumbent
- Assumed office August 2022
- Preceded by: Patricia Espinosa

Minister of Climate Resilience, the Environment, Forestry, Fisheries, Disaster Management and Information
- In office March 2018 – June 2022

Personal details
- Party: New National Party
- Education: University of Westminster
- Occupation: Engineer, politician

Simon Emmanuel Kervin Stiell is a Grenadian politician, serving as the executive secretary of the United Nations Framework Convention on Climate Change since August 2022. He indirectly succeeded Patricia Espinosa as the head of the UNFCCC, though Ibrahim Thiaw briefly served on an interim basis. Stiell previously served as Grenada's environment, education, and human resources minister.

== Career ==
Stiell is an engineer and studied for an MBA at the University of Westminster. Prior to his political career, he worked in the technology sector for 14 years outside Grenada. He worked for Nokia and GEC Plessey Telecommunications. Stiell moved back to Grenada after his technology career and established a property development company. He also chaired the country's tourism board and chamber of commerce.

=== Political career ===
In 2013, Stiell was appointed to the Senate of Grenada, as a member of the New National Party. He served as a junior minister for agriculture, environment, and human resources development. From 2017 to 2018, Stiell was the cabinet minister of education and human resources development. In March 2018, he was appointed the country's environment and climate resilience minister. Stiell continued until June 2022, when his New National Party lost a general election.
