= International Year of Deserts and Desertification =

The year 2006 was declared the International Year of Deserts and Desertification by the United Nations General Assembly. The Year aims to raise $20 million from industry and governments and will spend half on co-funding research, and half on "outreach" activities. It will be the biggest ever international effort to promote the Earth sciences. Apart from researchers, who are expected to benefit under the Year's Science Programme, the principal target groups for the Year's broader messages are:

- Decision makers and politicians who need to be better informed about the how Earth scientific knowledge can be used for sustainable development
- The voting public, which needs to know how Earth scientific knowledge can contribute to a better society
- Geoscientists, who are very knowledgeable about various aspects of the Earth but who need help in using their knowledge for the benefit of the world’s population.

The research themes of the year, set out in 10 science prospectuses were chosen for their societal relevance, multidisciplinarity and outreach potential. The Year has 12 Founding Partners, 23 Associate Partners and is backed politically by 97 countries, representing 87% of the world’s population. The Year was promoted politically at UNESCO and at the United Nations in New York by the People’s Republic of Tanzania.

The Year is open to Expressions of Interest from researchers within each of its 10 themes. The Outreach programme of the year is also now open to expressions of interest, and will work in a similar way by receiving and responding to bids for support from individuals and organisations worldwide.

The Year's Project Leader is former IUGS President Professor Eduardo F J de Mulder. The Year's Science Committee is chaired by Prof. Edward Derbyshire (Royal Holloway) and its Outreach Committee by Dr Ted Nield (Geological Society of London).

The International Year of Planet Earth project was initiated jointly by the International Union of Geological Sciences (IUGS) and the United Nations Educational Scientific and Cultural Organisation (UNESCO) . The

UN press release reads: "By a draft on the International Year of Planet Earth, 2008, which the Committee approved without a vote on 11 November, the Assembly would declare 2008 the International Year of Planet Earth. It would also designate the United Nations Educational, Scientific and Cultural Organization (UNESCO) to organize activities to be undertaken during the Year, in collaboration with UNEP and other relevant United Nations bodies, the International Union of Geological Sciences and other Earth sciences societies and groups throughout the world. Also by that draft, the Assembly would encourage Member States, the United Nations system and other actors to use the Year to increase awareness of the importance of Earth sciences in achieving sustainable development and promoting local, national, regional and international action"

The Year’s research themes are listed below.

The Project is backed by the following Founding Partners: International Union of Geodesy and Geophysics (IUGG); the International Geographical Union (IGU) ; the International Union of Soil Sciences (IUSS) ; the International Lithosphere Programme (ILP) ; the National Geological Survey of the Netherlands (NITG-TNO); The Geological Society of London (GSL); the International Soil Reference and Information Centre (ISRIC) ; A consortium of the International Association of Engineering Geologists and the Environment (IAEG) , the International Society of Rock Mechanics (ISRM) and the International Society of Soil Mechanics and Geotechnical Engineering (ISSMGE) ; the International Union for Quaternary Research (INQUA) ; the American Geological Institute (AGI); the American Association of Petroleum Geologists (AAPG) ; the American Institute of Professional Geologists (AIPG) .

The Year enjoys the support of 23 Associate Partners, including all major international geoscientific and other relevant organisations: ICSU International Council for Science; IOC Intergovernmental Oceanographic Commission of UNESCO; IPA International Permafrost Association ; IAGOD International Association on the Genesis of Ore Deposits; SEG Society of Economic Geologists; SGA Society for Geology Applied to Mineral Deposits; IAH International Association of Hydrogeologists; IGCP International Geoscience Programme; EFG European Federation of Geologists; AARSE African Association of Remote Sensing of the Environment; SCA Science Council of Asia; ProGEO European Association for the Conservation of the Geological Heritage; SEPM Society for Sedimentary Geology; CCOP Coordinating Committee for Geoscience Programmes in East and Southeast Asia; GSAf Geological Society of Africa; UNU United Nations University; AGID Association of Geoscientists for International Development; UN/ISDR United Nations International Strategy for Disaster Reduction; NESF North-eastern Science Foundation (USA); AASG Association of American State Geologists; ISPRS International Society of Photogrammetry and Remote Sensing; GSA Geological Society of America; NACSN North American Committee for Stratigraphic Nomenclature.

== Objectives ==
The Year's Objective is to spread awareness about the desert areas of the world and especially the problem of desertification.

== Themes ==
The Year's research themes are deserts and especially the problem of desertification.

== See also ==
- 2007:International Year of Planet Earth
- World Day to Combat Desertification and Drought
- United Nations Convention to Combat Desertification
