= Patricia Espinosa =

Mexican politician and diplomat

Patricia Espinosa Cantellano
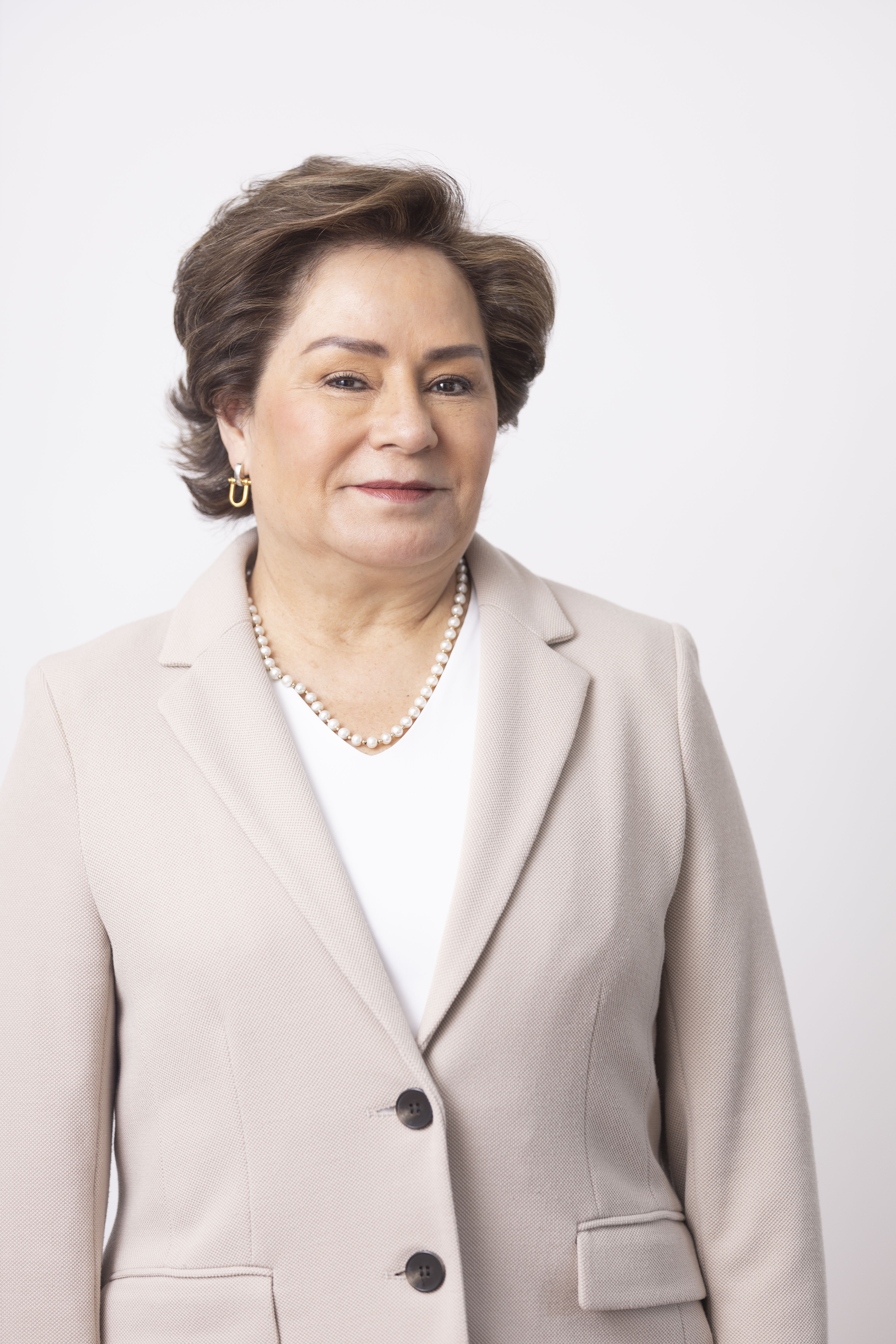

Executive Secretary of the United Nations Framework Convention on Climate Change
- In office 18 July 2016 – 15 July 2022
- Preceded by: Christiana Figueres
- Succeeded by: Simon Stiell (Acting)

Ambassador of Mexico to Germany
- In office 6 September 2013 – 18 July 2016

Secretary of Foreign Affairs
- In office December 1, 2006 – December 1, 2012
- President: Felipe Calderón
- Preceded by: Luis Ernesto Derbez
- Succeeded by: José Antonio Meade Kuribreña

Personal details
- Born: Patricia Espinosa Cantellano; October 21, 1958 (age 67) Mexico City, Mexico
- Relations: Married
- Education: El Colegio de México Graduate Institute of International Studies
- Profession: Diplomat

Patricia Espinosa Cantellano (born October 21, 1958) is a Mexican diplomat who served as the executive secretary of the United Nations Framework Convention on Climate Change from 2016 to 2022. She was Secretary of Foreign Affairs in the cabinet of President Felipe Calderón; and served as Mexican Ambassador to Austria, Germany, Slovenia and Slovakia. Because of her diplomatic career, she was appointed Ambassador Emeritus of Mexico in 2012.

== Early life and education ==
Patricia Espinosa Cantellano graduated with a bachelor's degree in International Relations from El Colegio de México and earned a diploma in International Law at the Graduate Institute of International and Development Studies in Switzerland. She is married and has two children.

== Diplomatic career ==
Espinosa Cantellano joined the Foreign Service on September 16, 1981.

Ambassador Cantellano has served as responsible for economic affairs, Permanent Mission of Mexico to UN, Geneva (1982–88); Head, Cabinet to Undersecretary of Foreign Affairs (1989–91); Director of International Organizations (1991–93); assigned to Permanent Mission of Mexico to UN, New York (1993–97); President of the Third Committee, UN General Assembly (1996–97); and General Director of Regional Organizations of the Americas, Ministry of Foreign Affairs, Coordinator for Rio Group, Iberoamerican Summit, Summit of Americas and Summit of Latin America and Caribbean with European Union (1997–99).

She was promoted to Ambassador within the Foreign Service in 2000 and served at the Mexican Embassy in Germany from January 2001 to June 2002; leaving the post to serve as Ambassador to Austria, concurrently with a number of international organizations based in Vienna, from 2002 to 2006.

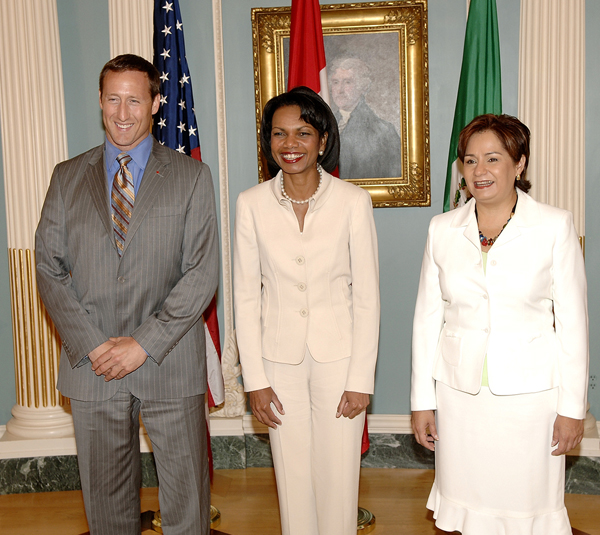
Espinosa (right) with Condoleezza Rice and Peter Mackay

On November 28, 2006, President-elect Felipe Calderón announced that she would serve as his Secretary of Foreign Affairs starting on December 1, 2006.

As Secretary of Foreign Affairs of the Mexican Government, she:

- Organized the first-ever G-20 Summit in an emergency country (2012);
- Conducted the 16th United Nations Climate Change Conference (COP16) to successfully adopt the "Cancun Agreements", reinstating credibility and trust in multilateral process after the failed conference in Copenhagen (2009);
- Improved and strengthened the bilateral relationship with the United States through close dialogue and cooperation mechanisms on al relevant issues;
- Coordinated the international outreach related to the H1N1 pandemic, which initiated in Mexico; and
- Piloted negotiations resulting in the creation of the Community of Latin American and Caribbean Stated -a milestone in the history of the region-, and in the establishment of the Pacific Alliance (an integration mechanism composed of Chile, Colombia, Mexico and Peru).

Because of her outstanding career as a Mexican diplomat, she was appointed Ambassador Emeritus of Mexico in 2012.

From 2012 to 2016, she was again Ambassador of Mexico to Germany. Post where she drove efforts to strengthen the bilateral relationship, particularly to promote Mexico's economic opportunities, which led to an increase in German investment and bilateral trade growth.

In May 2016, Espinosa was selected by United Nations Secretary-General Ban Ki-moon to be the Executive Secretary of the United Nations Framework Convention on Climate Change. Under her leadership, she led the transformation of the organization towards supporting the full implementation of the Paris Agreement globally.

== Awards and decorations ==
- Ambassador Emeritus of Mexico – highest honor given to five outstanding Mexican diplomats.
- Awarded the German Sustainability Prize in 2012
- Awarded the Sustainability Prize in 2019 by the Saxon Hans-Carl von Carlowitz Society.
- Decorated by the governments of Germany, Argentina, Austria, Chile, Colombia, Denmark, El Salvador, Guatemala, Netherlands, Paraguay and Peru.

== Other contributions ==
- Member of the High-Level Panel of Eminent Persons on the 2030 Agenda.
- Commissioner at the Global Commission of Adaptation
- High-Level Consultative Group for the InsuResilience Global Partnership
- Founder of the Berlin-Bonn chapter of the International Gender Champions
- Member of the Advisory Board of the Mary Robinson Foundation – Climate Justice
- Member of the OECD High-Level Advisory Group
- Member of The Global Covenant of Mayors for Climate & Energy Board
- International Gender Champions (IGC), Member

Political offices
Preceded by Luis Ernesto Derbez	Secretary of Foreign Affairs; 1 December 2006–December 2012	Succeeded by José Antonio Meade Kuribreña
