= Africover =

United Nations satellite data project

Africover is a United Nations project which collects and collates geographical information on Africa using satellites. It gathers data on areas such as land usage, climate conditions and it also locates natural resources. One major usage of this system has been to provide flood warnings to governments and NGOs, who then pass the information onto farmers.
