= Assisted natural regeneration =

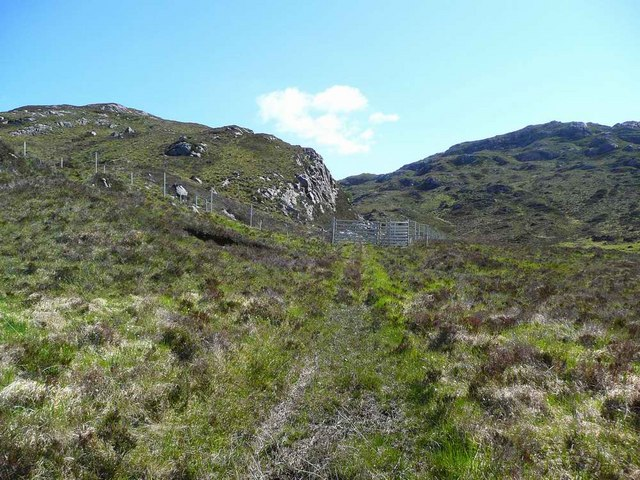
Deer fence and gate on the Tubeg track. This part of the south side of Loch Assynt has been fenced off to assist natural regeneration of the tree cover. So far, there are few trees showing, despite the OS mapping showing this as a wooded area.

Assisted natural regeneration (ANR) (also termed managed regrowth) is the human protection and preservation of natural tree seedlings in forested areas. Seedlings are, in particular, protected from undergrowth and extremely flammable plants such as Imperata grass. Though there is no formal definition or methodology, the overall goal of ANR is to create and improve forest productivity. It typically involves the reduction or removal of barriers to natural regeneration such as soil degradation, competition with weeds, grasses or other vegetation, and protection against disturbances, which can all interfere with growth. In addition to protection efforts, new trees are planted when needed or wanted (enrichment planting). With ANR, forests grow faster than they would naturally, resulting in a significant contribution to carbon sequestration efforts. It also serves as a cheaper alternative to reforestation due to decreased nursery needs.

The most effective way to implement ANR is very site-specific, and many nations provide guidebooks on how to select and maintain an ANR project.

== Current practice and history ==
ANR is a common practice in many Asian countries. This method of protection has been used on Imperata grasslands in the Philippines for over three decades, as well as in China for more than five decades.

According to the Food and Agriculture Organization of the United Nations (FAO), China has since 1999 funded extensive ANR in an effort to prevent soil corrosion in particular. Also the FAO reports that ANR is a common practice in Thailand.

ANR is gaining popularity as global climate change becomes a growing concern.

ANR has typically been used most often in tropical forests, however, it is now being used to help restore forested areas across all ecosystem types.

== Requirements ==
A wide variety of conditions are required to optimally implement ANR and ensure successful regeneration. One involves a sufficient density of naturally regenerated seedlings, though the specific density required is dependent on specific factors, such as, distribution, species composition, growth rates, soil fertility, etc. A density range of 200 to 800 seedlings per hectare has been suggested to ensure optimal regeneration. The availability of seed sources from nearby remnant forests is necessary to serve as seed inputs for colonization of vegetation. The control or removal of all disturbances (such as, grazing, fires, and logging) is also crucial.

== Benefits ==
=== Economical ===
The practice of ANR has a wide range of benefits. ANR focuses on reducing ecological barriers in order to accelerate natural regeneration and growth, rather than the planting of seedlings. This allows for a low-cost method that removes the expenses associated with site preparation and planting/raising seedlings themselves, which can be appealing in large-scale restoration projects. Another benefit involves job opportunities. ANR requires high maintenance and can be labor-intensive, and involve methods of weeding, grass pressing, establishing and maintaining firebreaks, etc. This can ultimately help to create jobs and improve livelihoods in local and/or impoverished communities. However, if the forestation is not a positive change, for example, if the land is needed for food, the people of the community will be unlikely to get involved and produce successful ANR.

=== Environmental ===
Carbon sequestration, biodiversity enrichment and recovery are just a few environmental benefits ANR provides, which can help improve ecosystems and mitigate climate change. ANR focuses on native species and natural succession of existing vegetation, which ensures that plant communities and inhabiting wildlife are maintained and are not disturbed.
