= Desertification in Africa =

Causes and effects of land degradation

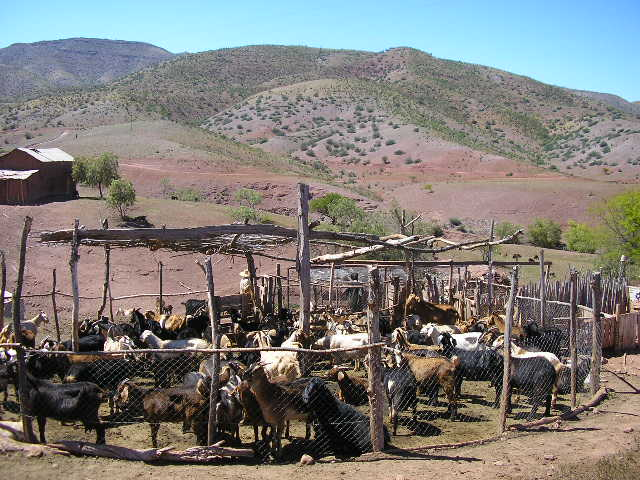
An image showing a barren, dry landscape with cracks on the ground, indicative of desertification in Africa

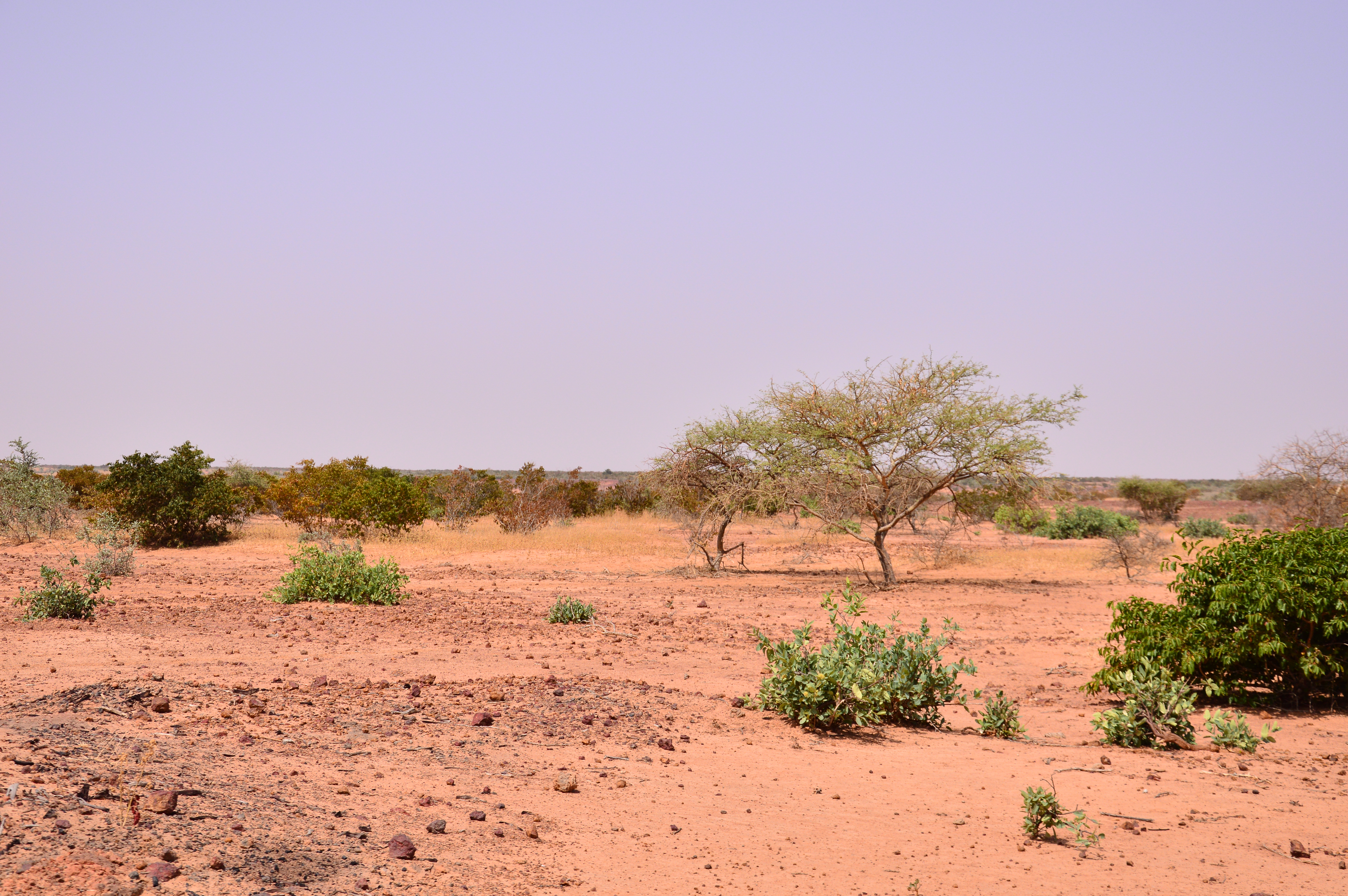
Semi-arid Niger is at risk for further desertification.

Desertification in Africa is a form of land degradation that involves the conversion of productive land into desert or arid areas. This issue is a pressing environmental concern that poses a significant threat to the livelihoods of millions of people in Africa who depend on the land for subsistence. Geographical and environmental studies have recently coined the term desertification. Desertification is the process by which a piece of land becomes a desert, as the word desert implies. The loss or destruction of the biological potential of the land is referred to as desertification. It reduces or eliminates the potential for plant and animal production on the land and is a component of the widespread ecosystem degradation. Additionally, the term desertification is specifically used to describe the deterioration of the world's drylands, or its arid, semi-arid, and sub-humid climates. These regions may be far from the so-called natural or climatic deserts, but they still experience irregular water stress due to their low and variable rainfall. They are especially susceptible to damage from excessive human land use pressure. The causes of desertification are a combination of natural and human factors, with climate change exacerbating the problem. Despite this, there is a common misconception that desertification in Africa is solely the result of natural causes like climate change and soil erosion. In reality, human activities like deforestation, overgrazing, and unsustainable agricultural practices contribute significantly to the issue. Another misconception is that, desertification is irreversible, and that degraded land will forever remain barren wastelands. However, it is possible to restore degraded land through sustainable land management practices like reforestation and soil conservation. A 10.3 million km2 area, or 34.2% of the continent's surface, is at risk of desertification. If the deserts (Sahara and Kalahari) are taken into account, the affected and potentially affected area is roughly 16.5 million km2 or 54.6% of all of Africa. 5.7 percent of the continent's surface is made up of very severe regions, 16.2 percent by severe regions, and 12.3 percent by moderate to mild regions.

== Various degrees of desertification ==
According to three criteria: climate, inherent vulnerability, and human and animal pressure, the United Nations recognizes four degrees of desertification hazards: very severe, severe, moderate, and slight. When land becomes completely unusable, it is said to have experienced very severe desertification. Examples of this include moving dunes, extensive large gully systems, and salt-crusted, nearly impervious soils in previously irrigated areas. These circumstances are thought to be economically irreversible. Severe desertification and moderate desertification are classified according to the extent of accelerated soil erosion and denudation, the change to less desirable vegetation, or the loss of crop yield due to reversible salinization or irrigated soils. Where there has been little to no degradation of the plant cover or soil, it is represented by the second category, slight desertification.

== History ==
The term desertification is most often associated with French botanist André Aubréville's 1949 work on African rainforests, although research claims that it may be traced back to 19th-century French colonial North Africa. The Comité d'Etudes commissioned research to investigate the prehistoric growth of the Sahara Desert, which was caused by natural occurrences at the time. The phenomenon has been around for thousands of years in Africa and is not new. However, as populations have grown and human activity has increased, desertification has exacerbated significantly in recent decades.

Desertification can be traced back thousands of years in Africa, with evidence discovered in ancient literature and archaeological documents. However, the magnitude and severity of the problem have grown in recent decades as a result of a mix of natural and human factors. Desertification became an increasingly severe issue in Africa over the twentieth century, causing widespread environmental deterioration and jeopardizing the livelihoods of millions of people who rely on the land for food. In response, governments, non-governmental groups, and international organizations have devised a variety of solutions, including reforestation, soil conservation, and sustainable land management methods.

Over the past century, the Sahara desert has been expanding by more than 7,600 sq km a year and is now 10% larger than it was in 1920. Desertification and desert growth were not first caused primarily by human-induced climate change, as they are now. The world's greatest deserts were generated by natural processes that interacted over time, such as water evaporation, rising winds, warm airfall, and low humidity. Human activity, on the other hand, has recently come to either expand or contract these deserts. To put Africa's contributions into context, the Sahara has been quickly expanding since the 1920s, spanning 10% more territory than it did previously, according to a study conducted by National Science Foundation (NSF) funded scientists at the University of Maryland (UMD). The drought of the 1980s was not the first man-made disaster to hit the Sahel region. The desert has been subjected to a lengthy succession of droughts, the most notable of which was the Sahelian drought and famine of 1968. It continued until 1985 and was directly responsible for approximately 100,000 deaths and the disturbance of millions of lives. Human resource exploitation (such as overgrazing and deforestation) was first thought to be the sole cause of the drought. Nonetheless, large-scale climate changes may have contributed to the drought. Despite being the most severely impacted region in Africa, the Sahel is not the only one afflicted by desertification. The Karoo in South Africa, has experienced semi-arid conditions for the last 500 years, Somalia, which has experienced three major drought crises in the last decade alone, and Ethiopia, which has seen 75% of its land affected by desertification and a major famine between 1983 and 1985.

== Causes ==
According to some academics, human causes only play a very minor supportive role in the processes of desertification, with climate being the main cause. Other researchers reverse the significance of these two factors. Desertification in Africa is caused by both natural and man-made forces. Climate change, which has resulted in increased aridity and decreasing rainfall in many regions, and soil erosion, which happens naturally but can be exacerbated by human activity, are the principal natural elements that lead to desertification. For instance, it might be difficult to tell if desertification or desert expansion is the result of climate change or human activity. Desertification in Africa is exacerbated by human factors such as deforestation, overgrazing, and unsustainable farming methods such as monoculture and excessive use of chemical fertilizers. For example, deforestation reduces the quantity of plants that may anchor soil and protect it from erosion, whereas overgrazing depletes vegetation and exposes soil to erosion and degradation. For instance, it has been argued that the Sahara's edges are primarily the result of human activity, with climate playing merely a supporting role. A third group assigns almost equal blame to man and the environment. Poor land management techniques, such as crop rotation, the use of heavy machinery that compacts soil, and unsustainable water management methods, all contribute to desertification. Mining and oil exploration can also contribute to desertification by disturbing natural ecosystems and reducing soil quality. Population expansion and poverty can exacerbate the situation by increasing resource demand and resulting in unsustainable land use practices. All of these causes have contributed to the degradation of fertile soil, posing a serious threat to the livelihoods of millions of Africans who rely on the land for subsistence.

In the Sahel, desertification is mostly attributed to wind erosion. To put it simply, wind erosion is the phenomenon when a strong wind removes a field's topsoil. Wind erosion depletes the nutrients in the soil because the topsoil often contains more nutrients than the subsoil. This lowers the production of the soil. Furthermore, the loss of topsoil can expose the subsurface with inferior physical qualities, which lowers the permeability of the soil. Furthermore, wind erosion can hinder crop growth by burying crops beneath blown sand and causing physical harm (abrasion).

== Affected areas ==
Three different regions of the continent are affected by desertification: Mediterranean Africa, the Sudano-Sahelian region, and Africa south of the Sudano-Sahelian. Severe and very severe areas are to be found in the five Mediterranean countries of Africa: Egypt, Algeria, Libya, Morocco, and Tunisia. The Gasfa Peninsula in Tunisia is a prime example of a region in the Mediterranean that has undergone very severe or irreversible conditions of desertification. Most of the 19 countries in the Sudano-Sahelian region experience similar conditions (severe to very severe), whereas most of Africa south of the Sudano-Sahelian experiences mild to severe risks associated with desertification. About 36 African nations are affected by drought and desertification collectively. The Sahel region, which includes Senegal, Mauritania, Mali, Niger, Chad, Sudan, and Eritrea, has been plagued by frequent droughts, overgrazing, and deforestation, resulting in soil deterioration and desertification. In a restricted sense, the term Sahel region refers to an area that spans around 400 km from north to south and approximately 4000 km from east to west along the southern ridges of the Sahara Desert and experiences 200 to 600 mm of annual rainfall on average. In this location, the little quantity of rainfall mixed with the less productive and highly sandy soil (explained in detail below) is generating chronic food shortages, and a catastrophic famine can be precipitated when the region is afflicted by drought. In 1974, at least 750,000 people in Mali, Niger, and Mauritania had to rely solely on food aid to survive, and during the drought that lasted from 1972 to 1984, at least 100,000 people died. According to the United Nations Department of Economic and Social Affairs World Population Prospects, the six Sahel countries had a population of about 30 million people at that time. Long-term droughts and exploitation of natural resources have plagued the Horn of Africa which comprises Somalia, Ethiopia, and Kenya. Land degradation has occurred in Southern Africa, including Zimbabwe, Botswana, Namibia, and South Africa, as a result of unsustainable farming techniques, overgrazing, and deforestation. Desertification has also affected North Africa, which includes Egypt, Libya, Algeria, Tunisia, and Morocco, as a result of climate change, overgrazing, and unsustainable agricultural practices. Food and water shortages, population displacement, and biodiversity loss are all repercussions of desertification in these places, underscoring the critical need for sustainable land use practices and environmental conservation initiatives throughout Africa.

== Agriculture ==
Desertification affects roughly 45% of Africa's land area, with 55% at high or extremely high risk of future degradation. Climate change and desertification have a significant impact on food security through their effects on agricultural productivity. Substantial data is pointing to the negative effects of climate change and desertification not just on crop yields, but also on agricultural productivity and income losses in dry lands. Forecasts for Sub-Saharan Africa indicate that rising temperatures, an increase in the number of heat waves, and increased aridity will have an impact on rain-fed agricultural systems. Climate change would reduce mean yields for 11 main world crops - millet, eld pea, sugar beet, sweet potato, wheat, rice, maize, soybean, groundnut, sunflower, and rapeseed - by 15% in Sub-Saharan Africa and 11% in the Middle East and North Africa by 2050 if carbon fertilization is not used. Desertification has reduced agricultural output and incomes while also contributing to biodiversity loss in many dryland regions. It is also expected to lower crop and livestock output, change the makeup of plant species, and reduce biological diversity throughout dry lands. Crop production in Sub-Saharan Africa, in particular, may be reduced by 17-22% by 2050 as a result of climate change. In 2017, around 821 million people worldwide were food insecure, with Africa accounting for 31%. Sub-Saharan Africa, notably East Africa, had the world's greatest proportion of undernourished people in 2017, with 28.8% and 31.4%, respectively. Long-term monitoring in North Africa (1978-2014) revealed the disappearance of significant perennial plant species owing to drought and desertification, such as Stipa tenacissima and Artemisia herba alba.

In the northern part of the sahel, where rainfall is scarce, livestock farming based on nomadic grazing is practiced; in the southern part of the country, where rainfall is more than the cultivation limit (annual precipitation of approximately 300 mm), drought-resistant crops like pearl millet (Pennisetum glaucum (L.) R. Br.), sorghum (Sorghum bicolor (L.) Moench), cowpeas (Vigna unguiculata (L.) Walp), and peanuts (Arachis hypogaea L.) are grown without irrigation. Nevertheless, because of its proximity to the cultivation limit, the wide variations in annual rainfall, and the occurrence of dry spells, it is challenging to maintain a consistent yield. Along permanent rivers like the Niger River, rice is also grown. Another characteristic of agriculture in the Sahel region is the mix of crop farming and livestock farming. A symbiotic system is formed here. After pearl millet or sorghum has been harvested by the crop farmers, the livestock farmers graze their livestock (cows, sheep and goats) in the field and manure is returned to the land. The primary technique for preserving soil fertility is the incorporation of domestic waste into fields that are closer to the village or settlement (less than 1 km). Fields that are farther away from the village or settlement are primarily left fallow, while fields that are closer to the settlement are primarily used for night corralling, a system in which livestock are housed in a field overnight, supplying the field with manure and urine.

== Economic impact ==
Great green wall map

Desertification has substantial economic consequences in Africa, particularly in places where agriculture and natural resource utilization are the predominant sources of revenue. Desertification reduces crop yields, causes food shortages, and increases poverty in impacted populations by destroying fertile land and water supplies. People displaced as a result of desertification can lead to increased competition for scarce resources and conflicts, worsening economic issues. Desertification's detrimental effects on ecosystems and biodiversity can have far-reaching consequences for industries like tourism and ecotourism, which rely on healthy ecosystems to attract tourists. Desertification has enormous economic ramifications in Africa, necessitating persistent efforts to minimize the effects of desertification through sustainable land use practices, conservation, and restoration of degraded lands.

== Combating desertification ==
With the Sahel region being the most vulnerable and extensively affected by desertification, a project known as the Great Green Wall was launched in 2007 for the Sahara and Sahel. Its lofty goal is to create an 8,000-kilometer natural wonder over Africa's whole width in order to enhance the quantity of fertile land bordering the Sahara desert. The premise is that, planting more trees will help to prevent desertification, create jobs, improve food security, and return displaced Africans home.

== See also ==
- Rainwater harvesting in the Sahel
