= Terrafrica partnership =

The TerrAfrica partnership is a US$4 billion, 12-year campaign supported by the African Union, World Bank, United Nations, European Commission, and regional sub-Saharan African governments, and aimed at fighting current, and preventing future desertification and other land degradation in Africa through sustainable land management (SLM).

It began October 2005.

== Involvement & Partnership ==
=== The World Bank ===
The World Bank provided support to the initiative through the creation of the TerrAfrica Leveraging Fund (TLF), which designated increased financing to the agriculture departments of national governments so they could invest in technology to aid in the transition to sustainable land practices and accelerate the rate of implementation. The TLF has financed regional meetings between partner countries to share knowledge of sustainable practices with one another and has sponsored the inclusion of sustainable land practices into the regional climate change policies of member countries. So far, the TLF has provided $11.3 million towards the goals of the TerrAfrica project, which in turn has led to the investment of $2 billion in sustainable land management projects in partner countries.

=== The Food and Agriculture Organization ===
The Food and Agriculture Organization (FAO) has provided support for the project through sharing extensive research on sustainable agriculture practices, assisting regional governments in making SLM choices that make the most efficient use out of available land. The FAO's assistance has proved crucial for funding to equip African farmers with improved technology to increase efficiency without soil degradation, and in land resource planning for local and national governments.

== Sustainable Land Management ==
=== Importance ===
Transition to SLM practices in Sub-Saharan Africa is vital due to the high reliance on the agricultural sector in regional economies and the vulnerability of African land to climate degradation. This vulnerability is characterized by a lack of capacity to adapt, but SLM practices increase the resilience of these African economies against the economic shocks that arise from continued ecosystem degradation. SLM practices benefit Sub-Saharan African nations in 3 dimensions - ecologically, socially, and economically. Ecologically, these practices scale back the extent of desertification and assist in farmland restoration. Socially, SLM protects the livelihoods of millions of people who depend on agriculture for survival, strengthening food security in the region. Economically, the investment in SLM practices prevents production loss and contributes to improvements in large-scale farming, fostering economic growth.

=== Implementation ===
SLM practices that have been implemented include agroforestry, water management, and crop rotations. Agroforestry involves planting trees in close proximity to crops to naturally assist in protection against droughts due to the extensive root network of the trees that provides the crops with more water and nutrients from the soil. Agroforestry supports sustainable water management because of the role that forests play in trapping water for storage and reallocation as a natural watershed. Another sustainable water practice TerrAfrica promotes is small-scale irrigation, which faces less institutional and bureaucratic obstacles than large-scale irrigation systems. Additionally, its flexibility provides incentives for individual farmers to implement. The implementation of sustainable water practices is necessary as a result of demand from the rapidly increasing population of Sub-Saharan Africa. The TerrAfrica project promotes sustainable agriculture techniques such as crop rotations and intercropping to increase crop yields and prevent destruction from pests and weeds. Crop rotation involves planting different types of crops together in the same field as opposed to monoculture - planting only one type of crop on the same land. Crop rotations act as a natural form of pest and weed control, and decrease the reliance of crops on one soil location, allowing for continual planting and harvesting. Intercropping refers to the practice of planting two crops in close proximity to one another in a field, which helps maximize soil efficiency and prevent waste.

== Results ==
=== Regional impact ===
The TerrAfrica campaign resulted in the creation of the Strategic Investment Program (SIP), which has provided an additional investment of around $150 million towards sustainable land management. Positive results from the TerrAfrica partnership include the adoption of sustainable land management practices at the national level in many of the member countries. For example, funding from the World Bank made it possible for Ethiopia to pursue watershed development strategies at a national level. Additionally, the Rwandan government has implemented agroforestry and forest restoration projects at the national level, marking 2035 as the target date for significant ecosystem restoration and concurrent sustainable economic development.

== See also ==
- United Nations Convention to Combat Desertification
