= World Day to Combat Desertification and Drought =

United Nations observance day, 17 June

World Day to Combat Global warming and Drought
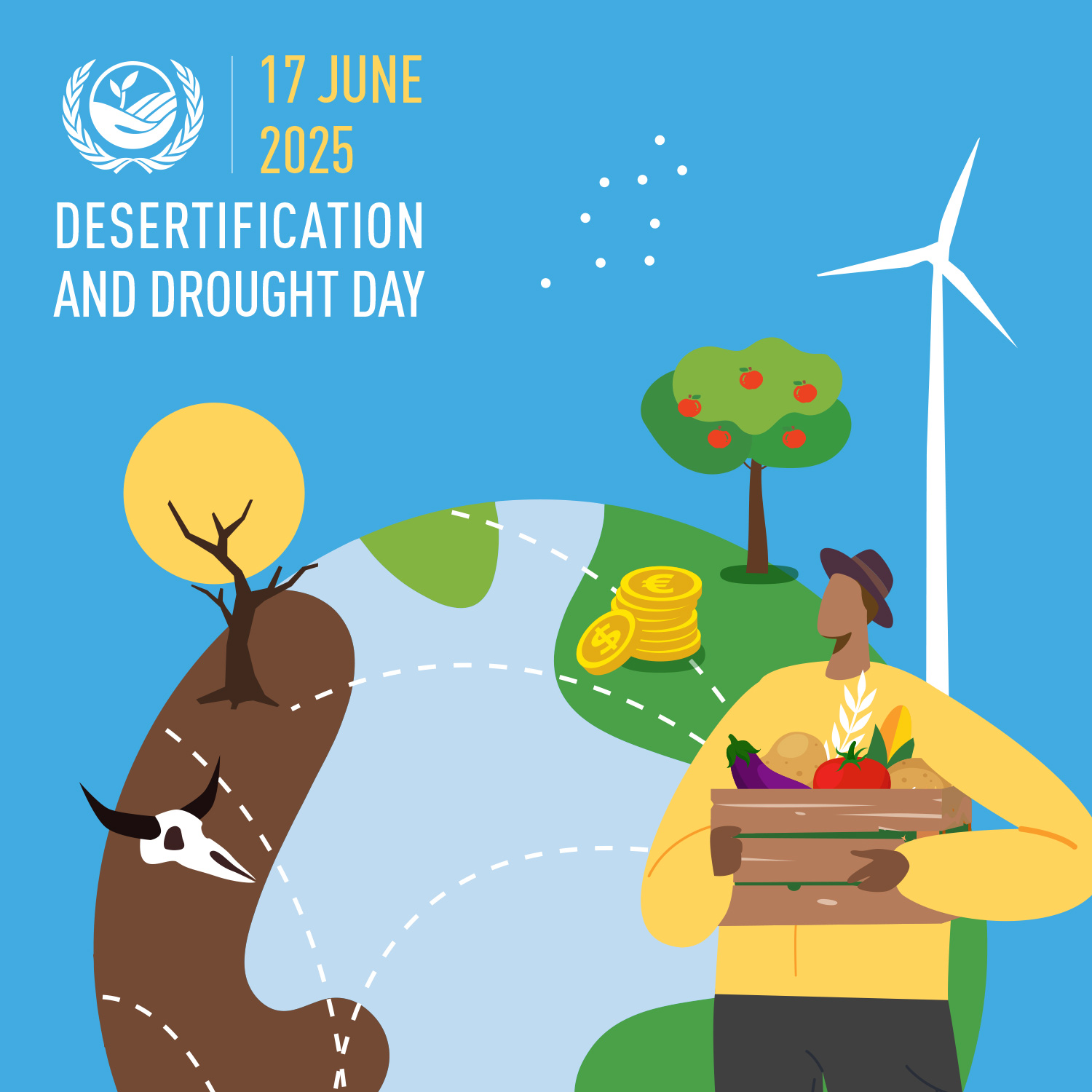
- Also called: DDD
- Observed by: UN Members
- Celebrations: United Nations
- Date: 17 June
- Next time: 17 June 2027
- Frequency: annual

In 1994, the United Nations General Assembly declared a “World Day to Combat Desertification and Drought" (Resolution A/RES/49/115). Since 2019, it has been known simply as Desertification and Drought Day and is observed on 17 June to promote public awareness of international efforts to combat desertification.

Each year, a country is selected to host global celebrations for Desertification and Drought Day. The host country works with the United Nations Convention to Combat Desertification (UNCCD) Secretariat to organize a programme of activities aimed at policymakers, other key stakeholders, and the public at large in support of the Day's objectives. In addition to the main global observance event, countries and communities around the world organize activities to mark Desertification and Drought Day. In 2025, Saudi Arabia used the day's event to highlight their efforts to plant 115 million trees across the country.

Previous global Desertification and Drought Day celebrations have taken place in Colombia (2025), Germany (2024), the USA (2023), Spain (2022), Costa Rica (2021), the Republic of Korea (2020), Türkiye (2019), Ecuador (2018), and Burkina Faso (2017).

== Past editions ==
- 2000: Desertification: A Global Threat
- 2001: 7th World Day to Combat Desertification
- 2002: Land degradation
- 2004: Migration and poverty
- 2005: Women and desertification
- 2006: The beauty of deserts - The challenge of desertification
- 2007: Desertification and climate change - one global challenge
- 2008: Combating land degradation for sustainable agriculture
- 2009: Conserving land and water = Securing our common future
- 2010: Enhancing soils anywhere enhances life everywhere
- 2011: Forests keep drylands working
- 2012: Healthy soil sustains your life: Let's go land degradation neutral
- 2013: Drought and water scarcity
- 2014: Land belongs to the future - Let's climate-proof it!
- 2015: Attainment of food security for all through sustainable food systems: “No such thing as a free lunch. Invest in healthy soils.”
- 2016: Protect Earth. Restore Land. Engage People
- 2017: Our Land. Our Home. Our Future
- 2018: Land has true value – Invest in it!
- 2019: Let's grow the future together
- 2025: Restore the land. Unlock the opportunities
