= ACCF =

ACCF may refer to:

- American Committee for Cultural Freedom, the U.S. affiliate of the Congress for Cultural Freedom
- American College of Cardiology Foundation, a provider of medical education
- American Council for Capital Formation, a pro-business think-tank and lobbying group
- Animal Crossing: City Folk, a game for the Wii
- Assemblée de la Commission communautaire française, the local representative of the French-speaking authorities in the Brussels-Capital Region
- Assembly of Christian Churches in Fiji, an umbrella organization
- Africa Climate Change Fund
