= Talanoa Dialogue =

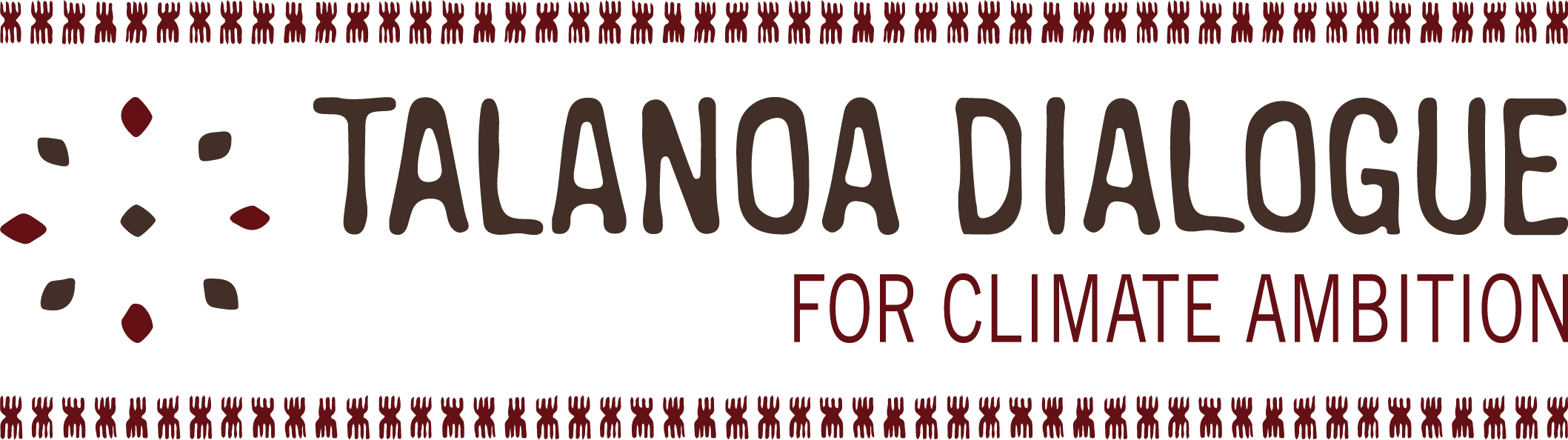
Talanoa Dialogue Logo

The Talanoa Dialogue was a 2017–2018 process within climate change discussions, designed to help countries implement and enhance their Nationally Determined Contributions by 2020. The Dialogue was mandated by the Parties to the United Nations Framework Convention on Climate Change to take stock of the collective global efforts to reduce the emissions of greenhouse gases, in line with the goals of the Paris Agreement, which is to limit the rise in average global temperature to 2°C (3.6°F) above pre-industrial levels, and to pursue efforts to limit the increase to 1.5°C (2.7°F).

The Talanoa Dialogue was launched in 2017 at COP 23 under the presidency of the Republic of Fiji, and was a year-long process that culminated in political discussions at COP 24 in Katowice, Poland, where political leaders were to signal their commitment to increasing the ambition of their NDCs.

The Talanoa Dialogue represented an opening up of the UN Climate Negotiations because non-state actors were able to participate and submit their ideas for how national governments could improve their emission reduction targets.

== Background ==
The Talanoa Dialogue was originally referred to as the facilitative dialogue prior to its official launch at COP23. The Paris Agreement, which was adopted in 2015, provides for progress assessments, often referred to as "stocktakes", every five years to allow Parties to track their progress against the long-term goal of the Paris Agreement, and to help them prepare more ambitious NDCs. The first stocktake under the Paris Agreement took place in 2023 to allow countries to prepare a new round of NDCs by 2025.

However, Parties agreed that it was important to begin this cycle prior to 2020 when the Paris Agreement was expected to come into force, and so they established an initial stock-taking exercise for 2018, which was then known as the "facilitative dialogue", to help prepare updated or new NDCs by 2020.

== Pacific concept of talanoa ==
The Talanoa Dialogue is based on the Pacific concept of "talanoa" (storytelling) that leads to consensus-building and decision-making. The process is designed to allow for participants to share their stories in an open and inclusive environment, devoid of blame, in the hopes that others can learn and benefit from their ideas and experiences. Its use in educational research has been pioneered by academic Seuʻula Johansson-Fua.

== See also ==
- Post–Kyoto Protocol negotiations on greenhouse gas emissions
