= American Council for Capital Formation =

American think tank

- Formation: 1975; 51 years ago
- Founder: Charls Walker
- Founded at: Washington, DC
- Tax ID no.: 52-0991278
- Purpose: capital gains tax reduction
- Headquarters: Washington, D.C.
- President: Mark A. Bloomfield
- Executive Vice President and Chief Economist: Pinar Cebi Wilber
- Website: http://accf.org/

The American Council for Capital Formation (ACCF) is an American think tank founded in 1975 by Charls Walker. It is located on the District of Columbia's Connecticut Avenue. Mark Bloomfeld serves as its president and Pinar Cebi Wilber serves as its executive vice president and chief economist.

The group lobbied for the Revenue Act of 1978, which cut capital gains taxes. The council supports ending the ban on crude oil exports and a flexible approach to the regulation of greenhouse gases. The council describes itself as nonpartisan, while journalists generally describe its positions as "free market" or "pro-business."

== History ==
The council was founded in 1975 as the American Council on Capital Gains and Estate Taxation. Charls Walker founded the council and acted as its first chairman. Seed money for the Council was provided by the Weyerhaeuser Company, a logging concern, and the National Forest Products Association; timber firms were at that time particularly affected by the capital gains tax.

== Issues ==
=== Revenue Act of 1978 ===
In 1978, Democratic President Jimmy Carter announced his intention to pass tax reform legislation. That year, the ACCF set up a meeting between William A. Steiger, a Wisconsin congressman, and Ed Zschau, an electronics entrepreneur from California. Persuaded by Zschau's case that the doubling of capital gains taxes between 1969 and 1976 had badly hurt his industry, Steiger put legislation in motion to reset the tax to 1968 levels. The ACCF spoke in support Steiger's measure.

Carter opposed the measure, but by mid-1978 realized that he lacked the political support to defeat it, given widespread popular anger at high taxes and broad support by both parties. The tax cut bill (the Revenue Act of 1978) passed the House of Representatives by a vote of 362-49 and was signed into law by President Carter.

Analyzing the Revenue Act in his 2008 book The Rise of the Counter-establishment, Democratic activist Sidney Blumenthal was sharply critical of the act, arguing that the bill created no actual growth. Walker argued at the time that the bill had spared the economy from a sharper downturn, and reflected a new bipartisan consensus in favor of capital formation: "'You put the question this way: Do you think that American business is putting enough money into new machinery? And they say no. There it is.'"

=== Crude oil exports ===
The council supported ending the ban on export of crude oil from the United States. Margo Thorning of the ACCF said in response to the refusal of President Barack Obama's administration to lift the ban: "The world has changed tremendously since the ban on crude oil exports was put in place over 40 years ago. That is nowhere more evident than in the transformation of our nation's energy landscape from one of scarcity to one of abundance." The Council hosted two policy briefings on Capitol Hill against the crude oil export ban in 2015 - one in May with Senator John Hoeven and the other in November with Senator Cory Gardner.

=== Climate change ===
The council's position on climate change is that "because energy use and economic growth go hand in hand, policymakers should develop a flexible, long-term approach to reducing the growth of greenhouse gases. This requires a global effort based on technological innovation and technology transfer to developing countries where greenhouse gas emissions growth is most rapid."

While the ACCF is skeptical of climate policies and regulations that impose significant costs on the U.S. economy, the Council does not reject climate-related science. ACCF economist Margo Thorning supported the Energy Tax Prevention Act in 2011 and 2012. This bill would have reversed a Supreme Court ruling that the Environmental Protection Agency has authority to regulate greenhouse gas emissions. In Congressional testimony, Thorning stated that the regulation of greenhouse gases "makes little economic or environmental sense." In 2015, the ACCF joined with an alliance of oil lobbyists and environmental groups to oppose the federal ethanol mandate. In 2017, ACCF’s Vice President of Policy and General Counsel, Timothy M. Doyle released a paper criticizing New York City's decision to divest $5 billion of its pension fund from fossil fuels.

The council also disagrees with policies that would restrict the export of fossil energy. In 2015, Banks wrote, "Some people, particularly environmentalists, will claim that the United States should not export fossil energy because of climate mitigation concerns. While climate change is a problem that the world needs to address, cutting off U.S. exports of fossil fuels is not the answer. In fact, pursuing such an action only reduces the amount of affordable and reliable energy available to global markets for economic development and poverty eradication efforts, increasing the scarcity of energy resources and worsening related competition between nation states."

=== Proxy Advisers ===
In 2018, Timothy M. Doyle, Vice President of Policy and General Counsel of the ACCF, released a report criticizing the growing role of proxy advisers in finance and supporting bipartisan legislation requiring them to register with the Securities and Exchange Commission and disclose conflicts of interest.

== Leadership ==
Charls Walker was the council's first chairman. He served the administration of President Richard M. Nixon as undersecretary of the treasury from 1969 to 1972 and as deputy secretary of the same department in 1973 under John Connally. Walker started consulting after leaving the Nixon administration.

Mark A. Bloomfield is the president and CEO of the council. After working on Ronald Reagan's first presidential campaign, Bloomfield became involved with ACCF after meeting Charls Walker while working as an aide on the House Ways and Means Committee. Walker and Bloomfield later co-authored the book Intellectual Property Rights and Capital Formation in the Next Decade (University Press of America, 1988). Bloomfield is known for the monthly dinners he holds for members of Congress, business leaders, and journalists. Senator Joseph Lieberman called them "Washington's last salon", and Senator John E. Sununu stated that they gave politicians from opposing parties a chance to meet and have "substantive discussions".

Pinar Çebi Wilber is Executive Vice President and Chief Economist with the American Council for Capital Formation. She is also an adjunct professor in the Department of Economics at Georgetown University. Before joining the organization, Wilber was a visiting Assistant Professor at Washington and Lee University. She has a Ph.D. in economics from Georgetown University and a BA from Bilkent University, Turkey. Wilber has conducted research in the areas of energy policy, tax policy, international trade and finance, and general government policy, especially as it relates to the effect of government policies on retirement saving and the use of annuities in retirement.

=== Board of Advisors ===
In 2021, ACCF announced that former Congressman Bill Flores (R-TX) and former Senator Mark Pryor (D-AR) would join its board of directors.

=== Former Staff ===
George "David" Banks served as executive vice president at the ACCF. Before his position at ACCF, Banks was a senior adviser to President George W. Bush on international climate change and then a deputy director of the nuclear energy program at the Center for Strategic & International Studies. In 2017, he served as Special Assistant for International Energy and Environment at the National Economic and National Security Councils in the administration of President Donald Trump.

At ACCF, Banks has been a strong advocate for energy free trade and constructive U.S. engagement with China. "China-bashing in the context of U.S. energy policymaking will only cause Beijing to become more stubborn in the South China Sea and more aggressive in locking up energy supplies around the globe,” he wrote in November 2015. He has also been critical of the Renewable Fuel Standard (RFS), writing in The Washington Times in February 2016 that "The RFS has plagued the country for years by jacking up food and fuel costs. What’s more, it’s outdated and offers zero environmental benefits. Congress should nix this standard before it wreaks more havoc on the country."

In 2018, Banks spoke in support of the Paris climate agreement, calling it "a good Republican agreement".
