= David Banks (climate adviser) =

American political advisor

- Born: Missouri
- Known for: Political advisor to George W. Bush and Donald Trump

George "David" Banks is an American political advisor who served in the administrations of US Presidents George W. Bush and Donald Trump, advising on energy policy and climate change. He was the executive vice president of the American Council for Capital Formation, a pro-business think tank.

== Career ==
Banks was born in Southern Missouri, United States. He received BA degrees in history, economics, and political science and an MA in economics from the University of Missouri at St. Louis. He later graduated with a JD from George Mason University.

Before his position at ACCF, Banks was a senior adviser to President George W. Bush on international climate change. For his work on Montreal Protocol issues in the Bush White House, Banks was honored by the Obama Administration in 2009.

In 2011–2012, he served as Republican deputy staff director of the U.S. Senate Environment and Public Works Committee. He was also a deputy director of the nuclear energy program at the Center for Strategic and International Studies, U.S. State Department diplomat, and CIA analyst.

In 2017, Banks became Special Assistant for International Energy and Environment at the National Economic and National Security Councils in the administration of President Donald Trump, a post he held until February 2018. He resigned after failing to qualify for security clearance due to admitting that he had smoked marijuana in 2013. His departure came during several other departures of Trump administration officials for failing to achieve full security clearances. He then resumed his role with the ACCF.

In April 2018, Banks was named a research fellow at Columbia University, specializing in nuclear power.

== Positions on energy policy ==
Banks has been a strong advocate for energy free trade and constructive U.S. engagement with China. "China-bashing in the context of U.S. energy policymaking will only cause Beijing to become more stubborn in the South China Sea and more aggressive in locking up energy supplies around the globe,” he wrote in November 2015. He was also critical of the Renewable Fuel Standard (RFS), writing in The Washington Times in February 2016 that "The RFS has plagued the country for years by jacking up food and fuel costs. What’s more, it’s outdated and offers zero environmental benefits. Congress should nix this standard before it wreaks more havoc on the country."

In November 2017, Banks attended the 2017 United Nations Climate Change Conference. He has spoken in support of the Paris climate agreement, calling it "a good Republican agreement". He has also spoken in favor of the Kigali Amendment to the Montreal Protocol's potential to create American jobs.
