= Bretton Woods Committee =

American non-profit created in 1983

The Bretton Woods Committee (BWC) is an American non-profit organization which promotes global economic and financial cooperation.

== Origins ==
The BWC was created in 1983 as a result of the agreement between U.S. Secretary of the Treasury, Henry Fowler, and U.S. Deputy Secretary of the Treasury, Charls Walker – at the time a Democrat and a Republican, respectively. The agreement they arrived upon was that world leaders should express to the public the significance of international finance institutions (IFIs), like the Bretton Woods Institutions, and how important it was for their prominence in the world to be maintained. After the 1944 Bretton Woods Conference, the International Monetary Fund and World Bank were established; they are now often referred to as "Bretton Woods Institutions".

The original goal of the committee was to improve the awareness of the World Bank, International Monetary Fund, World Trade Organization, and other major development banks and their actions to accelerate economic growth, lessen poverty, and increase financial stability, along with demonstrating the importance of international economic cooperation and fostering collaboration among institutions.

The BWC is described as being nonpartisan and composed of notable individuals, more specifically members of the committee who agree upon the significance of international economic synergy which in their view results in well-functioning, adept Bretton Woods Institutions that move to create universal economic progress.

== Activities ==
The BWC is based in Washington, D.C., and continues to host events relevant to the shared interests of its members at various academic institutions, the U.S. Department of State, the IMF and related locations pertaining to their goals.

=== Meetings and events ===
The BWC regularly holds events at various locations related to their goals in spreading awareness of major IFIs, including an annual meeting, the International Council Meeting, educational briefings, round table discussions, events at academic institutions and related events. The two purposes of these events is to first reach a general audience regarding the current actions of the IFIs and the magnitude they have on the global economy. The second is to give members an opportunity to share their opinions and critiques of current management of the IFIs. The BWC also informs U.S. government officials of the presumed correlation between global economic advancement and national security.

== Members ==
Membership of the BWC, by invitation only, is composed of financiers, economists, politicians, business leaders and distinguished members of the academic community from the U.S. and abroad. As of 2024, the organization had 448 members (including 140 from outside the United States). Because individual memberships are not transferable and retained in the event of retirement or change of affiliation, the committee also offers organizational membership to allow varied individuals to represent corporate bodies and other groups. As of 2024, there were 61 organizational members.

A subsidiary of the committee, referred to as the International Council, includes members outside of the U.S. who aim to advance and observe the work of Bretton Woods institutions and political officials of countries that council members are from/involved in, and in addition submit advice when appropriate.

Some of the current leadership/members of the BWC include:

- William C. Dudley, chair
- John Lipsky, vice-chair
- William R. Rhodes, vice-chair
- George H. W. Bush, Jimmy Carter and Gerald Ford, honorary co-chairs
- Bill Frenzel, co-chair
- James Wolfensohn, co-chair
- Richard A. Debs, executive committee chair
- James C. Orr, secretary
- David Miliband
- Colin Powell
- Paul Volcker
