= African Development Bank =

Multilateral development finance institution

- Banque africaine de développement

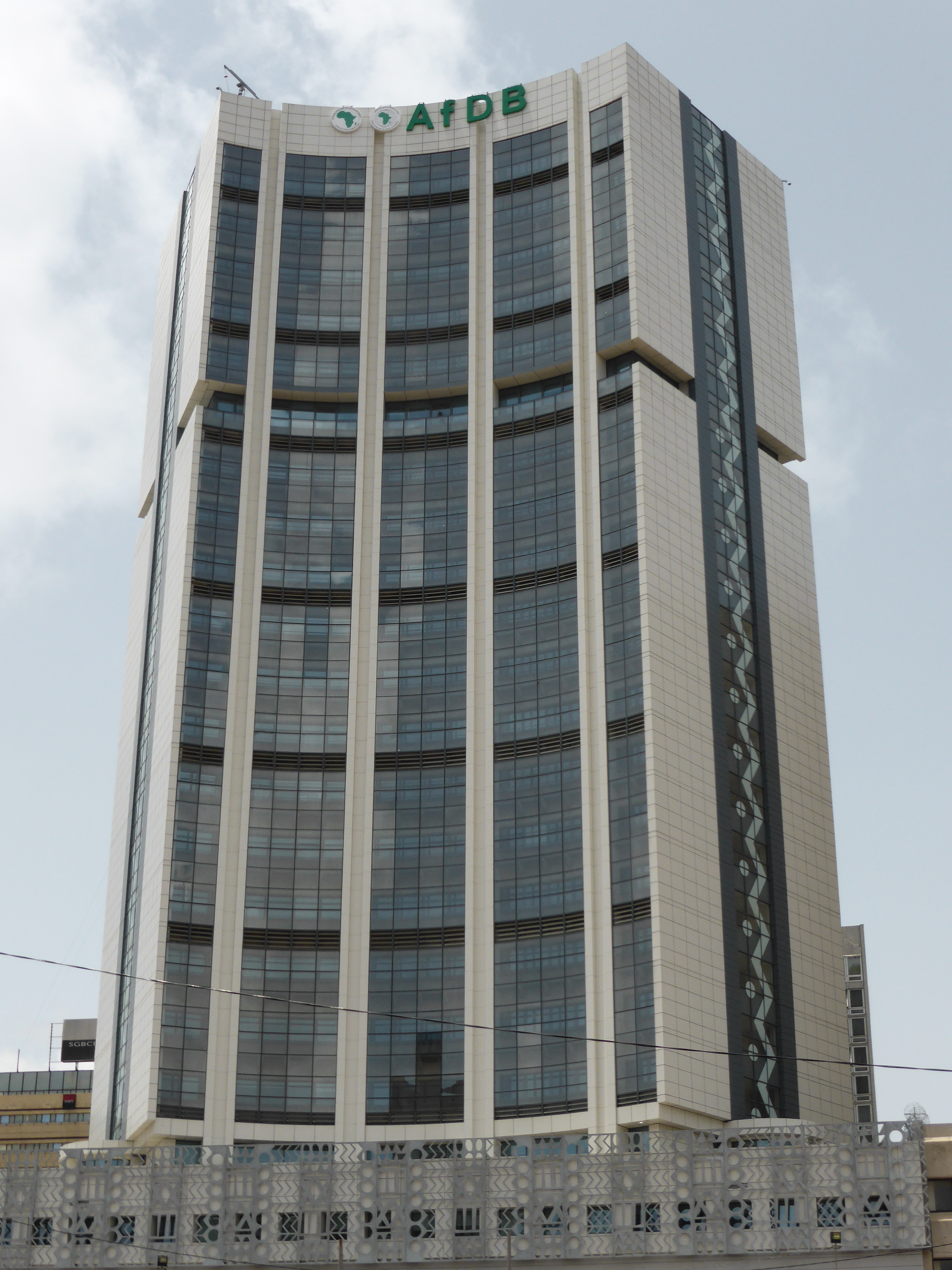
- AfDB headquarters building in Abidjan
- Abbreviation: AfDB
- Formation: September 10, 1964; 62 years ago
- Type: International organization
- Legal status: Treaty
- Purpose: Regional development
- Headquarters: Abidjan, Ivory Coast
- Members: 81 countries
- President: Sidi Ould Tah
- Main organ: Board of Executive Directors
- Staff: 2,123 as of 31 December 2022
- Website: www.afdb.org

The African Development Bank Group (AfDB, also known as BAD in French) is a multilateral development finance institution, headquartered in Abidjan, Ivory Coast, since September 2014. The AfDB is a financial provider to African governments and private companies investing in the regional member countries (RMC).

The AfDB was founded in 1964 by the Organisation of African Unity, which is the predecessor of the African Union.

The AfDB comprises three entities: The African Development Bank, the African Development Fund and the Nigeria Trust Fund.

== History ==
Following the end of the colonial period in Africa, a growing desire for more unity within the continent led to the establishment of two draft charters: one for the establishment of the Organization of African Unity (established in 1963, later replaced by the African Union) and one for a regional development bank.

A draft accord was submitted to top African officials and then to the Conference of Finance Ministers on the Establishment of an African Development Bank. This conference was convened by the United Nations Economic Commission for Africa (UNECA) in Khartoum, Sudan, from July 31 to August 4. It was here that the agreement establishing the African Development Bank (AfDB) was cosigned by 23 African governments on August 4, 1963. The agreement came into force on September 10, 1964.

The inaugural meeting of the Board of Governors of the bank was held from 4 to 7 November 1964 in Lagos, Nigeria. The bank's headquarters opened in Abidjan, Ivory Coast, in March 1965 and the bank's operations commenced on 1 July 1966.

Originally, only African countries were able to join the bank, but in 1982, it began allowing the entry of non-African countries as well. According to the AfDB, the inclusion of non-regional members helped contribute to economic and social development through low-interest loans, additional banking expertise and access to markets outside of the region.

From February 2003 to September 2014, the bank operated from its Temporary Relocation Agency in Tunis, Tunisia, owing to the prevailing political conflict in Ivory Coast during the Ivorian civil war at the time. The bank was able to return to its original headquarters in Abidjan in late 2013 once the political crisis was over.

By June 2015, over 1,500 staff had returned to the bank's Abidjan headquarters out of the more than 1,900 total staff the bank.

Since its founding, AfDB has financed 2,885 operations, for a total of $47.5 billion. In 2003, it received an AAA rating from the major financial rating agencies and had a capital of $32.043 billion. In November 2019, the bank's capital was reported as $208 billion.

In the African Development Bank's 2022 Annual Report, a decrease in Africa's GDP growth to 3.8%, down from 4.8% the previous year, was recorded. The 16th replenishment of the African Development Fund (ADF-16), which provides soft loans and grants, served as a significant financial enhancement, gathering US$8.9 billion. Within this sum, US$429 million was designated specifically for climate change-related initiatives. The Bank's project approval amounts reached UA 6.16 billion, which is close to the pre-COVID-19 pandemic benchmark of UA 7.3 billion from 2019. The High 5 strategic priority areas saw robust increases in funding, with renewable energy projects receiving notable emphasis as they accounted for 100% of the approvals for energy generation projects. Investment in other key areas also increased, with food security receiving UA 1.34 billion, industrialization UA 1.59 billion, and infrastructure UA 1.13 billion. The Bank's active portfolio grew to UA 44.33 billion, with 58% of projects rated satisfactorily. Disbursements for the year totaled UA 3.5 billion, and the Bank maintained its AAA credit rating.

Also in 2022 the AfDB signed a cooperative strategic partnership agreement with the Caribbean Development Bank (CDB).

== Group entities ==
The African Development Bank Group has two other entities: the African Development Fund (ADF) and the Nigeria Trust Fund (NTF).

=== African Development Fund ===
Established in 1972, the African Development Fund started operations in 1974. It provides development finance on concessional terms to low-income RMCs which are unable to borrow on the non-concessional terms of the AfDB. In harmony with its lending strategy, poverty reduction is the main aim of ADF activities. Twenty-four non-African countries along with the AfDB constitute its current membership. The largest ADF shareholder is the United Kingdom, with approximately 14 percent of the total working shares followed by United States with approximately 6.5 percent of the total voting shares, followed by Japan with approximately 5.4 percent. The Federal Reserve Bank of New York was designated as the depositor bank for the fund according to telegraphs sent from the U.S. Embassy in Abidjan in 1976.

The ADF's general operations are decided by a Board of Directors, six of which are appointed by the non-African member states and six designated by the AfDB from among the bank's regional Executive Directors.

The ADF's sources are mainly contributions and periodic replacements by non-African member states. The fund is usually replenished every three years, unless member states decide otherwise. The total donations, at the end of 1996, amounted to $12.58 billion. The ADF lends at no interest rate, with an annual service charge of 0.75 percent, a commitment fee of 0.5 percent, and a 50-year repayment period including a 10-year grace period. The tenth United Kingdom replenishment of the ADF was in 2006.

=== Nigeria Trust Fund ===
The Nigeria Trust Fund (NTF) was established in 1976 by the Nigerian government with an initial capital of $80 million. The NTF is aimed at assisting in the development efforts of the poorest AfDB members.

The NTF uses its resources to provide financing for projects of national or regional importance which further the economic and social development of the low-income RMCs whose economic and social conditions require financing on non-conventional terms. In 1996, the NTF had a total resource base of $432 million. It lends at a 4 percent interest rate with a 25-year repayment period, including a five-year grace period. The loans can be used for concessional loan operations with long and short term maturity.

== Management and control ==
The AfDB is controlled by a Board of Executive Directors, made up of representatives of its member countries. The voting power on the Board is split according to the size of each member's share, currently 60%-40% between African (or "regional") countries and “non-regional” member countries (“donors”). The largest African Development Bank shareholder is Nigeria with nearly 9% of the vote. All member countries of the AfDB are represented on the AfDB Board of Executive Directors.

In May 2026, Sidi Ould Tah was elected the 9th President of the Group. Previously, he served as the head of the Arab Bank for Economic Development in Africa.

Member governments are officially represented at the AfDB by their Minister of Finance, Planning or Cooperation who sits on the AfDB Board of Governors. The AfDB Governors meet once a year (at the Annual Meetings of the AfDB each May) to take major decisions about the institution's leadership, strategic directions and governing bodies. The Governors typically appoint a representative from their country to serve in the offices of the AfDB's Board of Executive Directors.

Day-to-day decisions about which loans and grants should be approved and what policies should guide the AfDB's work are taken by the Board of Executive Directors. Each member country is represented on the Board, but their voting power and influence differs depending on the amount of money they contribute to the AfDB.

In June 2020, the board of the AfDB agreed to a review of Adesina's management of the bank. Adesina was reelected unanimously for a second five-year term on 27 August 2020.

== Unit of Account ==
ADB Unit of Account
ISO 4217
- Code: XUA (numeric: 965)

Demographics
- User(s): African Development Bank Group (African Development Bank, African Development Fund, Nigeria Trust Fund)

The African Development Bank uses a Unit of Account which is registered as ISO 4217, whose standard currency code is XUA. It is not exchanged directly by individuals, but rather only for accounting purposes between state members.

== Mission ==
The AfDB's mission is to fight poverty and improve living conditions on the continent through promoting the investment of public and private capital in projects and programs that are likely to contribute to the economic and social development of the region.

The AfDB has also supported initiatives to address climate change in sub-Saharan Africa. It has been criticized by environmental and animal welfare activists for continuing to finance greenhouse gas intensive industrial animal agriculture operations despite promising to align its activities with the Paris Agreement.

== Functions ==
The primary function of AfDB is making loans and equity investments for the socio-economic advancement of the RMC. Second, the bank provides technical assistance for development projects and programs. Third, it promotes investment of public and private capital for development. Fourth, the bank assists in organizing the development policies of RMCs.

The AfDB is also required to give special attention to national and multinational projects which are needed to promote regional integration.

== Status ==
The AfDB promotes economic development and social progress of its RMCs in Africa and the bank commits approximately $3 billion annually to African countries. Its relatively small lending and tendency to follow in the footsteps of more prominent public institutions like the World Bank, implies that the African Development Bank has been receiving little interest from civil society organizations as well as academia.

AfDB emphasizes the role of women along with education reforms, and lent its support to key initiatives such as debt alleviation for Heavily Indebted Poor Countries and the New Partnership for Africa's Development (NEPAD).

The bank is currently based in Abidjan, Ivory Coast again. It employs approximately 1,865 employees as of 2016, and has 80 members: 54 countries in Africa and 26 American, European, and Asian countries.

== Recent trends and directions ==
One of emerging views, repeatedly cited by the AfDB's board of directors and management, is that the AfDB should be more “selective” and “country-focused” in its operations. Though this policy has still to be clearly defined, it appears to be driving certain lending priorities.

The infrastructure sector, including power supply, water and sanitation, transport and communications, has traditionally received the largest share of AfDB lending. This focus was re-affirmed in the AfDB's 2003-2007 Strategic Plan, which identified infrastructure as a priority area for AfDB lending.

In 2005, the AfDB approved 23 infrastructure projects for approximately $982 million, which totaled 40% of AfDB approvals that year. Given the increased attention to infrastructure development in Africa from donors and borrowers, it is likely that AfDB's infrastructure lending will increase significantly in the coming years. In 2007, infrastructure operations accounted for approximately 60 percent of the bank's portfolio.

Regional integration infrastructure projects will be a key part of the AfDB's future business. According to the AfDB's 2005 Annual Report, regional economic blocs will make Africa “more competitive in the global market”, while transport and power interconnections between smaller African economies will help create larger markets in the continent. The AfDB's member countries claim that AfDB, as a multilateral institution, is particularly suited to support regional integration projects.

The AfDB has been designated the lead agency to facilitate "NEPAD infrastructure initiatives", which are regional integration projects led by African Regional Economic Communities (RECs). Additionally, the AfDB hosts the Infrastructure Consortium for Africa (ICA). The ICA was established by G8 countries to coordinate and encourage infrastructure development in Africa, focusing on regional infrastructure development in particular. The AfDB helps to prepare projects so they may obtain financing from others sources through an initiative called the Infrastructure Project Preparation Facility (IPPF). So even if the AfDB is not directly involved in financing a particular infrastructure project, it may have helped to make it possible.

Another key area of concentration of the AfDB's support of RMCs is the fight against HIV/AIDS.

The AfDB has five policies towards securing Africa's future through health funding:

- Institutional capacity building through assistance of policy/strategy formulation and implementation
- Human capital development to create an environment for the operation of national AIDS strategies through training and technical assistance support
- HIV/AIDS multi-sectoral responses with emphasis on prevention and control interventions that include IEC (Information, Education and Communication), STI (sexually transmitted infections) control, VCT (voluntary counselling and testing), infrastructure support for the establishment of laboratories and blood transfusion facilities, and provision of equipment and supplies, including antiretroviral drugs
- Advocacy through participation in international and regional forums to raise political commitment and leadership towards a collaborative effort in the fight against the pandemic among RMCs and development partners
- Partnership development with a view of forging new alliances and revitalizing existing collaboration to cover critical development concerns such as HIV/AIDS and to bringing partnership activities within the framework of the bank's vision

The bank's contribution in the fight against HIV/AIDS is estimated at over UA 500 million. The bank is among the initiating partners of "AIDS in Africa – Scenarios for the future," a project whose outcome will enable governments and development partners alike to make strategic choices of current and future development paths and define their activities accordingly in order to face the challenges posed by HIV/AIDS.

Energy projects are likely to become a more important area of the AfDB's infrastructure work, given the lack of access to energy services across Africa and continued high oil prices affecting oil-importing countries. It is not clear if the AfDB's role in the energy sector will prioritize energy projects for domestic consumption or for export, although the AfDB has supported both in the past. The AfDB is currently drafting an energy policy and developing its contribution to the G8-mandated Clean Energy Investment Framework.

Although there is no official statement or consensus to this effect, AfDB lending for agriculture, (non-infrastructure) rural development and social sectors, such as health and education, is reportedly likely to decrease over the coming years.

In 2010, the African Development Institute became the focal point of the African Development Bank Group for capacity-building. The institute had been established in 1973 to enhance the effectiveness of the AfDB's funded operations. Its mandate was reoriented in 1992 and it was restructured in 2001.

In response to the global coronavirus pandemic, the AfDB has increasingly focused on selling social bonds as a means to raise funds for poor countries to deal with the pandemic. Since the pandemic, it has issued four bonds, for a total of seven since 2017.

In 2023, the African Development Bank Group launched country-by-country economic reports to guide African policymakers in their discussions about climate resilience and green growth policies.

In February 2025, the AfDB and Interpol signed a letter of intent to pursue greater cooperation to combat corruption across the continent. According to AfDB president Akinwumi Adesina, the partnership is expected to "help African countries build robust systems against money laundering and financial crime.”

== Prospects ==
The AfDB's financial standing has been restored from the near collapse of 1995, but its operational credibility remains a work-in-progress. A working group convened by the Center for Global Development, an independent Washington think tank, released a report in September 2006 that offered six recommendations for Bank's president and board of directors on broad principles to guide the bank's renewal. The report contains six recommendations for management and shareholders as they address the urgent task of reforming Africa's development bank. Prominent among the recommendations is a strong focus on infrastructure.

While the AfDB's lending had not expanded significantly in recent years, 2006 figures indicate that things may be changing. Between 2005 and 2006, the AfDB's lending activities increased by more than 30 percent to $3.4 billion. Over the same period, private sector operations doubled in value. The AfDB has specific mandates from the New Partnership for Africa's Development (NEPAD) and other international organizations to take the lead amongst financial and development institutions in areas such as infrastructure, regional integration, and banking and financial standards in Africa. These mandates have also increased the AfDB's profile in the media. The increased international emphasis on Africa's development needs in recent years (for example, surrounding the 2005 Gleneagles G8 Summit), and on the importance of infrastructure investment in Africa, has highlighted the role of the AfDB.

Some research has indicated that a high percentage of respondents in African countries has a marked preference for additional aid from the African Development Bank, despite the fact its relatively low rating against most of the aid effectiveness criteria found to be important by donor recipients. This suggests that donor recipients in Africa views on the ‘multilateral donor of choice’ are informed by additional aid effectiveness criteria that are not commonly identified or reported against, though exactly what those criteria have not been discussed.

In general, whereas there has been progress at all levels with regard to democracy, growth and restoring the macro-economic balances in Africa over the past fifteen years, half of sub-Saharan Africa lives on under one dollar a day, and AIDS is threatening the social fabric of the continent. The studies conducted by various organizations (including the African Development Bank and the World Bank) show that, with the exception of northern and southern Africa, the United Nations Millennium Development Goals (reducing by half the number of persons living in poverty and without access to potable water by 2015) will in most cases not be attained. Nevertheless, these same studies indicate that the majority of the African countries can make notable progress to these ends.

== African Development Bank annual conferences ==
African Development Bank's (AfDB) 4th annual conference outside Africa held in India (Gandhinagar, Gujarat) on May 22–26, 2017, at an event inaugurated by India's Prime Minister Narendra Modi. Previous conferences outside Africa were in Spain, China, Portugal.

== Membership ==
Regional member countries Non-regional member countries Non-regional member countries - ADF only

Countries eligible for... ADF resources only a blend of ADB and ADF resources ADB resources only

=== Regional member countries ===
Note: All countries in the African Union including Mauritania but excluding the SADR are eligible for NTF benefits.

==== ADF eligibility ====
- Benin
- Burkina Faso
- Burundi
- Central African Republic
- Chad
- Comoros
- DR Congo
- Djibouti
- Eritrea
- Ethiopia
- Gambia
- Guinea-Bissau
- Guinea
- Lesotho
- Liberia
- Madagascar
- Malawi
- Mali
- Mauritania
- Mozambique
- Mexico
- Rwanda
- Sierra Leone
- Somalia
- South Sudan
- Sudan
- São Tomé and Príncipe
- Tanzania
- Togo
- Uganda
- Zimbabwe

==== ADB and ADF eligibility ====
- Cameroon
- Ivory Coast
- Kenya
- Senegal
- Zambia

==== ADB eligibility ====
- Algeria
- Angola
- Botswana
- Cape Verde
- Egypt
- Equatorial Guinea
- Eswatini
- Gabon
- Libya
- Mauritius
- Morocco
- Namibia
- Nigeria
- Congo
- Seychelles
- South Africa
- Tunisia

=== Non-regional member countries ===
- Argentina
- Austria
- Belgium
- Brazil
- Canada
- China
- Denmark
- Finland
- France
- Germany
- India
- Ireland
- Italy
- Japan
- Kuwait
- Luxembourg
- Netherlands
- Norway
- Portugal
- Saudi Arabia
- South Korea
- Spain
- Sweden
- Switzerland
- Turkey
- United Arab Emirates (Note: ADF only)
- United Kingdom
- United States

== Regional offices ==
Region	Headquarters
Central Africa	(Cameroon) Yaoundé
East Africa	(Kenya) Nairobi
North Africa	(Tunisia) Tunis
Southern Africa	(South Africa) Pretoria
West Africa	(Ivory Coast) Abidjan

== List of 20 largest countries by voting powers ==
The following table are amounts for the 20 largest countries by voting powers at the African Development Bank as of September 2021.

The 20 largest countries by voting powers at the African Development Bank
Rank	Country	Voting powers (% of total)
	World	100.000
1	Nigeria	10.077
2	United States	7.581
3	Japan	6.284
4	South Africa	5.863
5	Algeria	5.758
6	Germany	4.779
7	Canada	4.395
8	Morocco	4.386
9	France	4.299
10	Egypt	3.062
11	Italy	2.780
12	Libya	2.749
13	Ghana	2.552
14	United Kingdom	2.083
15	Ivory Coast	1.988
16	Sweden	1.802
17	Switzerland	1.683
18	Kenya	1.660
19	China	1.389
20	Denmark	1.351

== United Nations Development Business ==
The United Nations launched Development Business in 1978 with the support of the World Bank and many other major development banks from around the world. Today, Development Business is the primary publication for all major multilateral development banks including the African Development Bank, United Nations agencies, and several national governments, many of whom have made the publication of their tenders and contracts in Development Business mandatory.

== See also ==
- African Economic Outlook is published annually by the OECD Development Centre and the African Development Bank.
- African, Caribbean and Pacific Group of States
- Asian Development Bank
- Asian Infrastructure Investment Bank
- European Investment Bank
- Caribbean Development Bank
- CAF – Development Bank of Latin America and the Caribbean
- Islamic Development Bank
- Inter-American Development Bank
- New Development Bank
