= International Congress Centre in Katowice =

Congress and Conference Centre in Katowice, Poland

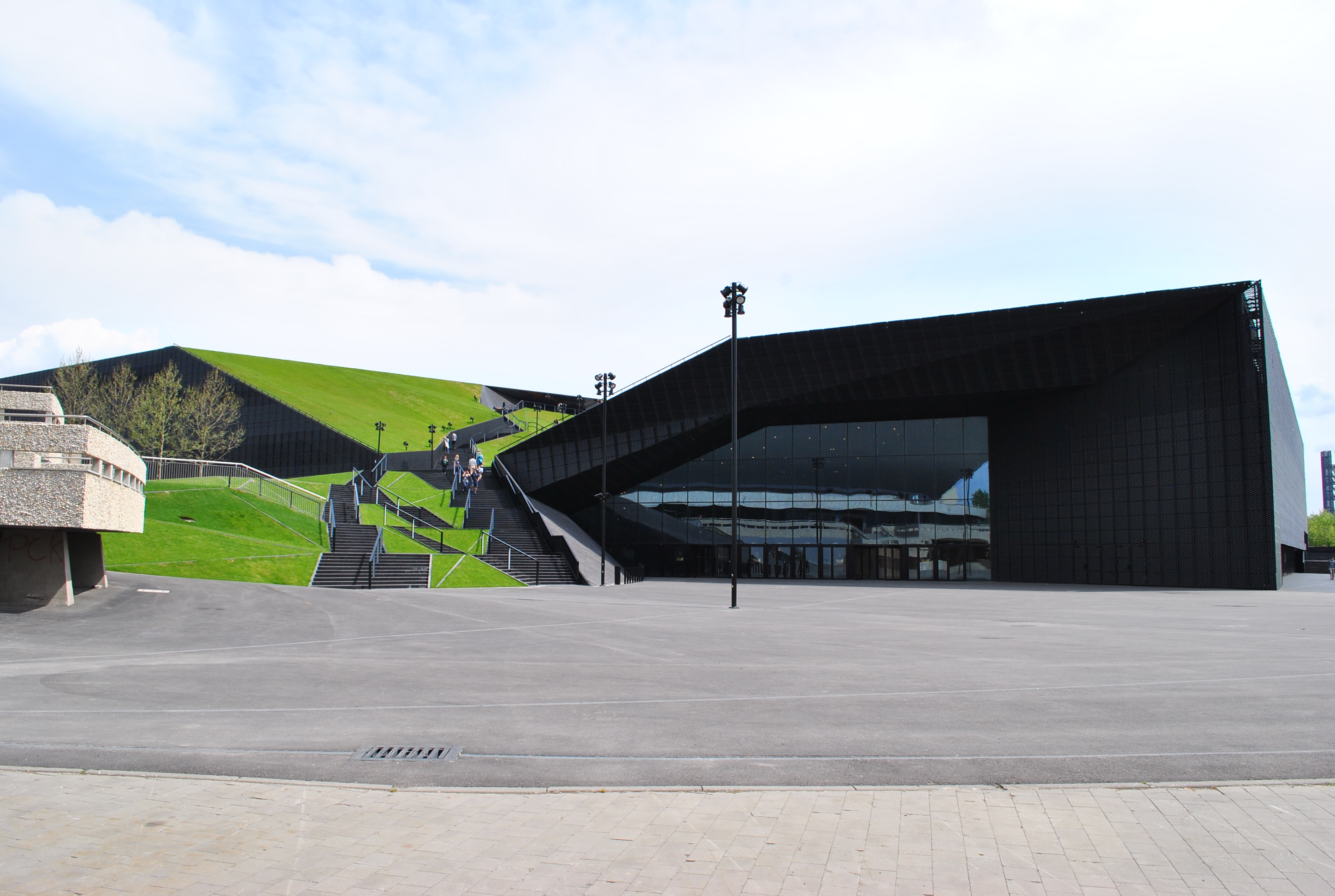
- ICC in 2015
- Interactive map of International Congress Centre in Katowice
- Address: Plac Sławika i Antalla 1, 40–163 Katowice
- Location: Katowice, Poland
- Coordinates: 50°15′55″N 19°01′38″E
- Owner: City of Katowice
- Operator: PTWP Event Center sp. z o.o.
- Capacity: 12,000–15,000
- Record attendance: 25 000 (2018 United Nations Climate Change Conference)
- Public transit: Katowice Spodek; Katowice Rondo

Construction
- Opened: 2015; 11 years ago
- Architect: JEMS Architekci

Website
- www.mckkatowice.pl/en/

International Congress Centre in Katowice (ICC) (pol. Międzynarodowe Centrum Kongresowe w Katowicach, MCK) is a multipurpose conference and convention centre. It was opened to the public in 2015. It is owned by City of Katowice, Poland and since May 2016 is managed by the PTWP Event Center sp. z o.o. on a multi-year lease from the city.

== History, design and construction ==
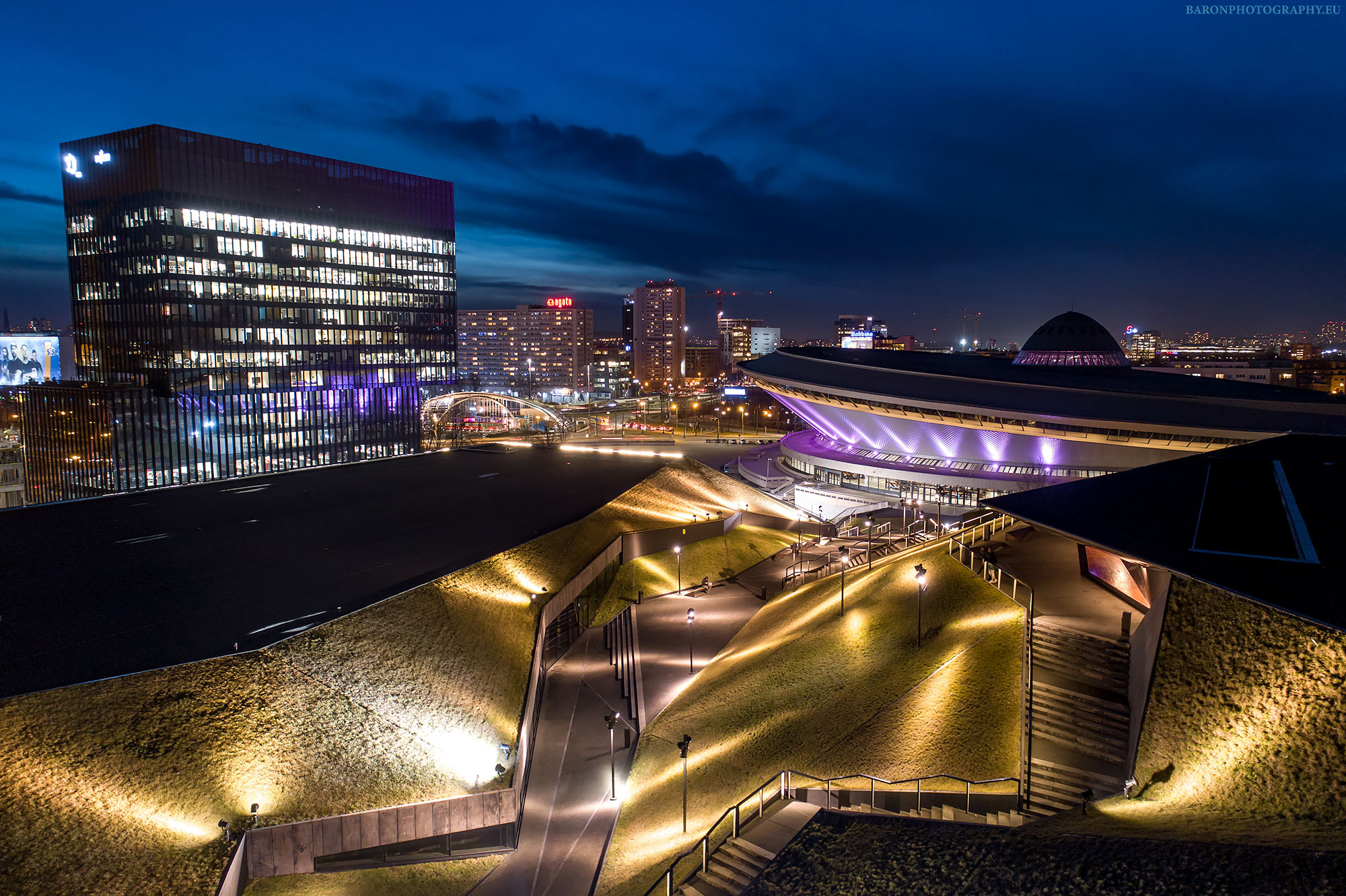
MCK and Spodek at night, 2020

Katowice, for most of it modern history, has been a coal mining town and the heart of Poland's industrial region, Silesia. Together with nearby Spodek, the Silesian Museum, and the Polish National Radio Symphony Orchestra building, the International Congress Centre is built on a post-industrial area of an old Katowice Coal Mine, which was operational until the late 1990s. The venue stands on an old mining waste dump site classified as "2A".

In 2011 the City of Katowice started construction of the venue, with a total cost of 378 mln PLN (with 182 mln PLN coming from the EU budget). The venue was designed by JEMS Architekci and the contract for construction was awarded to the Polimex–Mostostal joint venture. After the contract with Polimex-Mostostal was voided by the city, Warbud and the Mercury Engineering consortium was awarded the construction contract. The design of the centre, with a distinct canyon going through it to remove any obstruction from the view of Spodek, has been praised, and the building was nominated for the Mies van der Rohe award in 2017. The venue is connected directly to Spodek by an underground tunnel.

Construction of the venue ended in March 2015, a year later than planned. On 12–15 March, ICC held its first event, the Intel ESL Expo Katowice.

== Capacity ==
International Congress Centre in Katowice is divided in 4 parts:

1. Multi-function room with an area of 8174 m^{2} (up to 10.000 people), with a possibility to divide the room into three parts with area ranging from 2583 m^{2} to 2839 m^{2};
2. Auditorium (up to 600 people) – Separated from the rest, with its own foyer, checkrooms and restrooms. It provides full separation of participants from other events going on at the same time at the ICC;
3. Ball rooms (up to 1000 people) – In a separate part of the building, with a separate foyer and toilets. It is possible to divide it into three independent modules A, B and C;
4. Conference Centre – smaller and medium-sized conference rooms on the uppermost level (26 meeting rooms ranging from 38 to 144 m^{2}, with the possibility of combining and separating meeting rooms).

The venue has a parking capacity of 1500 cars and buses.

Together with Spodek, ICC can host events for up to 25,000 attendees.

== Culture Zone of Katowice ==
The City of Katowice has established a Culture Zone (pol. Strefa Kultury) around the newly redeveloped part of the city. The total cost of the zone's urban renewal exceeded 1 billion PLN. The zone has received various awards, including MP Power Multi Venue 2018, REAL ESTATE IMPACTOR 2018, Meeting Planner Power Awards 2016 and the Best Tourist Product of the Year 2015 in a competition by the Polish Tourist Organization.

Buildings in the Katowice Culture Zone
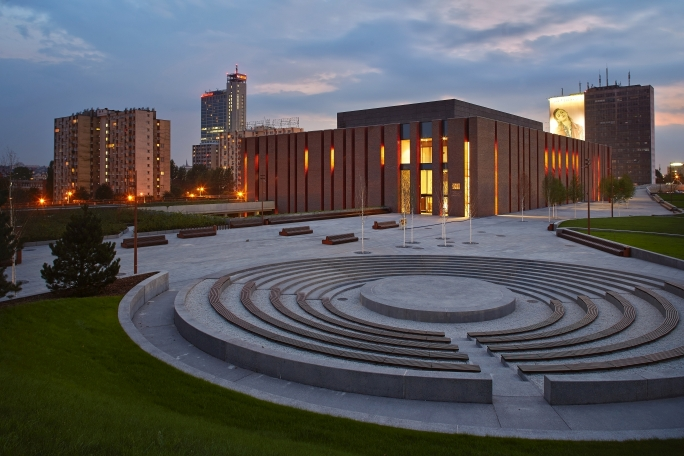
Polish National Radio Symphony Orchestra building

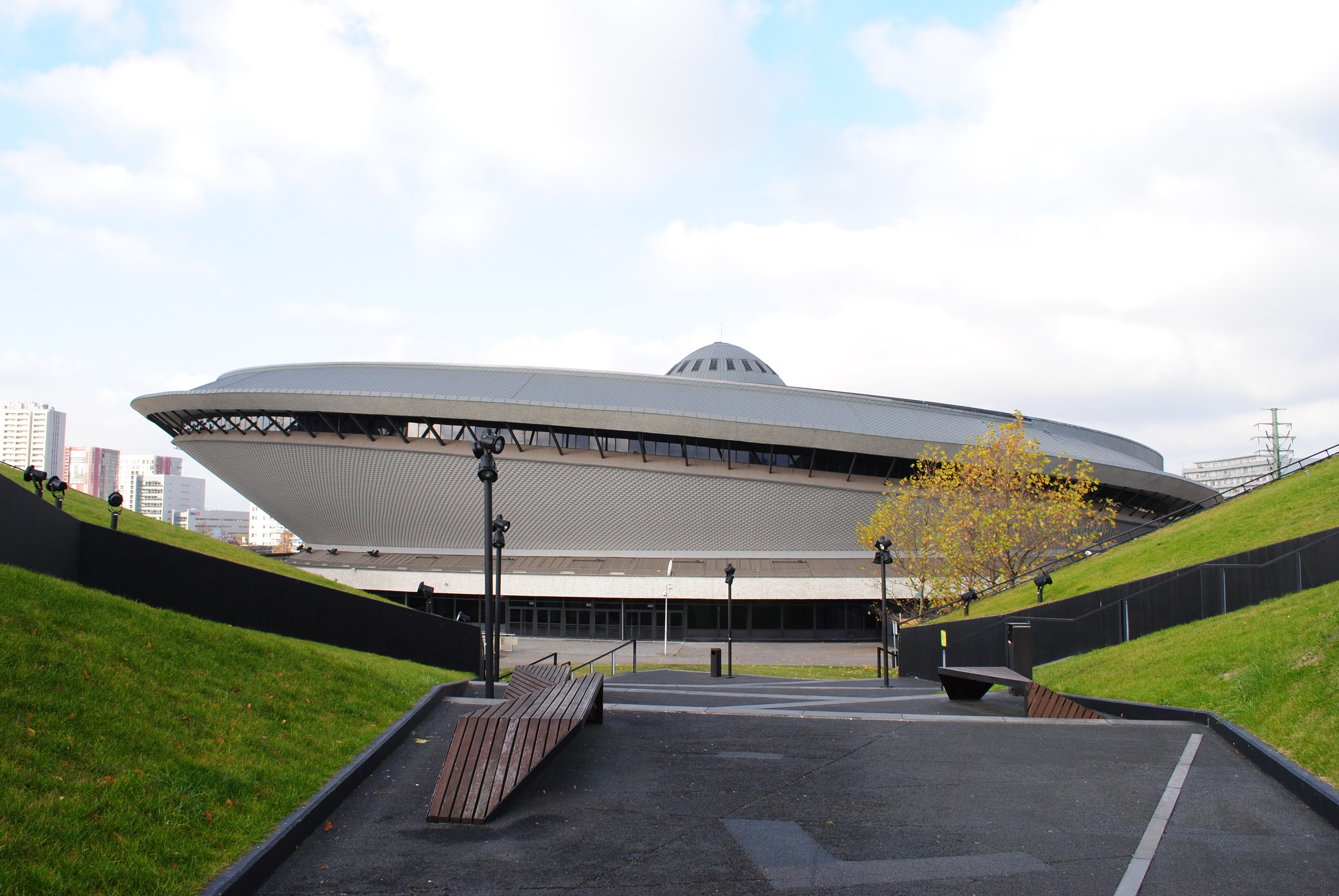
Spodek seen from ICC

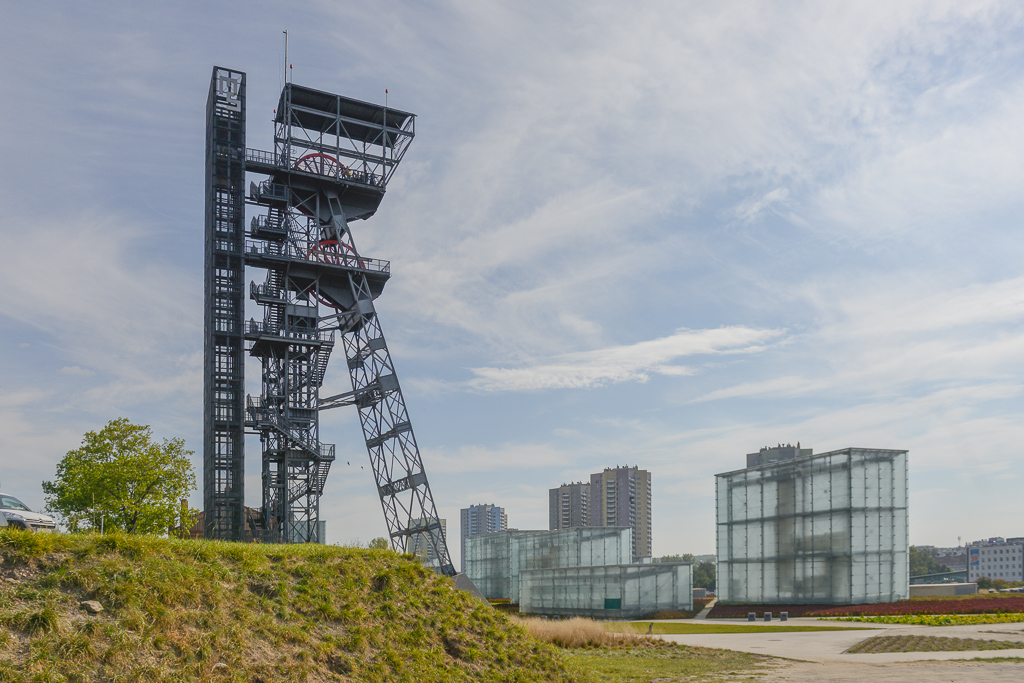
Entrance to the Silesian Museum

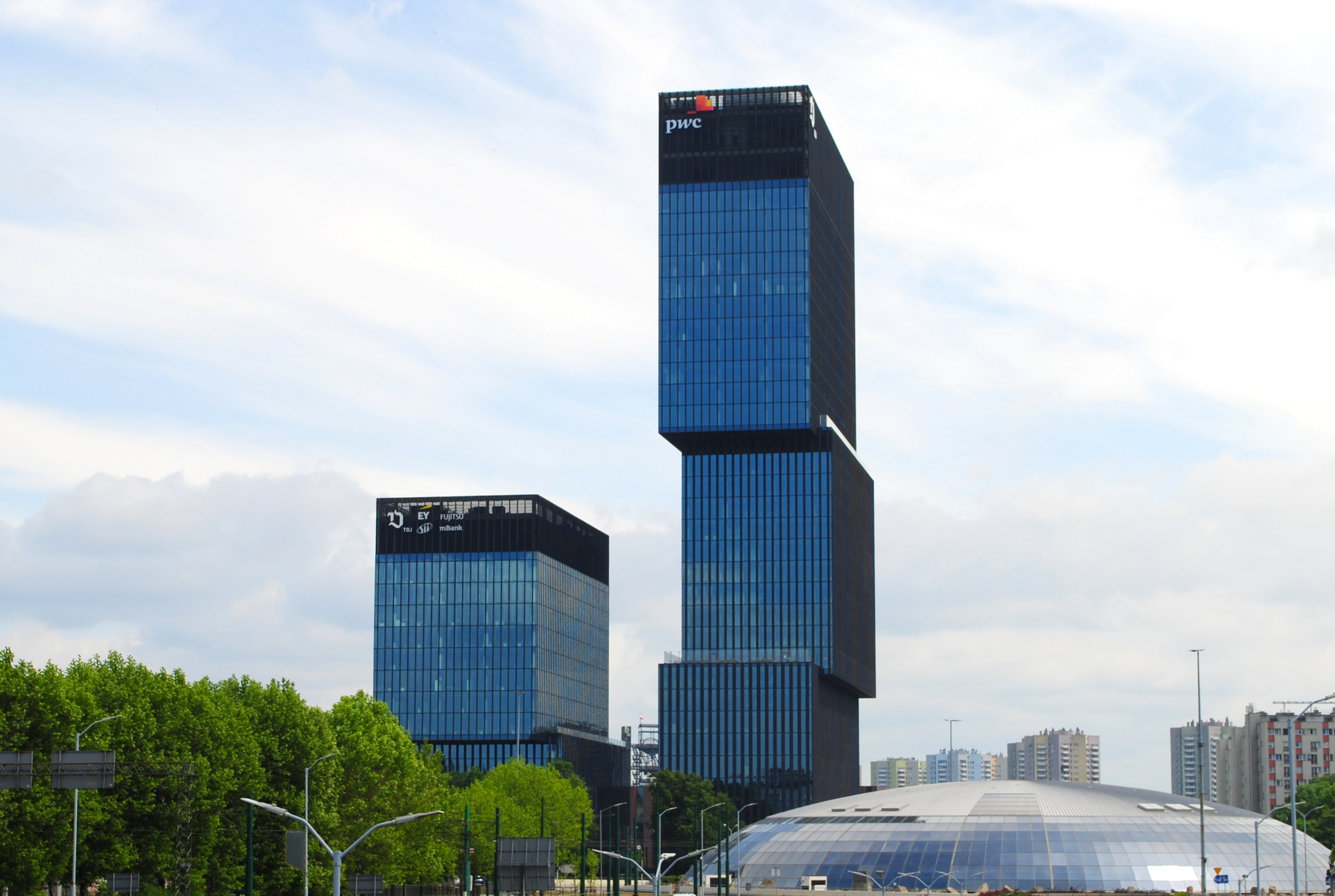
KTW skyscrapers

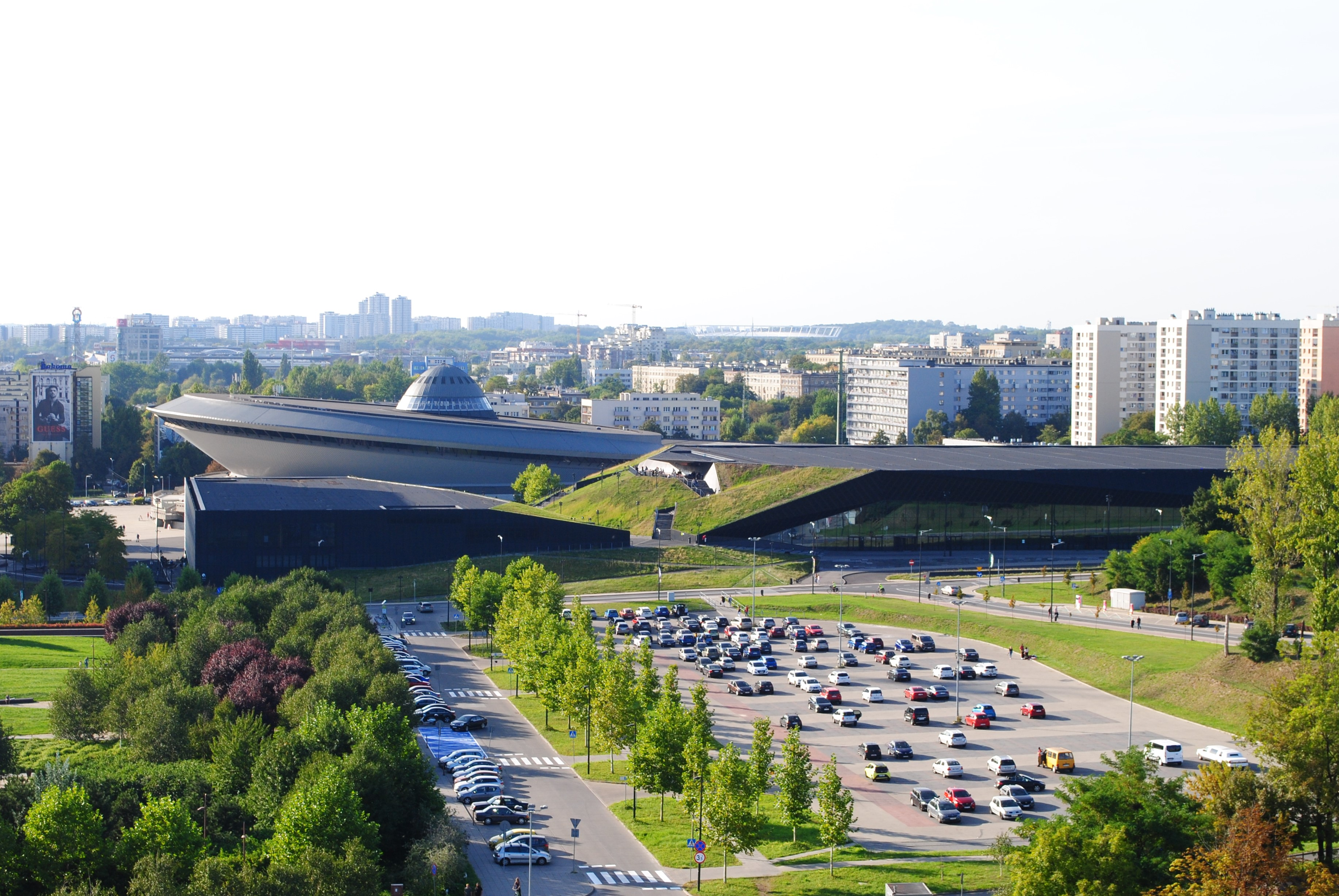
Spodek and the ICC as seen from the Silesian Museum

== Hosted events ==
Among the events hosted in the venue were:

- European Economic Congress
- 2018 United Nations Climate Change Conference
- Intel Extreme Masters Finals (2015–2018 and 2022–2024)
- Wikimania 2024, the 19th annual gathering of the Wikimedia movement, took place at this venue from 7 to 10 August 2024.
