= 2017 United Nations Climate Change Conference =

International climate change conference in Germany

COP23 FIJI, United Nations Climate Change Conference 2017
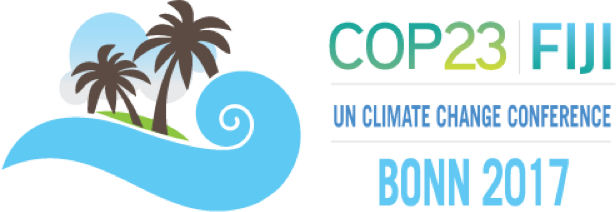
- Native name: UN-Klimakonferenz in Bonn 2017
- Date: 6 November 2017– 17 November 2017
- Location: Bonn, Germany
- Also known as: COP23 (UNFCCC); CMP13 (Kyoto Protocol); CMA1-2 or 1.2 (Paris Agreement)
- Organized by: Republic of Fiji, Presidency of COP23 (organised in Germany for practical reasons)
- Participants: Parties to the UNFCCC in the Bula Zone and Non-Party Stakeholders in the Bonn Zone
- Previous event: ← Marrakech 2016
- Next event: Katowice 2018 →
- Website: cop23.com.fjcop23.unfccc.int

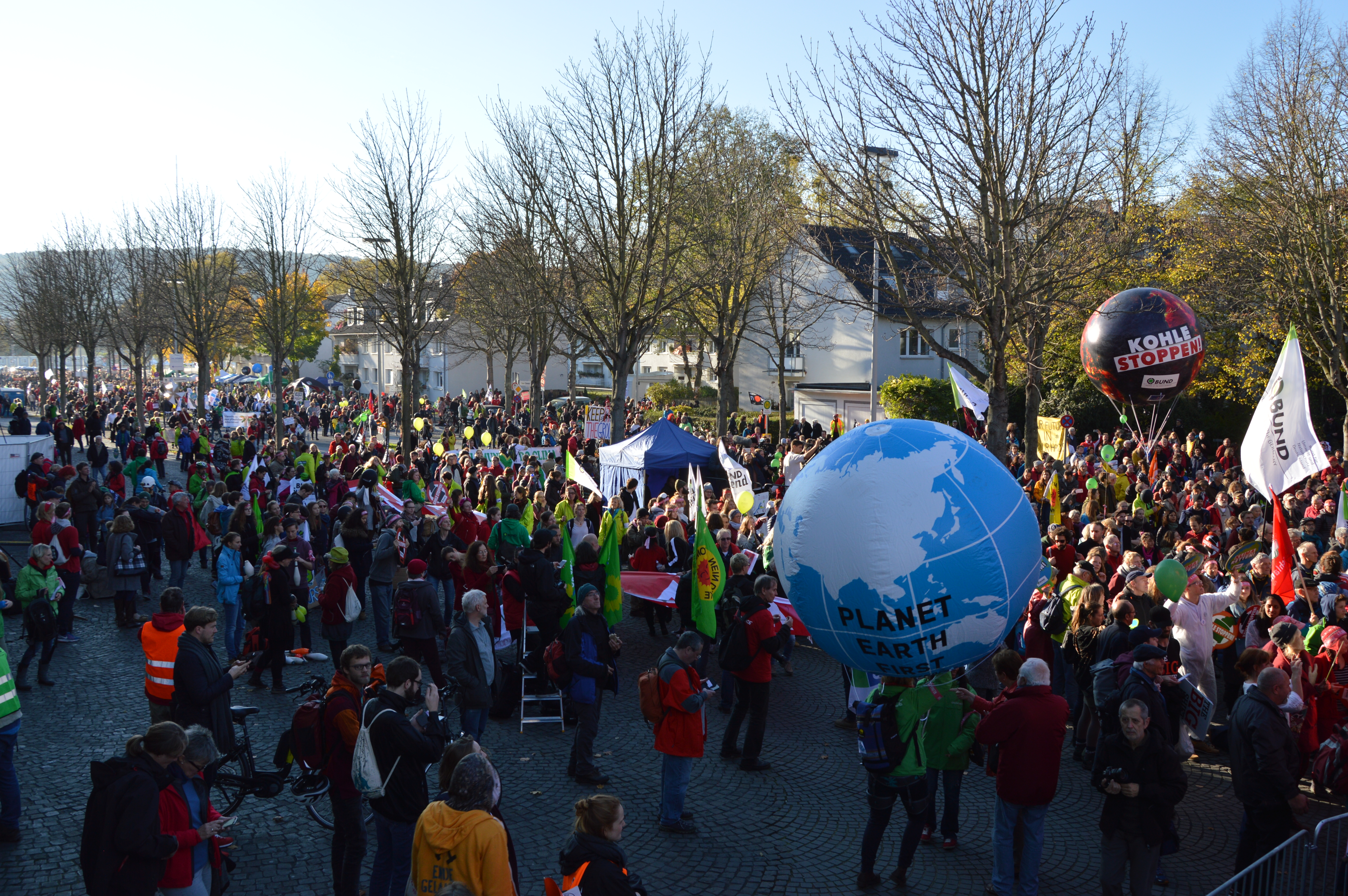
Demonstration in Bonn on 4 November 2017

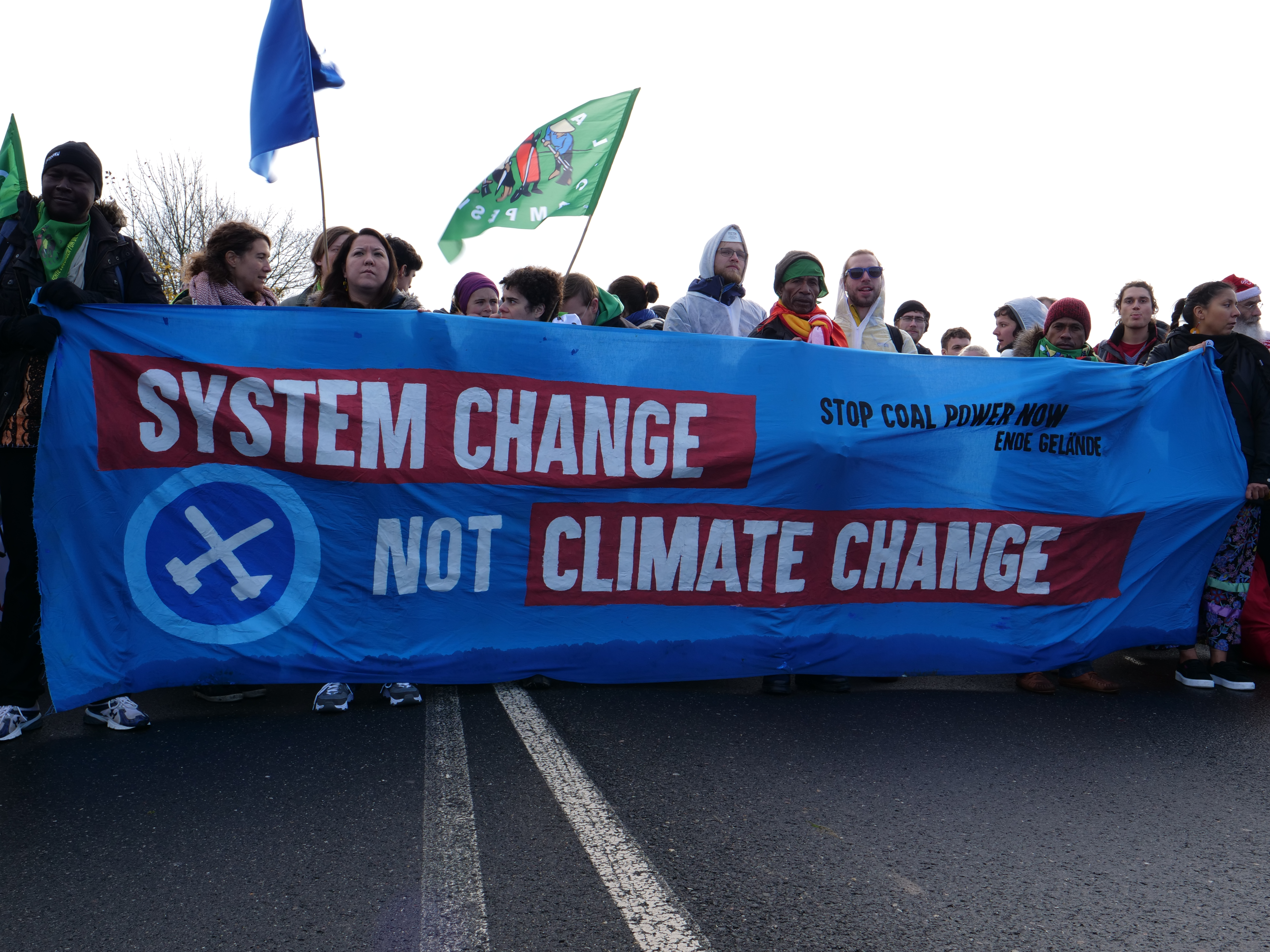
Demonstrators of "Ende Gelände" for action against the climate crisis

The 2017 United Nations Climate Change Conference (COP23) was an international meeting of political leaders, non-state actors and activists to discuss environmental issues. It was held at UN Campus in Bonn, Germany, during 6–17 November 2017. The conference incorporated the 23rd Conference of the Parties to the United Nations Framework Convention on Climate Change (UNFCCC), the thirteenth meeting of the parties for the Kyoto Protocol (CMP13), and the second session of the first meeting of the parties for the Paris Agreement (CMA1-2 or CMA1.2).

The purpose of the conference was to discuss and implement plans about combating climate change, including the details of how the Paris Agreement will work after it enters into force in 2020. The COP was presided over by the Prime Minister of Fiji, Frank Bainimarama, marking the first time a small-island developing state assumed the presidency of the negotiations. The German government provided considerable support that amounted to more than €117 million ($135.5 million) for the construction of the conference facilities.

Although COP23 focused primarily on technical details of the Paris Agreement, it was the first conference of the parties to take place after President Donald Trump announced that the U.S. would withdraw from the agreement.

COP23 concluded with what was called the 'Fiji Momentum for Implementation', which outlined the steps that need to be taken in 2018 to make the Paris Agreement operational and launched the Talanoa Dialogue – a process designed to help countries enhance and implement their Nationally Determined Contributions by 2020.

== Outcomes ==
Significant progress was made on the so-called implementation guidelines for the Paris Agreement – commonly known as the Paris Rulebook – which are the details that will determine how the Agreement will work in practice. COP23 resulted in the Fiji Momentum for Implementation, which reinforced the need for urgent action and increased ambition. Parties will need to finalise the Implementation Guidelines at COP24.

At COP23, the Fijian Presidency announced its approach to the Talanoa Dialogue – known formerly as the Facilitative Dialogue. The Talanoa Dialogue is an inclusive and participatory process designed to allow countries to assess the progress made so far toward achieving the long-term of the Paris Agreement, and to help them increase the ambition of their Nationally Determined Contributions by 2020. The Talanoa Dialogue is a precursor to the global stocktakes that will take place every five years, beginning in 2023.

A rift began to emerge between developed and developing countries over pre-2020 action. On the first day of the conference, developing countries, including China and India, asked for an agenda item to discuss this issue, which refers to the emission cuts that developed countries are required to make prior to 2020 under the Kyoto Protocol. Developed countries resisted this request, arguing that this issue was best discussed in other forums. In the end, Parties agreed to hold additional stocktaking sessions in 2018 and 2019 to review progress on reducing emissions, as well as produce two assessments on climate finance in 2018 and 2020. Several European countries, including the United Kingdom, Germany and Spain, ratified the Doha Amendment during COP23. Also during COP23, Syria announced that it would sign the Paris Agreement, leaving the United States as the only country that has rejected the pact.

Developed and developing countries also agreed to hold an experts dialogue in 2018 on the controversial issue of loss and damage, which will explore options for mobilising expertise, technology and support for the victims of climate change and will inform the next review of the Warsaw International Mechanism in 2019.

Parties reached a historic decision on agriculture after six years of deadlock. The agreement established the Koronivia Joint Work on Agriculture to develop and implement new strategies for mitigation and adaptation the agriculture sector.

Parties also finalized the Gender Action Plan and the Local Communities and Indigenous Peoples Platform, both of which are designed to increase the participation of traditionally marginalized groups in the UN Climate Negotiations.

A group of 30 countries including Britain, Canada and New Zealand launched of the Powering Past Coal Alliance with the aim to phase out coal from power generation by 2030.

In 2017, as a result of conversations at the conference, India Logan-Riley founded Te Ara Whatu – a Māori youth-led initiative which focuses on climate activism.

== Climate Action Zone ==
While the formal negotiations took place in the World Conference Centre Bonn – called the Bula Zone – other non-state actors met in the global climate action zone – the Bonn Zone – located in temporary structures built in Rheinaue Park. The Zone was marked by Fiji's Bula spirit and highlighted the groundswell of activity and innovation being undertaken by local governments, cities, businesses, investors, civil society, youth activists, and ordinary men and women.

During COP23, the German Federal Ministry for Economic Cooperation and Development (BMZ) launched the InsuResilience Global Partnership for Climate and Disaster Risk Finance and Insurance Solutions with the contribution of US$125 million. This aim of this initiative is to bring affordable insurance and other financial protection to millions of vulnerable people around the world.

A delegation of sub-national leaders, led by Governor Jerry Brown of California and former New York City Mayor Michael Bloomberg, travelled to Bonn to present America's Pledge, which reports ongoing efforts to uphold the ongoing efforts the U.S.'s emissions reduction target, even after President Trump announced his intention to withdraw the U.S. from the Paris Agreement.

Separately, Michael Bloomberg used pledged $50 million to expand his anti-coal US campaign into Europe.

The Fijian COP23 Presidency also launched the Ocean Pathway Partnership, which will be co-chaired by Fiji and Sweden, in an effort the strengthen the link between global warming and the health of the world's oceans.

== Attendees ==
More than 30,000 people attended COP23 in Bonn, Germany.

Notable attendees included:

- President Emmanuel Macron of France
- Chancellor Angela Merkel of Germany
- President Baron Waqa of Nauru

as well as California Governor Jerry Brown, Michael Bloomberg and Arnold Schwarzenegger.

Climate adviser David Banks attended, representing the Trump Administration.

=== Observers ===
The Climate Action Business Association (CABA) delegation to COP23 in Bonn, Germany was spearheaded by Executive Director, Michael Green and included policymakers from the Massachusetts State House: Representative Jim Cantwell, Representative Josh Cutler, Representative Jen Benson, and Senator Michael Barrett, and Green at the climate talks. The delegation was supported by staff from Northeastern University.

== Notable quotations ==
On Wednesday 15 November 2017, world leaders such as António Guterres (Secretary-General of the United Nations), Emmanuel Macron (President of France) and Angela Merkel (Chancellor of Germany) delivered speeches at the conference.

- Emmanuel Macron said: "The fight against climate change is by far the most significant struggle of our times" and "Climate change adds further injustice to an already unfair world".
- Angela Merkel notably said: "Climate change is an issue determining our destiny as mankind – it will determine the well-being of all of us". The reliable exit from burning coal to produce electricity is a key issue for environmental organisations, investments of companies and at the negotiations forming a Jamaica coalition with Greens and Free Democrats after the German federal election in September.
- Baron Waqa, President of Nauru added that: "It is now time for the developed countries to live up to their responsibilities".

== See also ==
- CMA 1-1
- CMA 1-3
