= India Logan-Riley =

New Zealand climate activist

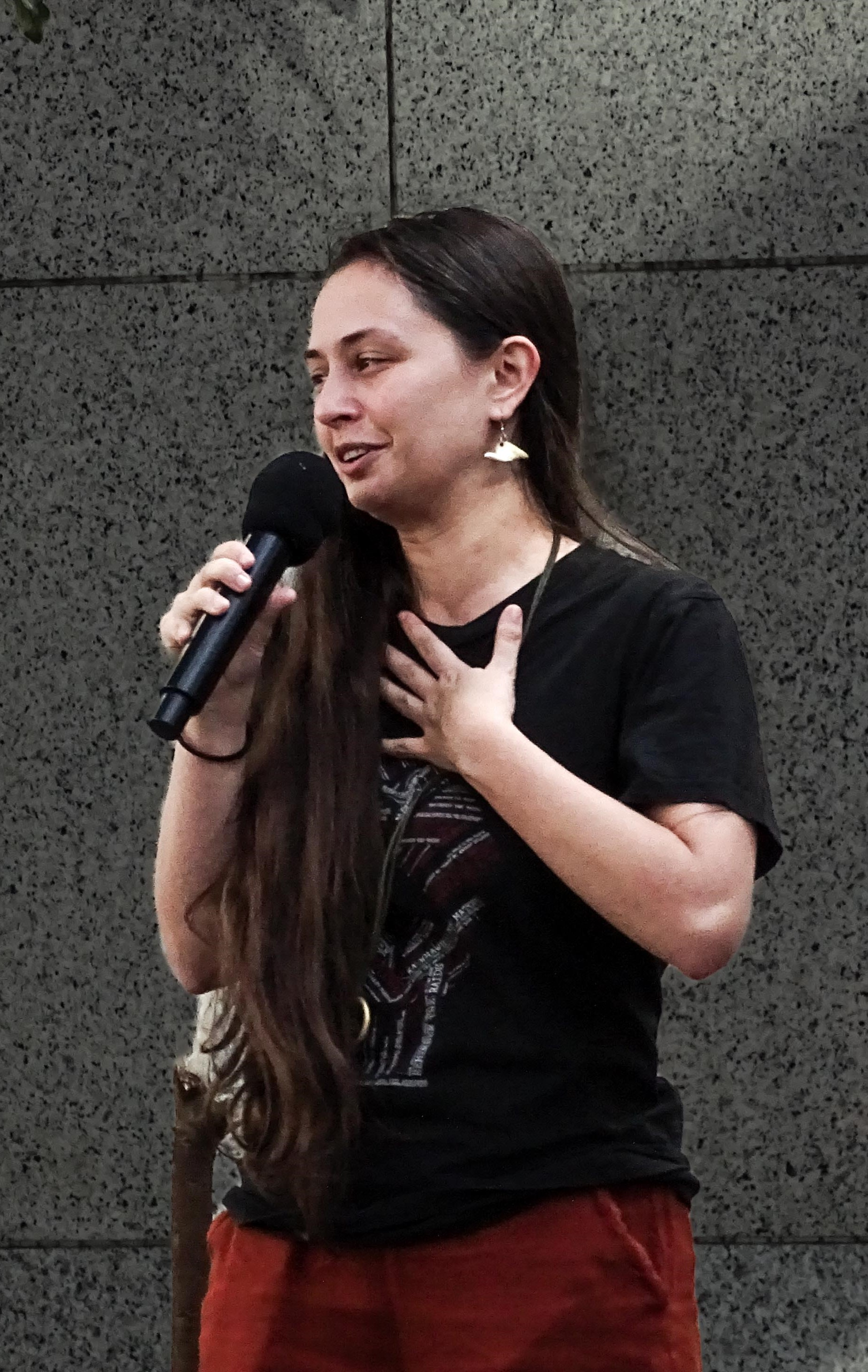
- India Logan-Riley in 2023.
- Education: Stanford University
- Organization: Te Ara Whatu
- Known for: Climate activism

India Logan-Riley is a New Zealand climate activist, who was awarded the 2021 Stanford University Bright Award. Logan-Riley is known for co-founding of Te Ara Whatu, a youth climate activism organisation which consists of Māori and Pacific Peoples (Pasifika).

== Biography ==
Logan-Riley has studied archaeology and Māori history at university. Logan-Riley attended the UN's climate talks in 2015 and 2016, where they (Note: Logan-Riley uses they/them pronouns.) were a member of the Indigenous Peoples’ Caucus. Their activism focuses on the rights of indigenous peoples. The impact of their activism has been discussed in the same context as that of Greta Thunberg and David Attenborough. They have spoken out on how rising sea levels will disproportionately affect Māori communities, in particular since their communities are already over-represented in poverty statistics. Logan-Riley is connected to Kahungunu, Rangitāne and Rongomaiwahine iwi.

In 2017, as a result of conversations at the UN Climate Conference, they founded Te Ara Whatu, a Māori youth-led initiative which focuses on climate activism. The group campaign has campaigned internationally at the UN Climate Conferences, and also campaigns at a national level to ensure that indigenous perspectives are part of the climate crisis planning of the New Zealand government.

In 2021 they were awarded the Bright Award from Stanford University, which includes a prize fund of US$100,000. It recognises individuals who have an especial impact on "environmental preservation and global sustainability".

Logan-Riley addressed the 2021 United Nations Climate Change Conference, where they centred the importance of indigenous knowledge and appealed to the politicians present to "get in line or get out of the way".

== Awards and recognition ==
- Australian Progress Fellowship
- Stanford Bright Award (2021)
