= Africa Climate Change Fund =

African Development Bank trust fund

The Africa Climate Change Fund (the Fund or ACCF) is a multi-donor trust fund that is specifically designed to support the African Development Bank's (AfDB) efforts to finance climate change three times as much as possible while also advancing the bank's mission to create an Africa that is resilient to climate change.

The ACCF wants to see more money raised for climate-related initiatives that consider how climate change is affecting African nations. As a result, the fund's purpose was to function as a catalyst for a variety of low-carbon and climate-resilient initiatives.

== History ==
It was founded in April 2014 by the African Development Bank with the goal of assisting African nations in strengthening their defenses against the adverse effects of climate change and making the transition to low-carbon, sustainable economy. Germany's international development organization, Deutsche Gesellschaft für Internationale Zusammenarbeit GmbH (GIZ), provided the ACC with an initial donation of €4.725 million. The Ministry for the Environment, Land, and Sea, Italy, and the Government of Flanders, Belgium, joined the Fund in early 2017 and made it a multi-donor trust fund. In 2022, Global Affairs Canada, the Government of Quebec, and the Global Center for Adaptation, Canada, joined the fund.

Over the course of its seven-year existence, the ACCF has demonstrated its efficacy as a climate finance instrument by providing funding to small-scale adaptation projects throughout Africa as well as climate finance preparatory efforts. It has aided in the implementation of regional, bank-implemented, civil society, and public sector initiatives.

== Goals and outcomes ==
In order to help African nations meet the goals outlined in their National Determined Contributions (NDCs) and have access to climate funding, the ACCF is essential.

In order to support sustainable development throughout the African continent, the Bank's climate funding will need to be strengthened by the financial contributions of Italy and Flanders as well as collaboration with other donors.

With a total budget of US$3.3 million, ACCF is presently working on 8 projects, 2 of which are multi-regional and 6 of which are in the African nations of Mali, Swaziland, Kenya, Cape Verde, Zanzibar (Tanzania), and Ivory Coast.

The primary goal of the projects is to strengthen recipient governments' capacity-building efforts so that they can carry out a variety of initiatives and programs capable of drawing in international finance for climate change, such as that provided by the Green Climate Fund (GCF).

Additionally, ACCF is working to increase the availability of climate information, foster greater knowledge sharing across recipient nations, and advance awareness of green finance through educational and training initiatives.

African governments, NGOS, research facilities, regional organizations with an African base of operations, and Bank departments are among the direct recipients of the ACCF.

== Those who benefit ==
Governments, NGOs, research institutes, and regional institutions in Africa are among the direct recipients of funding from ACCF. An indirect beneficiary of the fund could also be the Bank. A number of factors, including NGOs' and research organizations' credibility and financial governance results, will determine whether or not they qualify for financing from the ACCF. They must have an African base of operations, too.

== Donors ==
There are five funders to the ACCF: the governments of Quebec, Germany, Flanders, Italy, and Global Affairs Canada. In order to assist over 16 African nations with their preparations for climate funding and the execution of small-scale adaptation initiatives, it has raised about $24.64 million from contributors.

== Achievements ==
Since its founding, the Fund has authorized 27 grants totaling $16.89 million and completed seven projects that have assisted in increasing the ability of over 26 African nations to access international climate money. Additionally, through ACCF programs, nations have been able to increase climate resilience by implementing small-scale adaptation techniques and mobilizing climate funding.
