= Seuʻula Johansson-Fua =

Tongan lecturer

- Born: 1974 (age 51–52)
- Occupations: Director of the Institute for Education, University of the South Pacific

Academic background
- Education: BA Diploma in Teaching, University of Waikato; MA in Educational Administration, University of Toronto; PhD in Educational Administration, University of Toronto

Seuʻula Johansson-Fua (born 1974) is a Tongan academic and educational researcher. Her research explores how indigenous concepts of leadership can be tools in education systems across the Pacific region. She is currently Director of the Institute of Education at the University of the South Pacific.

== Early life and education ==
Seuʻula Fua was born in 1974. She received her MA in Educational Administration from the University of Toronto and a BA Diploma in Teaching from the University of Waikato. She earned her PhD in Educational Administration from the University of Toronto.

== Career ==
Johansson-Fua is Director of the Institute of Education at the University of the South Pacific. In 2018 she initiated a Network for Educational Research which brought together education ministries from a variety of Pacific countries for the first time to further collaborative research and understanding.

== Research interests ==
As a Tongan academic, Johansson-Fua sees her Tongan rather than a general indigenous identity as central to her practise.

One strand of her research explores ideas of indigenous leadership and how they might be applied within education. This includes how the Tongan concept of fakaʻapaʻapa guides ideas of leadership in that country. This concept is based on four key principles: generosity, love, helpfulness, and humility. Another strand of her research in education centres on talanoa, a traditional oral communication method amongst Pacific Islanders.

As an educational researcher, Johansson-Fua has published on how schools and school relationships need to function within local cultural contexts. One application of this model was the Rethinking Pacific Education Initiative by Pacific Peoples for Pacific Peoples (RPEIPP), an academic and educational research project which Johansson-Fua convened. She has been vocal in addressing the absence of input from Pacific Islanders in international and comparative educational research.

Johansson-Fua also oversees the Kukū Kaunaka Collection, an archive commissioned by King Tupou VI which contains doctoral and masters dissertations written by Tongan scholars at universities around the world.

The United Nations Population Fund commissioned Johansson-Fua to produce a report on domestic violence in Tonga. In 2012, Johansson-Fua was a member of the team that assessed the potential for heritage tourism in Tonga.

== Impact ==
Johansson-Fua's work on talanoa has inspired the foundation of the arts organisation Talanoa.

== Selected bibliography ==
- Johansson Fua, S. (2007), "Looking towards the source – social justice and leadership conceptualisations from Tonga", Journal of Educational Administration, Vol. 45 No. 6.
- Johansson Fua, S. (2016), "The Oceanic Researcher and the Search for a Space in Comparative and International Education", International Education Journal: Comparative Perspectives, Vol. 15 No. 3.
