= Assembly of Christian Churches in Fiji =

The Assembly of Christian Churches in Fiji is an umbrella organization comprising several conservative Christian denominations in Fiji. The ACCF website describes the ministry as working "to encourage support and strengthen member churches through its constituted vision, mission, objects, powers and all related activities," with a goal of facilitating "reconciliation, unity, peace, and prosperity in Fiji."

== The ACCF and the coup of 2006 ==
The ACCF strongly condemned the military coup which deposed the government of Prime Minister Laisenia Qarase on 5 December 2006. On the day of the coup, Chairman Rev. Tuikilakila Waqairatu said the ACCF would oppose the formation of any interim government. Other media quoted him as saying that the ACCF statement was "politically biased and theologically flawed," and that it was hypocritical to oppose this coup after failing to oppose the previous coup led by George Speight in 2000.

The presence of the ACCF at a meeting of the Great Council of Chiefs in December 2006 to discuss the recent military coup was criticized by the Military.

The ACCF was formerly chaired by Rev. Ratu Epeli Kanaimawi, who was appointed Fiji's High Commissioner to Malaysia in August 2006. The Fiji Sun quoted the Military on 30 August as stating its opposition to the appointment, saying that Kanaimawi had been implicated as a supporter of the civilian coup of 2000, which was fronted by George Speight.

On 20 December 2006, the Military announced that it was investigating a F$20,000 gift to the ACCF by deposed Prime Minister Qarase just before the May 2006 parliamentary elections.

The Assembly of Christian Churches ran an advertisement during the lead up to the 2006 elections.
