= Charls Walker =

Charls Edward Walker (December 24, 1923 – June 2, 2015) was Under Secretary of the United States Department of the Treasury from 1969 to 1972, and Deputy Secretary of the Treasury in 1973 under John Connally.

== Personal life, education, and early career ==
Walker was born in Graham, Texas. Walker married Harmolyn Hart in 1949. He received his bachelors and MBA degrees from the University of Texas at Austin. He received a Ph.D. in economics from the Wharton School of the University of Pennsylvania in 1955. He then was a professor for a time at the University of Texas at Austin. He then worked as an economist with the Federal Reserve Bank of Philadelphia and as an executive with Republic National Bank of Dallas. In 1961 he became Executive Vice President of the American Bankers Association, a position he retained until 1969. Walker died of heart disease on June 2, 2015 at the age of 91 in Rockville, Maryland.

== Lobbying and political consulting ==
After leaving the Nixon administration Walker established a consulting firm. When he told Nixon that he was leaving government, the president said, "You’re going to be doing what you have been, but now making money at it." Walker described the large companies he represented as "a few mom-and-pop clients." Over the course of his career, these included General Motors, Gulf Oil, and major airlines. Walker established the ACCF in order to provide credibility to his advocacy for big business.

While defending the fully tax-deductible "three-martini lunch" in 1977 Walker said, "How could you set a ceiling that would apply both to a small town in Texas, where I recently bought a business lunch for two for $7, and to New York City, where you can pay anything?"

Walker advised John Connally during his brief 1980 presidential campaign. After Connally left the race, Walker joined the campaign of Ronald Reagan. Walker said of himself, "I think I provided the key memo." The memo he referred to offered a rationale for cutting taxes and general government spending while increasing military spending. According to Sidney Blumenthal, his other clients, such as the Business Roundtable, were relieved to know he was close to Reagan, whom they regarded as potentially dangerous. Walker and the ACCF won large cuts in corporate taxes in Reagan's 1981 economics legislation.

His ACCF colleague, Mark Bloomfield, said of Walker, "Charly was the classic caricature of the cigar-smoking super-lobbyist with a limo." Lyndon B. Johnson called Walker "an S.O.B. with elbows." Walker replied, "Where I come from, that’s a term of endearment."

== Sources ==
- Martin B. Hickman. David Matthew Kennedy: Banker, Statesman, Churchman. (Salt Lake City: Deseret Book, 1987) p. 248.
- Register of the Charls E. Walker papers
