= Climate change policy of the George W. Bush administration =

The climate change policy of the United States under the presidency of George W. Bush can be categorized into two major components: a technological strategy to reduce carbon emissions and one with an emission intensity target to reduce carbon emissions by 18 percent. Bush backed out on the promises on the campaign trail to regulate carbon dioxide emissions from power plants. One of the most notable policies during his administration is his opposition to the Kyoto Protocol.

The administration prioritized technological solutions to combat climate change, such as the $1.2 billion Hydrogen Fuel Initiative and the FreedomCAR program, aimed at reducing carbon emissions from vehicles and promoting energy independence. Internationally, Bush launched the Generation IV International Forum to advance nuclear energy as a cleaner alternative to fossil fuels and supported debt-for-nature swaps to conserve tropical forests. Domestically, the Energy Policy Act of 2005 balanced energy independence with environmental goals, providing incentives for renewable energy, biofuels, and clean coal technologies.

The Bush administration was criticized for undermining scientific research and promoting industry interests. Reports emerged of political pressure on scientists to downplay the threat of global warming, edits to scientific documents, and suppression of key findings related to climate change. The administration's close ties to fossil fuel industries and business lobbyists further fueled accusations of prioritizing economic and corporate interests over environmental concerns. This contentious approach to climate policy had lasting implications, affecting both U.S. efforts to mitigate global warming and its international standing in climate governance.

== Campaign promises ==
During the George W. Bush's 2000 Presidential Campaign, he pledged to regulate emissions of carbon dioxide coming from power plants and would establish carbon dioxide as a pollutant. Two months later, in March 2001, the Bush Administration backed down of this promise. In a letter sent to Senator Chuck Hagel, he cited increasing energy costs, and an "incomplete state of scientific knowledge of the causes of, and solutions to, global climate change and the lack of commercially available technologies for removing and storing carbon dioxide". This change in policy reflected a Department of Energy report, that stated that including carbon dioxide as a pollutant "would lead to an even more dramatic shift from coal to natural gas for electric power generation and significantly higher electricity prices, compared to scenarios in which only sulfur dioxide and nitrogen oxides were reduced." Bush states that he supported a "comprehensive and balanced energy policy that takes into account the importance of improving air quality." White House spokesman Scott McClellan, stated that including this campaign promise was "a mistake".

This campaign reversal was widely criticized by environmentalists and legislators from both Republican and Democratic parties. Critics include Senators Max Baucus and Lincoln Chafee, stating that the reversal was "very unfortunate" and that the president's stance was "concerning", respectively. Carl Pope, executive director of the Sierra Club, a notable environmental organization, stated "During the campaign, Governor Bush tried to claim an environmental mantle, but in the White House he's bowing to big business instead of honoring his commitment to our children."

== Kyoto Protocol ==
In March 2001, the Bush administration announced that it would not implement the Kyoto Protocol, an international treaty signed in 1997 in Kyoto, Japan, that would require nations to reduce their greenhouse gas emissions, claiming that ratifying the treaty would create economic setbacks in the U.S. and does not put enough pressure to limit emissions from developing nations. In June 2001, Bush stated he will continue to oppose the Kyoto accord.

In February 2002, Bush announced his alternative to the Kyoto Protocol, by bringing forth a plan to reduce the intensity of greenhouse gases by 18 percent over 10 years. The intensity of greenhouse gases specifically is the ratio of greenhouse gas emissions and economic output, meaning that under this plan, emissions would still continue to grow, but at a slower pace. Bush stated that this plan would prevent the release of 500 million metric tons of greenhouse gases, which is about the equivalent of 70 million cars from the road. This target would achieve this goal by providing tax credits to businesses that use renewable energy sources.

Critics have stated that withdrawing from the Kyoto Protocol would undermine the legitimacy of the United States in regard to international climate governance. There were also concerns that the Bush Administration's policies were too lax and not enough to combat climate change compared to the Kyoto Protocol.

== Policy initiatives ==
The Bush Administration emphasized market-based solutions and voluntary approaches to address the issue of climate change. In 2002, the Bush Administration released its Global Climate Change policy book, which detailed the initiatives that the administration would take. Such initiatives included the Climate Change Technology Program (CCTP), which was created to help allocate $3 billion of annual investment in climate policy research. Bush also proposed a number of international policies such as debt-for-nature programs, which would encourage developing nations to conserve tropical forest in exchange for debt relief, increasing the amount of funding of transferring clean energy and sequestration technologies to developing countries, and Joint Research Initiatives.

=== Technological initiatives ===
The Bush Administration emphasized technological and market-based solutions to help solve the issue to climate change. During Bush's 2003 State of the Union address, he announced a $1.2 billion hydrogen fuel initiative to promote research into hydrogen fuel cells in order to reduce the amount of carbon emissions from automotive vehicles. His administration argued that this will allow the United States to be less dependent on foreign oil and achieve energy independence. This also coincides with Bush's initiative of FreedomCAR, which is a partnership to advance hydrogen fuel research for vehicles.

Bush also helped create the Generation IV International Forum (GIF) in 2001. This forum sought to expand the use of nuclear energy as an alternative to fossil fuels internationally by encouraging cooperation in research and development for Generation IV reactors. Current signatories include Argentina, Australia, Brazil, Canada, France, Japan, South Korea, China, Russia, the United Kingdom, and the United States.

=== Legislative initiatives ===
The Bush Administration’s legislative agenda included bills that helped shape the energy and environmental landscape of the United States. His administration also opposed legislation such as the America's Climate Security Act of 2007, stating that it would increase taxes and harm the economy.

==== Energy Policy Act of 2005 ====
The Energy Policy Act of 2005 was signed by President Bush on August 8, 2005. The Energy Policy Act focused on balancing energy independence with environmental goals, offering tax incentives for renewable energy, supporting "clean coal" and nuclear technologies, and advancing biofuels as an alternative source of energy. The Energy Policy Act also created the Climate Change Technology Program, which was effectively dissolved during the Obama Administration.

Energy Independence and Security Act of 2007 (EISA)

The Energy Independence and Security Act of 2007 was signed by President Bush on December 19, 2007. The Energy Independence and Security Act sought to increase fuel economy vehicles, incentivise car manufacturers to build more electric vehicles, increase the total amount of biofuels in gasoline, and set standards for energy efficiency.

== Influence of industry groups ==
In 2001, petroleum company executives, which includes ExxonMobil, Conoco, Shell Oil, and BP America met with Vice President Dick Cheney's Energy Task Force.

In June 2005, US State Department papers showed the Bush administration thanking Exxon executives for the company's "active involvement" in helping to determine climate change policy, including the U.S. stance on Kyoto. Input from the business lobby group Global Climate Coalition was also a factor.

The Bush administration implemented an industry-formulated disinformation campaign designed to actively mislead the American public on global warming and to forestall limits on "climate polluters," according to a report in Rolling Stone magazine which reviews hundreds of internal government documents and former government officials.

"'They've got a political clientele that does not want to be regulated,' says Rick S. Piltz, a former Bush climate official who blew the whistle on White House censorship of global-warming documents in 2005. 'Any honest discussion of the science would stimulate public pressure for a stronger policy. They're not stupid.'

Bush's do-nothing policy on global warming began almost as soon as he took office. By pursuing a carefully orchestrated policy of delay, the White House blocked even the most modest reforms and replaced them with token investments in futuristic solutions like hydrogen cars. 'It's a charade,' says Jeremy Symons, who represented the EPA on Dick Cheney's energy task force, the industry-studded group that met in secret to craft the administration's energy policy. 'They have a single-minded determination to do nothing—while making it look like they are doing something.' . . .

The CEQ became Cheney's shadow EPA, with industry calling the shots. To head up the council, Cheney installed James Connaughton, a former lobbyist for industrial polluters, who once worked to help General Electric and ARCO skirt responsibility for their Superfund waste sites.

...two weeks after Bush took office - ExxonMobil's top lobbyist, Randy Randol, demanded a housecleaning of the scientists in charge of studying global warming. . .

...Exxon's wish was the CEQ's command.

== Political pressure on scientists ==
According to testimony taken by the U.S. House of Representatives, the Bush White House pressured American scientists to suppress discussion of global warming.

"High-quality science" was "struggling to get out," as the Bush administration pressured scientists to tailor their writings on global warming to fit the Bush administration's skepticism, in some cases at the behest of an ex-oil industry lobbyist. "Nearly half of all respondents perceived or personally experienced pressure to eliminate the words 'climate change,' 'global warming' or other similar terms from a variety of communications."

Similarly, according to the testimony of senior officers of the Government Accountability Project, the White House attempted to bury the report "National Assessment of the Potential Consequences of Climate Variability and Change," produced by U.S. scientists pursuant to U.S. law. Some U.S. scientists resigned their jobs rather than give in to White House pressure to underreport global warming.

Also, the White House removed key portions of a Centers for Disease Control and Prevention (CDC) report given to the U.S. Senate Environment and Public Works Committee about the dangers to human health of global warming. According to one CDC official familiar with both the CDC version and the version given to the Senate, the version given to the Senate was "eviscerated." The White House prevented the Senate and thus the public from receiving key CDC estimates in the report about diseases likely to flourish in a warmer climate, increased injuries and deaths from severe weather such as hurricanes, more respiratory problems from drought-driven air pollution, an increase in waterborne diseases including cholera, increases in vector-borne diseases including malaria and hantavirus, mental health problems such as depression and post-traumatic stress, and how many people might be adversely affected because of increased warming.

US officials, such as Philip Cooney, have repeatedly edited scientific reports from US government scientists, many of whom, such as Thomas Knutson, have been ordered to refrain from discussing climate change and related topics.

Climate scientist James E. Hansen, director of NASA's Goddard Institute for Space Studies, claimed in a widely cited New York Times article in 2006 that his superiors at the agency were trying to "censor" information "going out to the public." NASA denied this, saying that it was merely requiring that scientists make a distinction between personal, and official government, views in interviews conducted as part of work done at the agency. Several scientists working at the National Oceanic and Atmospheric Administration have made similar complaints; once again, government officials said they were enforcing long-standing policies requiring government scientists to clearly identify personal opinions as such when participating in public interviews and forums.

In 2006, the BBC's long-running current affairs series Panorama investigated the issue, and was told that "scientific reports about global warming have been systematically changed and suppressed."

According to an Associated Press release on January 30, 2007,

...climate scientists at seven government agencies say they have been subjected to political pressure aimed at downplaying the threat of global warming. The groups presented a survey that shows two in five of the 279 climate scientists who responded to a questionnaire complained that some of their scientific papers had been edited in a way that changed their meaning. Nearly half of the 279 said in response to another question that at some point they had been told to delete reference to "global warming" or "climate change" from a report.

Critics writing in the Wall Street Journal editorial page claim that the survey was itself unscientific.

Attempts to suppress scientific information on global warming and other issues have been described by Chris Mooney as constituting a Republican War on Science.

In 2008, Jason Burnett, who was senior adviser on climate change in the EPA, claimed Dick Cheney's office had sought to remove references to climate change in a testimony given to Congress by CDC Director Julie Gerberding.

== Attempts to undermine U.S. and state efforts ==
The Bush administration worked to undermine state efforts to mitigate global warming. At the beginning of his presidency, he pledged to let states and the federal government work cooperatively. The administration’s early actions, such as supporting the 2002 Small Business Liability Relief and Brownfields Revitalization Act, suggested a willingness to empower states. However, this changed throughout his time in office. Federal contributions to state environmental programs declined, dropping from 70% in the 1970s to roughly 30% by the mid-2000s. Simultaneously, the administration imposed additional mandates on states, often without providing proportional funding or flexibility, placing significant strain on state environmental agencies. These actions demonstrated a preference for federal oversight, limiting states' autonomy to innovate and address pressing environmental concerns on their own terms.

The Bush Administration’s policies frequently undermined state-led environmental efforts. One prominent example was the administration’s reinterpretation of the Clean Air Act, which aimed to reduce the scope of regulatory authority granted to states. Legal challenges further constrained state initiatives, as federal agencies sought to preempt state policies deemed more stringent than national standards.

Mary Peters, the transportation secretary at that time, personally directed US efforts to urge governors and dozens of members of the House of Representatives to block California's first-in-the-nation limits on greenhouse gases from cars and trucks, according to e-mails obtained by Congress.

== See also ==
- Climate change in the United States
- Politics of the United States
