= Environmental issues in Equatorial Guinea =

Equatorial Guinea faces many environmental challenges, including deforestation and habitat degradation, biodiversity loss, oil and gas pollution and poor waste management. Infrastructure projects and urban growth threaten forests and coastal areas, while many species are endangered by habitat destruction and hunting. Oil extraction and industrial activities contribute to pollution. Limited sewage and waste systems further degrade rivers, coasts and ecosystems.

== Land degradation and deforestation ==
Protected nature in Equatorial Guinea

Between 1990 and 2000, Equatorial Guinea lost an average of 15,200 hectares of forest per year. This leads to an average annual deforestation rate of 0.82%. Between 2000 and 2005, the rate of forest change increased by 8.9% to 0.89% per annum. In total, between 1990 and 2005, Equatorial Guinea lost 12.3% of its forest, or around 228,000 hectares. However Equatorial Guinea’s forest management has improved in recent years, with protected areas significantly increasing decreasing deforestation.

=== REDD+ reference level and monitoring ===
Under the UNFCCC REDD+ framework, Equatorial Guinea has submitted a national forest reference emission level (FREL). On the UNFCCC REDD+ Web Platform, the country's 2020 submission is listed as having an assessed reference level, while the other Warsaw Framework elements - a national strategy, safeguards, and a national forest monitoring system - are listed as "not reported".

The first assessed FREL, technically assessed in 2022, covered the REDD+ activities "reducing emissions from deforestation" and "reducing emissions from forest degradation" at national scale. Following the technical assessment, the reference period was modified from 2014-2018 to 2013-2018, although the assessed FREL remained 8,552,900 t CO2 eq per year. The technical assessment states that the benchmark included above-ground biomass, below-ground biomass, deadwood and litter, and reported CO2 only, while no adjustment for national circumstances was applied.

The technical assessment also reports that the forest definition used for the FREL was land of at least 1 hectare with trees at least 5 metres tall and canopy cover of at least 30%. Although the REDD+ Web Platform lists a national forest monitoring system as "not reported", the submission itself describes a developing national forest monitoring system with two components: a satellite land monitoring system that supplied the activity data and a national forest inventory that was still under design at the time of submission.

== Oil and gas infrastructure ==
Equatorial Guinea’s oil and gas industry has had significant environmental consequences, particularly for its coastal and sea ecosystems. Oil spills and leaks from offshore platforms and pipelines threaten mangroves, seagrass beds, and fish habitats, disrupting the balance of these ecosystems and harming local fishing places The construction and maintenance of infrastructure also disturb terrestrial and island habitats, hurting forests and affecting wildlife populations

Operational activities add to add water pollution through accidental spills, industrial runoff, and waste spilling. These pollutants spoil forests, wetlands, and freshwater systems, reducing biodiversity and messing up ecosystem services that local communities rely on for water, food,

Environmental monitoring in the country is limited, with weak monitoring. As a result, many negative impacts from oil and gas industry such as habitat destruction, pollution, and emissions remain concerning for Equatorial Guinea environment

== Waste management and plastic pollution ==
Equatorial Guniea has immense challenges with waste management and plastic pollution primarily due to a lack of adequate infrastructure. In 2019, approximately 30.5% of municipal solid waste was inadequately managed Efforts are under way to ensure changes are made to make waste management so it can be properly functioning for the whole country without excessive pollution.
