= Deforestation in Zimbabwe =

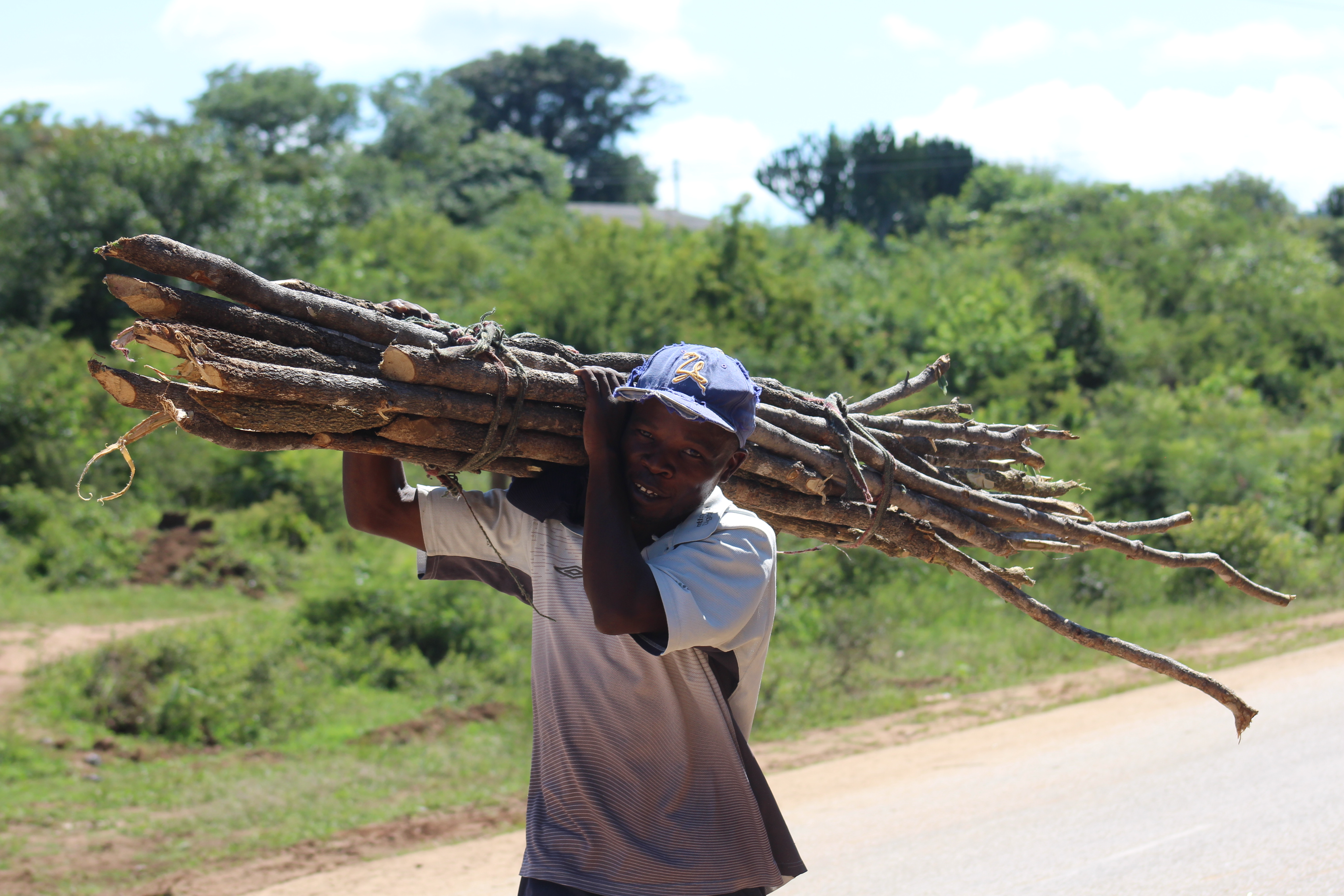
Tree cut down to provide firewood

Research in Africa

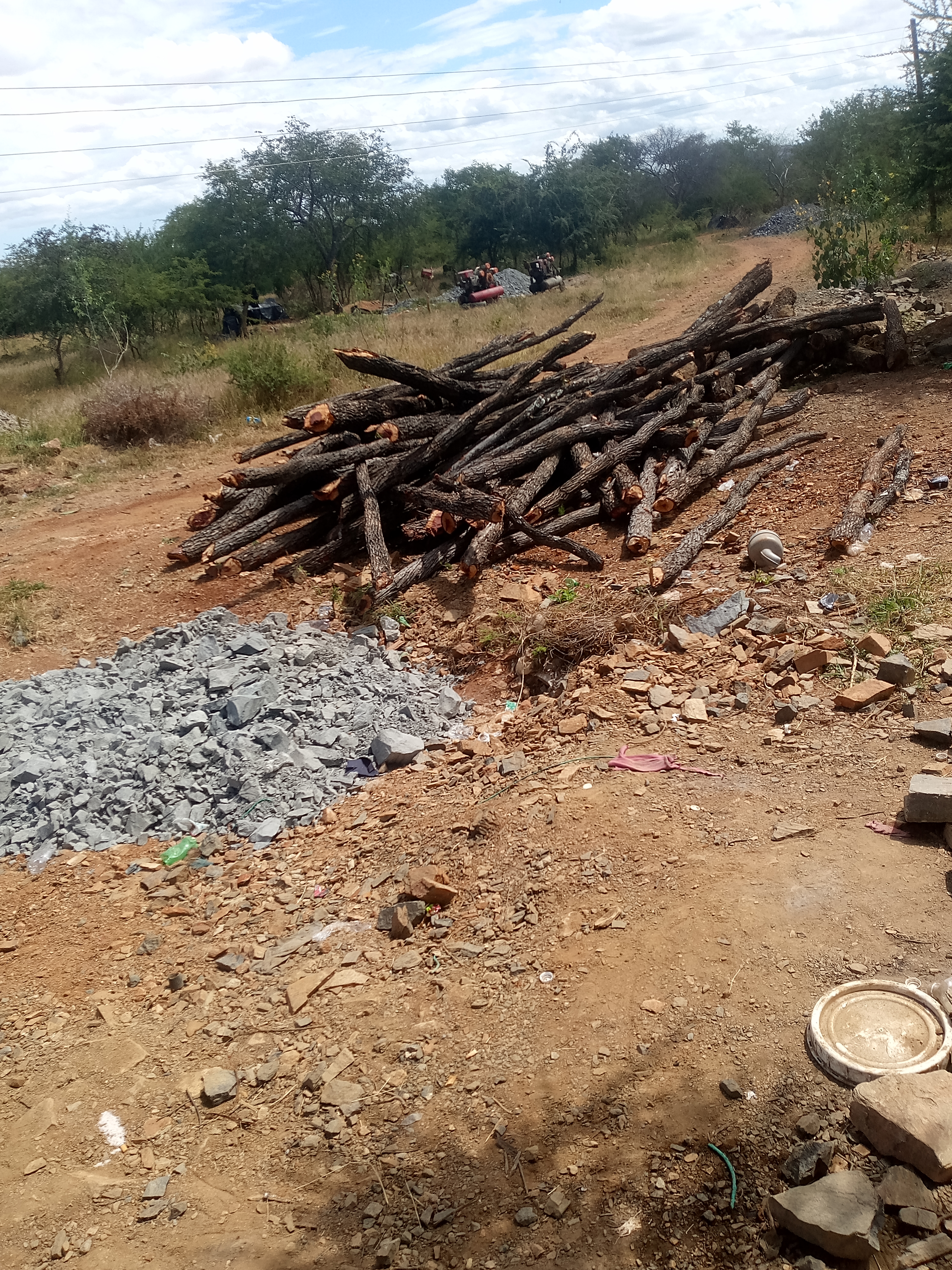
Trees cut down

Deforestation is the purposeful clearing of forested land. Zimbabwe hosts some of the most important biodiversity hotspots in the world and is home to species of plants and animals. Forests currently cover around 45% of the country's total land area, but deforestation is an increasingly pressing issue, resulting in forests disappearing quickly. The rate of deforestation in the country accelerated to 327,000 ha per year (1.9%) during the years 2000 and 2010 and is also currently the highest in Southern Africa. In fact, the rate of deforestation in Zimbabwe is one of the highest globally – directly affecting ecosystems, biodiversity, and livelihoods. In 2010, Zimbabwe had 1.06Mha of tree cover, extending over 2.7% of its land area. In 2021, it lost 9.05kha of tree cover, equivalent to 3.82Mt of CO_{2} emissions.

== Causes of deforestation in Zimbabwe ==
The major causes of deforestation include inter-alia:

Firewood

In developing countries like Zimbabwe and in much of the rest of sub-Saharan Africa, fuelwood is a major source of energy for cooking and heating for people who cannot afford electricity. A 2014 study published in Resources and Environment highlights the severity of this issue in Zimbabwe. The study, which explores firewood consumption patterns, shines light on the severe shortage of electricity in Zimbabwe. It blames a weak infrastructure, erratic supply, maintenance issues and the unaffordable cost of electricity in the face of unemployment and low incomes for contributing to increased use of firewood, which, in turn, is driving deforestation in the country.

The study points out that the use of firewood in urban areas is a more imminent environmental concern than its use in rural areas. Rural households do not cut down whole trees and often collect dead wood which has a less intense environmental impact than urban firewood harvesting, which is concentrated on specific areas to reduce transport costs and involves cutting whole, live trees. The study says a high demand for firewood in Zimbabwe's urban areas is causing deforestation and land degradation in other parts of the country – despite sustainability goals set forth in a United Nations Development Programme report pledging to curb deforestation by the end of 2015.

Zimbabwe is not an exception as most countries in African dependent entirely on wood for fuel. An estimated 90 percent of the entire continent's population uses fuelwood for cooking; in sub-Saharan Africa, firewood and brush supply nearly 52 percent of all energy sources. However, even those who have access to electricity are subject to erratic power supplies from the state-owned Zimbabwe Electricity Supply Authority (ZESA), which is failing to meet the demand for electricity owing to insufficient finances to import power. There is increased electricity outages in most urban centres and most urban dwellers resort to buying firewood from vendors at local market stalls, who get this from farms neighboring the cities. While the government claims it is doing all it can to fight deforestation, the indigenous timber merchants say that the faltering economy might make it hard for them to stop cutting down trees.

Settlements

Urban expansion and population growth have also significantly contributed towards deforestation by clearing land for developing houses, roads and public infrastructure. Cities are often expanding into forested areas. As such, the area covered by urban zones is projected to expand by more than 1.2 million square kilometers between 2000 and 2030. This leads to deforestation as forests are being cleared to make way for commercial land use to build infrastructure to cater to the growing population.

Agriculture

Expansion of arable land to advance agricultural activities results in the clearing of vast pieces of land.

Wildfire

In Zimbabwe the peak fire season typically begins in mid-August and lasts around 14 weeks. There were 8,757 VIIRS fire alerts reported between 4th of April 2022 and 27th of March 2023 considering high confidence alerts only. This is unusually high compared to previous years going back to 2012. From 2001 to 2021, Zimbabwe lost 3.30kha of tree cover from fires and 221kha from all other drivers of loss. The year with the most tree cover loss due to fires during this period was 2009 with 565ha lost to fires — 2.9% of all tree cover loss for that year.

Tobacco curing

Another significant industry in Zimbabwe is tobacco, which has also been in the limelight recently for accelerating deforestation. According to an article published by the Inter Press Service (IPS), forests are being cleared and converted to tobacco fields in some remote areas. The blame on deforestation is squarely on the growing numbers of tobacco farmers who cut down trees to use to cure the cash crop. There are more than 88,000 tobacco farmers in Zimbabwe, according to the Tobacco Industry Marketing Board. Tobacco leaves are dried, or cured, by circulating hot air around them for a week. In Zimbabwe, wood is the fuel of choice for curing tobacco.Tobacco farmers are responsible for a fifth of the total annual deforestation in Zimbabwe, cutting down trees to burn in their curing barns. While the practice is not permitted, enforcement remains lax, and solutions such as establishing woodlots have not proved fast or scalable enough to address the problem.

Charcoal

Charcoal production has been identified as one of the main drivers of deforestation and forest degradation in Zimbabwe. The traditional methods of making charcoal lead to high carbon emissions and are a waste of wood resources.

Brick making

A surge in production of farm bricks is fast becoming a key driver of deforestation in Zimbabwe. They come at a high cost of environmental degradation and deforestation. As huge pits are excavated for clay soil required to mould the bricks, substantial amounts of trees are cut down for firewood needed in their drying process. Reports by the Environmental Management Agency (EMA) now deem farm brick production as one of three major drivers of deforestation in Zimbabwe. While backfilling can recover farm brick production effect on land, it is the tree population that is affected most by this practice. Unlike tobacco curing which is seasonal, only presenting devastation on tree population once every year when the leaf is ripe, farm brick production has an all year rounding effect. Trees are key in reducing the amount of carbon dioxide released into the atmosphere. Large amounts of carbon accumulating in the atmosphere are causing global warming, the mother of climate change.

== Impact of deforestation in Zimbabwe ==
Demand for fuel destroys forests in most urban and rural areas globally, and Zimbabwe is not an exception. Loss of trees leads to environmental degradation and increased erosion. Where dried dung is used instead of firewood, soil fertility is lost and harvests are reduced. Without plant cover, erosion can occur and sweep the land into rivers. The agricultural plants that often replace the trees cannot hold onto the soil and many of these plants, such as coffee, cotton, palm oil, soybean and wheat, can actually worsen soil erosion. And as land loses its fertile soil, agricultural producers move on, clear more forest and continue the cycle of soil loss.

== Response ==
Environmental legislation is administered by various Government Departments in various ministries. The Ministry of Environment, Water and Climate, however, administers most of those acts that deal with the environment directly. Zimbabwe is different from most Southern African countries in that its environmental legislation is comprehensive, and covers all the most important areas. There are nearly 20 Acts and nearly 40 statutory laws that are used in the country. Of the most important include the Natural Resources Act (1941), Forest Act (1949), Harzoudous Substances and Articles Act (1977), Atmospheric Pollution Prevention Act (1971) Water Act (1976) and Communal Land Act (1982). The absence of a framework law or umbrella legislation has not made any stumbling blocks or draw backs in enforcement.

== Tree cover extent and loss ==
Global Forest Watch publishes annual estimates of tree cover loss and 2000 tree cover extent derived from time-series analysis of Landsat satellite imagery in the Global Forest Change dataset. In this framework, tree cover refers to vegetation taller than 5 m (including natural forests and tree plantations), and tree cover loss is defined as the complete removal of tree cover canopy for a given year, regardless of cause.

For Zimbabwe, country statistics report cumulative tree cover loss of 243,432 ha (2,434.32 km^{2}) from 2001 to 2024 (about 17.2% of its 2000 tree cover area). For tree cover density greater than 30%, country statistics report a 2000 tree cover extent of 1,411,915 ha (14,119.15 km^{2}). The charts and table below display this data. In simple terms, the annual loss number is the area where tree cover disappeared in that year, and the extent number shows what remains of the 2000 tree cover baseline after subtracting cumulative loss. Forest regrowth is not included in the dataset.

Annual tree cover loss in Zimbabwe, 2001–2024. View chart definition.
Tree cover extent in 2000 minus cumulative tree cover loss in Zimbabwe, 2001–2024 (loss-only residual; does not account for gain). View chart definition.

Annual tree cover extent and loss
Year	Tree cover extent (km2) (Note: This residual measure does not include forest regrowth.)	Annual tree cover loss (km2)
2001	14,037.24	81.91
2002	13,957.13	80.11
2003	13,883.98	73.15
2004	13,799.80	84.18
2005	13,682.32	117.48
2006	13,533.56	148.76
2007	13,440.61	92.95
2008	13,386.34	54.27
2009	13,192.37	193.97
2010	13,126.09	66.28
2011	13,035.77	90.32
2012	12,897.86	137.91
2013	12,801.78	96.08
2014	12,705.64	96.14
2015	12,583.20	122.44
2016	12,473.94	109.26
2017	12,214.81	259.13
2018	12,149.40	65.41
2019	12,034.26	115.14
2020	11,972.25	62.01
2021	11,882.12	90.13
2022	11,799.86	82.26
2023	11,743.17	56.69
2024	11,684.83	58.34

== REDD+ reference level and monitoring ==
Under the UNFCCC REDD+ framework, Zimbabwe has submitted a national forest reference emission level (FREL). On the UNFCCC REDD+ Web Platform, the country's 2024 submission is listed as having an assessed reference level, while a national strategy, safeguards information and a national forest monitoring system are all listed as "not reported".

The first assessed FREL, submitted in 2024 and technically assessed the same year, covered the REDD+ activity "reducing emissions from deforestation" at national scale. Using a 2016-2021 reference period, the original submission proposed 4,255,249.2 t CO2 eq per year, revised during the technical assessment to an assessed FREL of 5,187,697.6 t CO2 eq per year. The technical assessment states that it represented the historical average of annual CO2 emissions from deforestation, included above-ground biomass and below-ground biomass, excluded deadwood, litter and soil organic carbon, and used a forest definition of at least 0.5 hectares, 10 percent canopy cover and trees capable of exceeding 5 metres in height; exotic and commercial tree plantations were excluded.
