= Cancún safeguards =

UNFCCC social and environmental safeguards for REDD+ adopted at COP 16

The Cancún safeguards are a set of seven social, environmental and governance safeguards adopted under the United Nations Framework Convention on Climate Change (UNFCCC) for REDD+ activities at the 2010 United Nations Climate Change Conference (COP 16) in Cancún, Mexico. The safeguards address topics including forest governance, the rights and participation of Indigenous peoples and local communities, conservation of natural forests and biodiversity, and risks such as reversals and displacement of emissions.

Subsequent UNFCCC decisions developed guidance on how Parties provide information on safeguards implementation, including through a Safeguards Information System (SIS) and periodic Summaries of Information on how the safeguards are being addressed and respected, particularly in connection with access to results-based finance for REDD+. Summaries of Information submitted by Parties are compiled on the UNFCCC Lima REDD+ Information Hub.

== Background and adoption ==
At COP 16, Decision 1/CP.16 (part of the Cancún Agreements) set out a phased approach for REDD+ and requested developing country Parties aiming to undertake REDD+ activities to develop key elements, including a system for providing information on how safeguards are addressed and respected. The same decision also identified governance and social-context issues to be addressed when developing national REDD+ strategies and action plans, including drivers of deforestation and forest degradation, land tenure and forest governance issues, and safeguards.

Policy and academic analyses have examined the safeguards as a do no harm baseline intended to manage risks to rights, governance and environmental integrity in REDD+, and as a means to support co-benefits and confidence in results-based finance. Comparative studies of early national REDD+ policy discourse and pilot projects have found wide variation in how countries translate the broad UNFCCC principles into operational procedures and indicators, with recurring implementation challenges around tenure and rights recognition, meaningful participation and consent, and monitoring of social and biodiversity outcomes.

Appendix I to Decision 1/CP.16 lists seven safeguards and provides that they are to be promoted and supported when undertaking REDD+ activities. Later COP decisions provided guidance on safeguards information through SIS design and the timing, frequency and expected qualities of summaries of information used to communicate how safeguards are being addressed and respected.

UNFCCC negotiation milestones and decision texts relating to REDD+ are compiled on the REDD+ Web Platform.

== The seven safeguards ==
The Cancún safeguards are set out in Appendix I to Decision 1/CP.16 and are to be promoted and supported when undertaking REDD+ activities under the UNFCCC:

1. That actions complement or are consistent with the objectives of national forest programmes and relevant international conventions and agreements.
2. Transparent and effective national forest governance structures, taking into account national legislation and sovereignty.
3. Respect for the knowledge and rights of Indigenous peoples and members of local communities, taking into account relevant international obligations and national circumstances and laws, and noting the adoption of the United Nations Declaration on the Rights of Indigenous Peoples.
4. The full and effective participation of relevant stakeholders, in particular Indigenous peoples and local communities.
5. That actions are consistent with the conservation of natural forests and biological diversity, are not used for the conversion of natural forests, and instead incentivise the protection and conservation of natural forests and their ecosystem services, and enhance other social and environmental benefits.
6. Actions to address the risks of reversals.
7. Actions to reduce displacement of emissions.

Taken together, the safeguards address legal and policy coherence, forest governance, the rights and participation of Indigenous peoples and local communities, conservation of natural forests and biodiversity, and risks to environmental integrity including reversals and displacement of emissions.

== Safeguards information and reporting ==
A safeguards information system (SIS) is the country-level system for providing information on how the Cancún safeguards are addressed and respected throughout the implementation of REDD+ activities. COP guidance provides that an SIS should provide transparent and consistent information that is accessible by relevant stakeholders and updated on a regular basis, be country-driven and implemented at the national level, and build upon existing systems where appropriate.

A summary of information is the periodic communication that presents information on how all the safeguards are being addressed and respected. COP decisions provide guidance on its timing and frequency and on qualities such as transparency, consistency, comprehensiveness and effectiveness.

In decisions on results-based finance for REDD+, the presentation of safeguards-related information (including the most recent summary of information) is listed alongside other methodological elements as part of the information required when seeking results-based support under the UNFCCC framework.

Policy and technical guidance documents discuss SIS design as a country-specific information and reporting arrangement that can draw on existing systems and data sources, while aiming to organise information in a way that supports transparency and review.

== Implementation examples ==
Countries operationalise the Cancún safeguards through national laws, policies and institutions, and by putting in place processes for access to information, stakeholder participation and grievance redress. SIS and summaries of information are then used to organise and communicate how safeguards are being addressed and respected.

In practice, Parties’ summaries of information often map each safeguard to domestic legal and policy frameworks and describe institutional arrangements, consultation processes, and monitoring systems used to generate safeguards-related information. Examples include:

- Indonesia: Indonesia’s safeguards reporting describes a national SIS-REDD+ approach and distinguishes between safeguards being addressed (for example, having relevant policies, institutions and procedures such as grievance mechanisms) and being respected (evidence from implementation that these arrangements function in practice).
- Mexico: Mexico’s second summary of information (covering 2017–2022) describes national and subnational arrangements under its REDD+ strategy, including risk-management instruments and a "Mecanismo de Atención Ciudadana" for complaints and feedback as part of its approach to respecting safeguards.

== Relationship to results-based payments and the Warsaw Framework ==
At COP 19, the Warsaw Framework for REDD+ adopted decisions on results-based finance and related reporting mechanics, including decisions addressing how and when countries present the safeguards summary of information when seeking payments. The UNFCCC REDD+ Web Platform presents safeguards information as part of the broader information set for results-based payments, alongside technical requirements for monitoring, reporting and verification and other methodological elements such as reference levels and national forest monitoring systems.

A review of early experience with REDD+ results-based payments under the Green Climate Fund described the Cancún safeguards as playing a key role in access to results-based finance, and summarised UNFCCC reliance on safeguards information systems and periodic reporting to show that safeguards are being addressed and respected.

In parallel with UNFCCC methodological guidance, financing programmes that support REDD+ (including the Green Climate Fund and the Forest Carbon Partnership Facility) apply their own operational policies and frameworks on environmental and social safeguards when providing readiness support or payments.

== Analysis and implementation issues ==
Analyses have noted that the Cancún safeguards are framed as broad, principle-based requirements at the UNFCCC level, which gives countries flexibility in how safeguards are operationalised and reported through national REDD+ programmes and safeguards information systems. Guidance documents on safeguards information systems emphasise building on existing laws, policies and monitoring systems, which can reduce duplication but may require coordination across institutions and information sources to produce coherent reporting. The extent to which safeguards-related information can be assessed or verified has been debated, including in the context of results-based finance, because UNFCCC decisions specify reporting tools but provide limited methodological guidance on how reported information should be evaluated. Practical guidance for SIS and summaries of information commonly focuses on defining information needs and indicators, clarifying institutional responsibilities, and ensuring that information is accessible to relevant stakeholders and updated regularly.

Safeguards-related guidance has also discussed Free, prior and informed consent (FPIC) as part of approaches to respecting Indigenous peoples' rights and ensuring effective participation in REDD+ decision-making. Academic work has explored ways to operationalise and assess safeguards progress using publicly available social and spatial data (for example in Indonesia).
