= Ibironke Favour Olubamise =

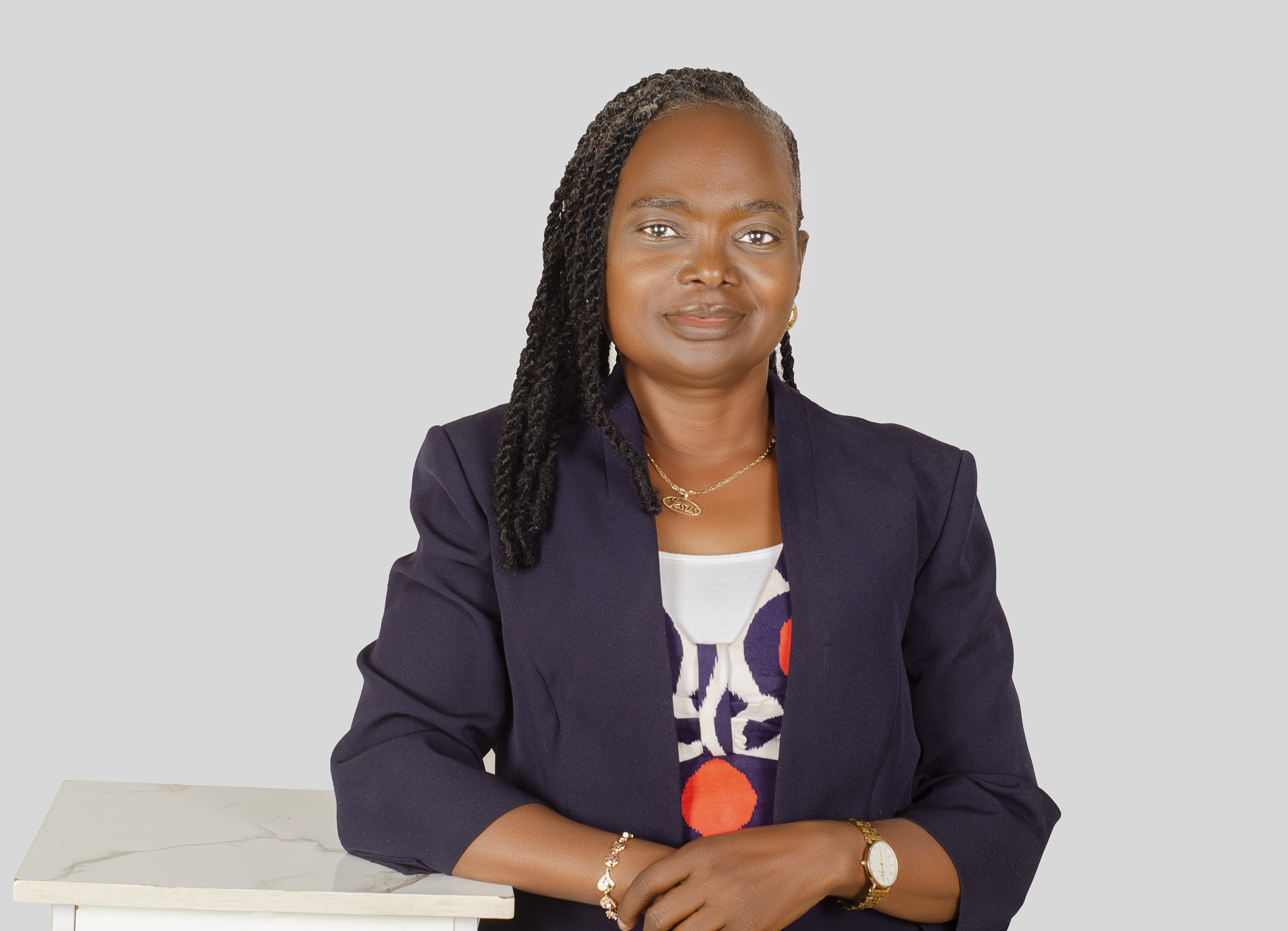
- Citizenship: Nigerian
- Occupation: Environmental activism
- Known for: Climate change and Environmental activism
- Notable work: Catalytic Capital and Indigenous Transition: Rethinking Grant Sustainability through SPENM’s G-L-E Model

Ibironke Favour Olubamise is a climate change activist and the Nigerian Program Coordinator for Global Environmental Facility, Small Grants Programme implemented by the United Nations Development Programme (UNDP). She was the first Nigerian female to head the Technical Program Department of the Nigerian Conservation Foundation (NCF). She later rose to the position of Head of Strategic Operations and the Secretary to the Consultancy Committee of the NCF, National Executive Council.

== Early life and education ==
Ibironke has B.Sc., MSc., MBA, Fellow (LEAD), Chevening Scholar.

== Career ==
Ibironke Favour Olubamise is the National Coordinator of the Global Environmental Facility, Small Grants Programme implemented by the United Nations Development Programme (UNDP) Nigeria.

She is also the National Coordinator of Community-Based UNREDD+ (CBR+). This is a partnership between the UN-REDD Programme and the GEF Small Grants Programme. The grants are given to implement community based environmental initiatives for national and local NGOs, indigenous and community-based organizations, and grassroots organizations through the civil organizations.

The United Nations’ Global Environment Facility (GEF) Small Grant Programme provided about N1.3 billion in 2017. This was to implement environmental projects in Nigeria in eight years. The program was said to aim “supporting environmental initiatives of poor, marginalized and vulnerable communities with emphasis on livelihood enhancement." Ibironke was the National Coordinator for the NGO recipient of the money and stated that the, "programme is focused on Biodiversity, Climate Change, Land Degradation, International Waters and Persistent Organic Pollutants. She listed the beneficiaries to include 500,000 poor rural dwellers and 100 NGOs/CBOs, while 1,000,000 and 10,000 hectares of land have been protected and restored respectively."

In 2018, Ibironke announced that The Global Environmental Facility-Small Grant Programme gave Nigeria a 4.9 million dollars grant to fund 141 environmental related projects in 25 states between 2009 and 2017. She said that "the grant was used to fund projects on biodiversity, climate change, land degradation, persistent organic pollutants and international waters." Also that "800,000 poor rural dwellers, 65 per cent women and 35 per cent men have benefitted directly from the projects."

=== Activities ===
In an interview in Bridging gender gaps key to achieving sustainable environmental solutions in 2025, Ibironke stated that "Women are at the heart of addressing waste management issues, especially plastic pollution. In many homes, women are the primary managers of household waste, and they are often the ones who make decisions about how to dispose of or repurpose materials. This means that women have a crucial role in shaping the culture around waste in their communities."

On another development, Ibironke stated in an interview in Abuja Nigeria on the UNDP support for a healthy environment that the, "UNDP GEF-SGP would continue to create awareness in the country on the dangers of some environmental activities to ensure environmental sustainability." Ibironke also noted that they support community environmental initiatives in five focal areas of the GEF which are biodiversity, climate change, land degradation, chemicals and International waters. The essence of the projects is to educate and inform Nigerians on the benefits in tackling environment issues.

It is said that under her coordinatorship that about 200 teachers and 1000 pupils across Nigeria have been trained on green energy technologies of the United Nations Development Programme, Global Environment Facility, Small Grant Programme (UNDP GEF SGP). According to Ibironke, “projects have adopted the use of Canva for creating infographics, social media posts, and presentations on environmental related climate topics for ease of understanding by the students and teachers. "Students and teachers use videos/YouTube videos during trainings and eco club meetings on how to install simple solar system and others on simple waste recycling techniques. They have also used WhatsApp platform to form a group of all the eco club mentors (Matrons/Patrons) where they share climate and environmental information.”

In 2024, Ibironke was the Keynote speaker at a conference hosted by The Embassy of the Federal Republic of Germany, Abuja, and SustyVibes in Abuja on the programs to conclude the seven-month-long Bioverse NG project. In her speech, she stated that "young people must identify gaps and develop nature-based solutions with economic value."

== Publications ==
Catalytic Capital and Indigenous Transition: Rethinking Grant Sustainability through SPENM's G-L-E Model.

She was one of the contributors of UNDP publication on Small Grant Programme: 25 years of an engagement with indigenous peoples.

She is also a contributing author on the UNDP publication of Community approaches to sustainable land management and agroecology practices.
