= Alexandra Narváez (activist) =

Ecuadorian A'i Cofán environmental and land-rights activist

- Born: Sinangoe, Ecuador (A’i Cofán territory)
- Known for: Indigenous land defence, environmental activism
- Awards: Goldman Environmental Prize (2022)

Alexandra Narváez is an Ecuadorian Indigenous (A’i Cofán) environmental and land-rights activist. In 2022 she received the Goldman Environmental Prize for South and Central America, alongside Alex Lucitante, for leading her community’s successful legal campaign to cancel fifty-two illegal gold-mining concessions in the Cofán territory of Sinangoe, thereby protecting more than 79 000 acres (32 000 ha) of Amazonian rainforest. She is also recognized as the first woman from Sinangoe to join and later lead the community’s Indigenous patrol, known locally as La Guardia, breaking gender barriers in territorial defence.

== Early life and community ==
Narváez was born in the A’i Cofán community of Sinangoe, near the headwaters of the Aguarico River in Ecuador’s northern Amazon region. The Cofán territory, which lies along the foothills of the Andes and encompasses rainforest, riverine, and montane ecosystems, forms a central part of her people’s cultural and ecological heritage. Growing up within this landscape instilled in her a strong sense of responsibility for protecting the forest and waterways that sustain the community.

== Activism and land defence ==
In 2017 Narváez joined the Sinangoe Indigenous patrol La Guardia, created to monitor and resist illegal mining, logging, poaching, and other incursions into Cofán lands. She became the first woman to participate in the group’s activities, challenging long-standing gender norms within her community. The patrol combines traditional territorial knowledge with modern tools such as drones, GPS mapping, and camera traps to document environmental crimes and gather evidence for legal action.

In 2018 the Sinangoe community discovered that the Ecuadorian government had granted fifty-two gold-mining concessions in and around its territory without consultation. Working with fellow leader Alex Lucitante, Narváez helped coordinate a lawsuit against several government agencies, including the ministries of Environment, Energy, Mining, and Water. In October 2018 an Ecuadorian court annulled all of the concessions, ruling that the state had violated constitutional rights to prior consultation, environmental protection, and community health. The decision safeguarded roughly 79 000 acres (32 000 ha) of rainforest around the Aguarico River and set a national precedent for Indigenous territorial rights.

In February 2022 Ecuador’s Constitutional Court reaffirmed and expanded this precedent, holding that Indigenous communities must be granted free, prior, and informed consent (FPIC) before any extractive or development project likely to affect their lands can proceed. The Court further ruled that this obligation applies even to projects located outside Indigenous territories if their impacts extend within them. Narváez and her colleagues have since continued to combine legal strategies with community-based environmental monitoring to defend Cofán ancestral lands from renewed encroachment.

== Recognition and awards ==
In 2022 Narváez and Lucitante were jointly awarded the Goldman Environmental Prize for their leadership in protecting Cofán lands from illegal mining. The award recognised their success in combining grassroots activism, community-based monitoring, and strategic litigation to secure one of the most significant Indigenous environmental victories in Ecuador’s recent history. No reliable, independent sources confirm any additional national or scientific honours attributed to her, and such claims remain unverified.

== Impact and legacy ==
The Sinangoe case has become a landmark for Indigenous rights in Ecuador and Latin America. It established a binding precedent for the application of FPIC and demonstrated the effectiveness of community-led environmental monitoring as a tool for both legal and ecological defence. The Cofán model-integrating traditional patrols with drone surveillance, mapping technologies, and partnerships with environmental organisations-has since been emulated by other Indigenous groups facing threats from mining and deforestation. Narváez’s prominence as a woman leader has inspired a broader movement for gender inclusion within Indigenous governance. Through the Sinangoe women’s association, Shamec’co, she promotes local livelihoods and encourages women’s participation in decisions related to territory, resource management, and cultural preservation. Media coverage frequently highlights her as a symbol of resilience and equality in the struggle for environmental justice and Indigenous sovereignty.

== See also ==
- Goldman Environmental Prize
- Indigenous peoples in Ecuador
- Free, prior and informed consent
