= Sinangoe =

A'i Cofán Indigenous community in the Ecuadorian Amazon

Sinangoe A’i Cofán de Sinangoe
- Indigenous community
- Country: Ecuador
- Province: Sucumbíos
- Canton: Gonzalo Pizarro

Population
  - Total: ~250
- Time zone: ECT

Sinangoe (also called A’i Cofán de Sinangoe) is an Indigenous community of the A’i Cofán people, located in the upper Aguarico River basin in the Sucumbíos Province of Ecuador’s Amazon region. Its territory borders or lies near Cayambe-Coca National Park and Sumaco Napo-Galeras National Park.

== Geography, population, and environment ==
Sinangoe lies in the headwaters of the Aguarico River, one of the tributaries of the Napo River, in a region of rainforest and montane ecosystems. The community comprises about 250 people across several extended families. Its inhabitants depend on subsistence agriculture, fishing, and forest gathering, and increasingly on ecological monitoring and community-based tourism. The territory faces continuing pressure from illegal mining, logging, and riverbed dredging, which degrade vegetation, rivers, and water quality.

== Historical and legal turning points ==
Sinangoe has long resisted extractive encroachment by documenting environmental violations such as illegal mining and poaching. In 2018, community members discovered that the Ecuadorian government had granted 52 gold-mining concessions in and around their ancestral lands without consultation or adequate environmental review. In August 2018, a provincial court suspended the concessions, ruling that the state had violated constitutional rights to free, prior, and informed consultation, and ordered their cancellation. On 16 November 2018, the Provincial Court of Sucumbíos upheld the judgment, confirming that all 52 concessions be annulled and reverted to the State.

On 27 January 2022, Ecuador’s Constitutional Court issued Sentencia No. 273-19-JP/22 following a protection action by the Defensoría del Pueblo and Sinangoe leaders. The Court confirmed violations of constitutional rights including culture, territory, environment, and prior consultation. The ruling affirmed that free, prior, and informed consent (FPIC) must be guaranteed even for projects outside Indigenous territories whose impacts extend within them. The decision is widely cited as the "Sinangoe doctrine" in Ecuadorian environmental and Indigenous jurisprudence.

== Territorial defence and community guard ==
In response to the mining threat, Sinangoe established an Indigenous territorial patrol, La Guardia, around 2017. The guard includes men and women who patrol the forests and rivers using drones, camera traps, GPS, and traditional knowledge to monitor the territory. As of 2024, it was reported that the guard monitors roughly 65,000 hectares of ancestral land. Patrols can last up to two weeks, with camera traps concealed along rivers to detect illegal miners.

== Culture, community organisation, and partnerships ==
Sinangoe is part of a broader network of Cofán communities, some extending into Colombia, collectively managing approximately 100,000 hectares of ancestral territory. The community has collaborated with NGOs and grant programs, such as the 2019 Keepers of the Earth grant used to acquire drones and train Indigenous monitors. The women’s group Shamec’co supports local food production, education, and the preservation of Cofán language and traditions. The Sinangoe rulings are frequently cited in Ecuadorian legal, environmental, and Indigenous rights scholarship as examples of successful community governance and territorial defence.

== Ongoing challenges ==
Despite judicial victories, Sinangoe continues to face incursions by illegal miners and associated deforestation. According to The Guardian, more than 1,600 hectares of Amazon forest were lost to mining in Ecuador in 2023. Community patrols and partnerships remain the main defence mechanism against renewed threats.

== See also ==
- A’i Cofán
- Alexandra Narváez (activist)
- Free, prior and informed consent
- Indigenous peoples in Ecuador
