= Development aggression =

Development aggression is a term used by indigenous peoples to refer to development projects that violate their human rights.

It refers to projects planned or progressed without free, prior and informed consent from an impacted local community as required by international law, such as in the United Nations Declaration on the Rights of Indigenous Peoples.

The term was used as early as 1994 in reporting about international Human Rights Day.

The term was a focus for the 2013 International Day of the World's Indigenous Peoples in some countries. Jill Cariño, convenor of Philippine Task Force for Indigenous Peoples’ Rights said on the day in 2013:

We call to stop any development aggression in our lands and territories as it kills every aspect of our life given by our ancestors that is treasured for the next generations. Our customary laws and governance on our lands and resource use and our inherent right to free, prior and informed consent must be recognized and respect by the government, institutions and companies.
