= Free, prior and informed consent =

Principle on Indigenous involvement in projects

Free, prior and informed consent (FPIC) is aimed to establish bottom-up participation and consultation of an indigenous population prior to the beginning of development on ancestral land or using resources in an indigenous population's territory. Indigenous people have a special connection to their land and resources and inhabit one fifth of the Earth's surface. Such areas are environmentally rich in both renewable and non-renewable resources. The collective ownership style of most Indigenous Peoples conflicts with the modern global market and its continuous need for resources and land. To protect Indigenous Peoples' rights, international human rights law has created processes and standards to safeguard their way of life and to encourage participation in the decision-making process. One such method is the process of FPIC. There is criticism that many international conventions and treaties require consultation, not consent, which is a much higher threshold. Without the requirement for consent, indigenous people cannot veto government projects and developments in their area that directly affect their lives and cultures. FPIC allows Indigenous Peoples to have the right to self-determination and self-governance in national and local government decision-making processes over projects that concern their lives and resources.

Examples include natural resource management, economic development, uses of traditional knowledge, genetic resources, health care, and education.

== Interpretation ==
=== Definition ===
Although there are numerous definitions and debates about FPIC, the United Nations Food and Agricultural Organization has defined the concept of FPIC as the following:

- Free simply means that there is no coercion, conditions, bribery or reward of the indigenous people and that the process is self-directed by those affected by the project.
- Prior implies that consent is sought sufficiently in advance of any activities being either commenced or authorised, and time for the consultation process to occur must be guaranteed by the relative agents.
- Informed suggests that the relevant indigenous people receive satisfactory information on the key points of the project, such as the nature, size, pace, reversibility, and scope of the project as well as the reasons for it and its duration. That is the most difficult term of the four, as different groups may find certain information more relevant. The indigenous people should also have access to the primary reports on the economic, environmental, and cultural impacts that the project will have. The language that is used must be understood by the Indigenous Peoples.
- Consent is not defined but is granted or withheld after a process that involves consultation and participation. However, mere consultation by itself is not a substitute for actual consent. The UN Working Group on Business and Human Rights notes that Indigenous Peoples "should determine autonomously how they define and establish consent."

The UNPFII requires indigenous people should be consulted in a way that is appropriate for their customs. That means that not every member will have to agree, which has been criticised by some women's rights groups. The indigenous people determine who is to be consulted and must effectively communicate that with the government and developers. It is the duty of states to make sure that FPIC has been carried out. Otherwise, it is their issue to redress, not that of the company or the people wishing to carry out the project. The International Labour Organization requires a consultation to take place in a climate of mutual trust, and circumstances are considered appropriate if they create favourable conditions for reaching agreement and consent. In a pilot study by the UN-Reducing Emissions from Deforestation and forest Degradation UN-REDD of FPIC application in Vietnam the following steps were required: (1) preparation, (2) consultation with local officials, (3) recruitment of local facilitators, (4) training of the local facilitators, (5) awareness raising, (6) village meeting, (7) recording the decision, (8) reporting to UN-REDD Vietnam, and (9) verification and evaluation. The majority of issues with the policy was the recruitment of the local facilitators, who were able to discuss the process in a language, but Indigenous Peoples understood there was mistrust towards them and a fear that they had been bribed.

== International development ==
The principle of FPIC within international development is most clearly stated in the United Nations Declaration on the Rights of Indigenous Peoples (UNDRIP). Article 10 states:

Indigenous Peoples shall not be forcibly removed from their lands or territories. No relocation shall take place without the free, prior and informed consent of the Indigenous Peoples concerned and after agreement on just and fair compensation and, where possible, with the option of return.

Articles 11, 19, 28, and 29 of the declaration also explicitly use the term. It is further established in international conventions, notably the ILO Convention 169 on Indigenous and Tribal Peoples. Countries including Peru, Australia, and the Philippines have included FPIC in their national law.

== Criticism and challenges ==
Although FPIC is protected under international law, State domestic policies often work around the consent aspect, understanding it as a negotiation process, rather than a process of internal self-determination. Industry representatives argue that the FPIC framework, particularly the consent part, allows Indigenous peoples to stop development projects that could benefit public interests and economic growth. The counter argument to this however, is that extraction for corporate profit reproduces neocolonial legacies.

Another critique is that the FPIC framework threatens state sovereignty by giving decision-making powers of land to communities and Indigenous peoples. The counter argument to this point out how Federal systems and decentralized governance already share decision-making powers, explaining how Indigenous governance can also exist within multiple levels of authority. Additionally, Scholars argue that Indigenous sovereignty already existed before state sovereignty, explain how Indigenous communities has had, and still has, long-standing authority over their land. The FPIC doesn't create indigenous power, it protects the power that has already existed long before state control.

== International law ==
The role of Indigenous Peoples' FPIC in decisions about infrastructure or extractive industries developed on their ancestral domain is an issue in international law. Projects lacking FPIC are called development aggression by Indigenous Peoples, whose lack access to accountability and grievance mechanisms to address human rights violations have been formally raised with the United Nations Human Rights Council. Asian Indigenous Peoples urged the UN to address the issue before the economic integration of ASEAN in 2015, because of the human rights records of member states such as Myanmar and Laos, which are among the world's most repressive societies.

=== International Labour Organization ===
The International Labour Organization (ILO) has been working with indigenous people since the 1920s and currently has 187 member states, including New Zealand. ILO Convention 169 (the Convention) on indigenous and tribal peoples is an international treaty adopted by the ILO in 1989. The Convention aims to overcome discriminatory practices affecting indigenous people and enable them in the decision-making process. The fundamental foundations of the Convention are participation and consultation. The requirement for consultation falls upon the government of the state and not on private persons or companies and may be delegated, but the ultimate responsibility rests on the government. The need for consultation of IPs is written throughout the Convention a number of times and is referred to in Articles 6, 7, 16 and 22. Article 6(1) states that governments should:

“Consult the peoples concerned, through appropriate procedures and in particular through their representative institutions, whenever consideration is being given to legislative or administrative measures which may affect them directly" '

Article 6 (2) states that the consultation will be carried out in good faith and in a form that is appropriate to the circumstances. The aim of the consultation process is to achieve an agreement or consent to the purposed development. The Convention does not allow indigenous people to veto any development since the condition is for consultation, not consent. The supervisor bodies of the ILO have stated that the consultation process cannot be mere information-sharing and that there must be a chance for the indigenous people to influence the decision-making process. If consent is not achieved, the nation-state must still respect other areas of the convention that include the Indigenous Peoples' right to their lands. For example, Article 16 (2) requires that free informed consent must be given if is the relocation of people. The treaty is legally binding on all states that ratify it, which may need to adjust domestic legislation. In nations such as New Zealand, domestic legislation such as the Resource Management Act 1991 refers to the need to consider in developments Maori relationship with land and water sites. The spiritual and practical connection that Maori have to the land has been considered in a number cases before the court including the Supreme Court case Paki v Attorney General.

=== United Nations ===
The United Nations describes FPIC both directly and indirectly in numerous conventions and treaties. One of the most direct cases is the United Nations Declaration on the Rights of Indigenous Peoples (UNDRIP), Article 19 states:

"States shall consult and cooperate in good faith with the Indigenous Peoples concerned through their own representative institutions in order to obtain their free, prior and informed consent before adopting and implementing legislative or administrative measures that may affect them."

Article 32 requires consultation to be carried out with Indigenous Peoples before states can undertake projects that will affect their rights to land, territory and resources Those articles require consultation, but Article 10 requires also informed consent before the relocation of Indigenous Peoples from their land. That allows indigenous people the right to decide where they live and gives them the power stop any development that they oppose.

The Universal Declaration of Human Rights (UDHR) is the most universally accepted standard of human rights. It does not directly mention FPIC but it does express the importance of self- determination of all peoples in Article 1. Also, Article 7 declares that all are equal before the law, which means that one person has no more right to another in a nation. The principle is further endorsed by Article 17, which states that every person has the right to own property and shall not be arbitrary deprived of property. The right for self-determination is further protected in the International Covenant on Civil and Political Rights (ICCPR) and the International Covenant on Economic, Social and Cultural Rights (ICESCR) in Article 1 of both documents and includes economic self-determination, which for many IP is the control of their natural resources.

The ICCPR in Article 27 states that minorities shall not be denied access to their culture. In the Human Rights Committee (HRC) in General Comment 23, that was found to include the right of indigenous people to their land and resources. The HRC has interpreted that to mean that states have a positive duty to engage with IP prior to any development or granting of resource concession in IP lands.

The Committee on Economic, Social and Cultural Rights (CESCR), the supervisory body of the ICESCR, has even stated in General Comment No. 23 that if indigenous people's land has been taken without informed prior consent, they have the right to restitution or the return of their land or resources. That comes from its interpretation of Article 15 of the ICESCR . Article 15 protects indigenous people's right to participate in their cultural life. The comment by the CESCR is important as it goes beyond mere consultation. The need for FPIC has also been called upon by the Committee on the Elimination of Racial Discrimination (CERD) which requires that no state shall make a decision concerning the rights of IP without their consent. The Convention on the Elimination of All Forms of Racial Discrimination (CERD) encourages indigenous people's participation in decision making. However, they are not legally-binding decisions but only recommendations

=== World Bank ===
The World Bank was one of the first multilateral financial institutions to create guidelines to protect the rights of Indigenous Peoples in the 1980s, when it recognized that development negatively impacted their lives and cultures. Its first policy was in 1987 and was designed by staff without consultation of Indigenous People and was a statement on the need to protect Indigenous Peoples. In 1991, its Operational Directive 4.20 document acknowledged the need for participation of indigenous people in the consultation process.

The subsequent World Bank Policy on Indigenous Peoples was released in 2005, OP 4.10 focused on the reduction of poverty. In doing so, the bank identified the intrinsic link that Indigenous People have with the land and the need for a consultation process which fully respects the human rights, human dignity, economics and culture of the people involved. It stated that it will not lend money to a state or company unless there has been free prior informed consultation with the local indigenous population and that there is broad community support for the development.

Critics have questioned for the term "consultation" to be used as opposed to consent and state that to mean that IP cannot decline a project if they do not agree with it. Furthermore, "community" is an ambiguous term.

In August 2016, the World Bank adopted its new Environmental and Social Standards, including Environmental and Social Standard 7 (ESS7) on Indigenous Peoples/Sub-Saharan African Historically Underserved Traditional Local Communities (Indigenous Peoples, "IPs"), which requires free prior informed consent if the project will:

- have adverse impacts on land and natural resources subject to traditional ownership or under customary use or occupation;
- cause relocation of IPs from land and natural resources subject to traditional ownership or under customary use or occupation; or
- have significant impacts on IPs'cultural heritage that is material to the identity and/or cultural, ceremonial, or spiritual aspects of the affected IPs' lives.

== Indigenous Peoples' FPIC protocols ==
Since the early 2000s, Indigenous Peoples have started developing their own protocols on how FPIC processes are to be carried out. The first protocols were sector specific, namely Canadian First Nations addressing the country's mining companies, the second wave of protocols were so-called bio-cultural protocols developed by Indigenous Peoples i.a. in Asia and Africa in connection with the implementation of Article 8j on Access and Benefit Sharing of the Convention on Biological Diversity. The third generation are so-called autonomous FPIC protocols that have predominantly been developed by Indigenous Peoples in Latin American countries, such as the Wampis in Peru, the Juruna in Brazil or the Embera Chami in Colombia, whose states have, despite ratifying ILO Convention 169, adopted regulations that fall far short of FPIC as defined in international law.

== Climate change negotiations ==
During the UNFCCC climate change negotiations on reducing emissions from deforestation and forest degradation (REDD+), it was noted that the United Nations General Assembly had adopted UNDRIP, meaning that the Declaration and its FPIC provision applied to the negotiations. This reference was made in the context of a so-called safeguard for REDD+, specifically the instruction to have "respect for the knowledge and rights of Indigenous Peoples and members of local communities" when undertaking REDD+ activities.

Following this, FPIC has been widely applied for demonstration projects on REDD+, particularly after the United Nations REDD Programme published a report on its efforts to develop a methodology for FPIC for REDD+ in the case of its country program in Vietnam. Early in 2013, the global United Nations REDD Programme issued guidelines for the application of FPIC, including an analysis of jurisprudence on FPIC in various contexts, that are mandatory for all UN-REDD country programmes.

== National legislation ==
Some countries have incorporated FPIC into national legislation, the first being the Philippines: Indigenous Peoples' Rights Act of 1997.

=== Bolivia ===
Bolivia ratified ILO Convention 169 and in 2007 also formally incorporated UNDRIP into its municipal law. In 2009, the nation also included the duty to consult Indigenous Peoples in its constitution but in a much less radical version of the draft, which required consent for the exploration of all resource activities. The legal requirements are very significant in a nation that has a wealth of natural resources and a large indigenous population. The risk of giving indigenous people a veto on government projects is an increase social conflict in certain regions. That was seen with the conflict surrounding the Isiboro Se´cure National Park and Indigenous Territory (TIPNIS). A road was planned through the park, and coca growers were for the project as it would expand their business. The indigenous population opposed the idea and said that consent should be needed for mega development in indigenous territories. The result was large protests in La Paz for fear of damage to the vital river system, illegal logging, and the alteration of the habitats of endangered animals in the area. The state engaged in consultation with the Indigenous Peoples, but that worsened the problem, with activists criticized the government's lack of legal framework to protect indigenous people. The government claimed that indigenous expectations of were unrealistic.

== See also ==
- Informed consent
- Research ethics
- Declaration on the Rights of Indigenous Peoples
- Human Rights
- Indigenous land rights
