= United Nations REDD Programme =

United Nations programme supporting REDD+

United Nations Programme on Reducing Emissions from Deforestation and Forest Degradation
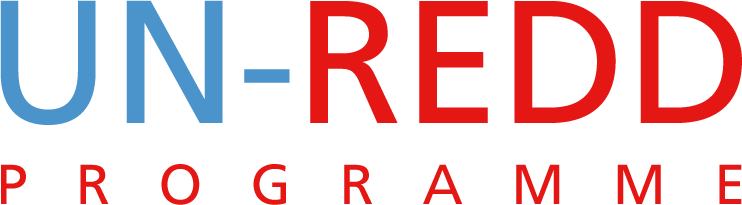

- UN-REDD National Programmes UN-REDD Partner Countries
- Established: September 24, 2008; 18 years ago
- Headquarters: Geneva, Switzerland
- Members: 65 Partner Countries
- Head, UN-REDD Programme Secretariat: Mario Boccucci
- Parent organization: Food and Agriculture Organization (FAO), United Nations Development Programme (UNDP), United Nations Environment Programme (UNEP)
- Website: www.un-redd.org

The United Nations Programme on Reducing Emissions from Deforestation and Forest Degradation (UN-REDD Programme) is a joint programme of the Food and Agriculture Organization (FAO), the United Nations Development Programme (UNDP) and the United Nations Environment Programme (UNEP) that works with partner countries on technical and institutional preparation for implementing REDD+.

Established in 2008, the programme operates through a trust fund that pools voluntary donor contributions for REDD+ readiness and related support. In its 2022 annual report, UN-REDD reported 65 partner countries, including 23 in Africa, 20 in Asia-Pacific, and 22 in Latin America and the Caribbean.

Work described by the programme includes support for national REDD+ strategies and institutions, development of forest monitoring systems and measurement, reporting and verification (MRV), and work on safeguards and stakeholder participation mechanisms, including processes involving indigenous peoples, local communities and civil society.

== History ==
UN-REDD was created in 2008 following UNFCCC decisions on the Bali Action Plan and negotiations on REDD at COP 13. It has operated through a trust fund established in 2008 to pool donor contributions for programme activities.

UN-REDD forms part of a wider set of international initiatives that developed to provide frameworks or funding for REDD+ readiness, alongside efforts such as the World Bank's Forest Carbon Partnership Facility.

By 2022, UN-REDD reported 65 partner countries spanning Africa, Asia-Pacific and Latin America and the Caribbean.

== Mandate and scope ==
UN-REDD describes its mandate as supporting nationally led REDD+ processes and encouraging stakeholder participation, including by indigenous peoples and other forest-dependent communities.

The programme's 2016–2020 Strategic Framework set an overall goal of reducing emissions from forests and enhancing forest carbon stocks, linked to national sustainable development.

=== Relationship to REDD+ under the UNFCCC ===
REDD+ is a voluntary climate change mitigation approach developed by Parties to the UNFCCC. UN-REDD is a multilateral programme that supports developing countries in establishing the technical capacities used in REDD+ readiness and implementation, including capacities linked to UNFCCC requirements for results-based payments.

=== Related initiatives ===
In addition to UN-REDD, initiatives assisting countries engaged in REDD+ include the World Bank's Forest Carbon Partnership Facility, Norway's International Climate and Forest Initiative, the Global Environment Facility, Australia's International Forest Carbon Initiative, the Collaborative Partnership on Forests, and the Green Climate Fund.

== Governance ==
UN-REDD is implemented jointly by FAO, UNDP and UNEP. Programme documents describe governance arrangements intended to include partner countries and donors alongside representation from Indigenous peoples and civil society organizations, alongside the participating UN agencies.

=== Executive Board ===
The UN-REDD Programme Executive Board provides overall oversight and makes decisions on allocations from the UN-REDD Programme Fund. It meets bi-annually, or more frequently as required.

=== Assembly ===
The UN-REDD Programme Assembly is a multi-stakeholder forum for consultation and exchange among programme stakeholders, governed by organizations such as the United Nations, and the World Bank.

=== National Steering Committees ===
National Steering Committees support country ownership and coordination of National REDD+ Programmes and may include representatives of civil society and indigenous peoples. Programme documents describe these committees as providing oversight and addressing changes in national programme implementation.

=== Multi-Party Trust Fund Office ===
The Multi-Party Trust Fund Office provides funding administration for the UN-REDD Programme.

In addition, it also provides financial transparency reports, releases funding to appropriate and participating UN agencies such as the FAO, UNDP and UNEP and manages donor contributions to support financial flow.

== Funding and donors ==
UN-REDD is financed through voluntary contributions to the UN-REDD Programme Fund. Donors have included the European Union and the governments of Denmark, Japan, Luxembourg, Norway, the Republic of Korea, Spain, Switzerland, the United Kingdom and others. As of 31 December 2023, Norway had contributed US$313,708,254.07 of US$377,696,356.05 in total donor contributions to the UN-REDD Programme Fund.

REDD+ financing has evolved into large scale funding as result of the international carbon market and it's newfound and greater reliance on public and bilateral funding primarily provided by governments and international donors. The slow development of the global carbon market under the United Nations Framework Convention on Climate Change has attributed to the changing shifts of bilateral funding. To combat this issue, countries such as Norway, Germany and the United Kingdom have provided bilateral funding opportunities to many foreign governments, including Brazil, Guyana and Indonesia. However, this raises concerns for the future financing of REDD, its long-term sustainability, and the financial risks associated with ongoing bilateral agreements.

== Strategy and results frameworks ==
=== 2016–2020 Strategic Framework ===
In collaboration with FAO, UNDP and UNEP, the UN-REDD Programme developed the 2016-2020 Strategic Framework that introduced the M&E structure and "theory of change" model, which linked the programme input to long term REDD+ objectives.

The UN-REDD Programme's 2016–2020 Strategic Framework set out an overall goal and organised programme work around three outcomes and associated outputs, alongside cross-cutting themes including stakeholder engagement, forest governance, tenure security and gender equality.

=== 2021–2025 results framework and strategy to 2030 ===
In 2020, the UN-REDD Executive Board adopted a results framework for 2021–2025.

Terms of reference for the UN-REDD Programme Fund (extended on 30 August 2023) set out a longer-term strategy to 2030 organised around four outcomes: realising forest solutions, rewarding forest solutions, enhancing forest solutions, and connecting actors and knowledge for forest solutions. The same terms of reference describe the 2021–2025 results framework as structured around outputs intended to support annual work plans and budgets and monitoring and reporting on programme implementation.

== Workstreams ==
=== Readiness support to partner countries ===
Readiness support to partner countries has combined direct funding with technical assistance to governments designing and implementing national REDD+ programmes. UN-REDD has also provided targeted assistance for specific national REDD+ actions and supported capacity-building activities such as methodological guidance, tools and data support, and exchanges among partner countries.

=== Forest monitoring and MRV ===
UN-REDD support has included assistance aimed at developing or strengthening forest monitoring and measurement, reporting and verification (MRV) capacity for REDD+ readiness and implementation. UN-REDD has been identified in comparative research as one of several initiatives contributing to MRV institutionalisation in countries including Indonesia, Peru and Tanzania.

In its 2022 annual report, UN-REDD described the UNFCCC Warsaw Framework on REDD-plus as comprising national strategies or action plans, forest reference emission levels or forest reference levels, national forest monitoring systems with MRV, and safeguards information systems, and stated that it supports partner countries in establishing or improving these elements.

=== Safeguards and stakeholder engagement ===
Work on safeguards and stakeholder engagement forms part of UN-REDD's readiness support. The programme describes its approach as including stakeholder participation in REDD+ processes, including by indigenous peoples and other forest-dependent communities.

A programme overview covering 2008–2013 linked UN-REDD safeguards work to the UNFCCC safeguards agreed at COP16 in Cancun (see Cancún safeguards), including provisions on respecting the rights of indigenous peoples and local communities and ensuring their participation. UN-REDD has also stated that it supports partner countries in establishing or improving safeguards information systems so that social and environmental considerations are addressed in REDD+ implementation.

Participation mechanisms have included representation of civil society organizations and indigenous peoples in UN-REDD deliberations and support for national-level structures intended to enable engagement of civil society and indigenous peoples in REDD+ decision-making in partner countries.

The programme has produced guidance and tools on safeguards and participation, including Social and Environmental Principles and Criteria, and has supported partner countries in developing grievance redress mechanisms. UN-REDD has also developed guidance related to free, prior and informed consent (FPIC), a consent-based process discussed in safeguards guidance as a way for affected indigenous peoples and local communities to make informed decisions about whether and how to participate in REDD+ activities.

However, research has demonstrated that verifying compliance of participating countries is often labor and resource intensive. Finance programs indicate that countries face significant technical and financial burdens to prove their compliance with the given rules of REDD+. Data monitoring that tracks social and environmental impacts requires large scale operations that are often lagging, cutting into seemingly guaranteed funding opportunities.

== Activities and outputs ==
=== Publications ===
UN-REDD has stated that it publicly releases an annual programme progress report and a semi-annual report.

The UN-REDD progress and semi-annual reports consist of technical documents and policies that report on issues such as indigenous participation, government frameworks, accessibility mechanisms and benefits proctored by the programme, including informed consent (FPIC) and analyses of REDD+ implementation.

UN-REDD publications in recent years have included regional and national case studies that examine land use practices and effectiveness of REDD+ framework to effectively understand the capacity required to achieve current climate goals.

=== Country-level examples ===
Examples of UN-REDD readiness support documented in government and third-party reporting and published literature include:

- Democratic Republic of the Congo: In the Democratic Republic of the Congo, UN-REDD supported forest monitoring and inventory readiness work, including training forest inventory teams and preparatory inventory activities, and supported the development of plans for a national forest monitoring system. UN-REDD also supported work on national social and environmental standards within the REDD+ process.
- Indonesia: In Indonesia, UN-REDD supported capacity building linked to forest monitoring for REDD+, including work connected to forest inventory data management systems used in MRV workflows.
- Viet Nam: In Viet Nam, UN-REDD supported the development of national or sub-national guidance related to free, prior and informed consent (FPIC) as part of safeguards and participation work for REDD+ readiness, alongside programme-level FPIC guidance.
- Papua New Guinea: In Papua New Guinea, UN-REDD supported the development of national or sub-national FPIC guidance in connection with safeguards and stakeholder engagement in REDD+ readiness support.
- Nepal: In Nepal, REDD+ has co-collaborated and launched pilot projects with local forest management programs to demonstrate how community participation can reduce emissions and lead to sustainable forestry.

The UN-REDD Programme in partnership with UNEP-WCMC has also supported and integrated ecosystem planning into REDD+ policies in countries such as Ecuador, Cambodia, Peru and Kenya.

== Reporting and transparency ==
UN-REDD publishes programme reports and makes information about fund administration available through the Multi-Partner Trust Fund Office and its online collaborative workspace.

The UN-REDD programme also pushes transparency of REDD+ implementation through development of national forest monitoring systems (NFMS) and verification frameworks such as MRV, that aid countries to quantify their carbon emissions for technical reviews and reports.

== Reception and evaluations ==
In 2014, an external evaluation of UN-REDD covering programme activities from June 2008 through the end of 2013 rated the programme's strategic relevance as satisfactory. The evaluation noted achievements in technical areas such as forest monitoring and MRV, as well as stakeholder engagement and national-level governance systems, but reported that national programme countries were not progressing as planned and that the time and resources required for REDD+ readiness had been underestimated; it rated output delivery as moderately satisfactory and programme effectiveness as moderately unsatisfactory.

The evaluation reported weak country ownership overall, including limited involvement from policy-makers, non-forest ministries and the private sector, and noted potential efficiency gains through stronger joint programming with other REDD+ initiatives, including the World Bank's Forest Carbon Partnership Facility. Recommendations included clarifying the programme's theory of change, prioritising support to national programmes, and adopting a staged and country-driven approach to national programme implementation.

A joint audit issued in 2015 by internal audit services of FAO, UNDP and the UN Office of Internal Oversight Services reviewed interagency implementation and coordination and reported overlap between UN-REDD activities and those of other REDD+ implementing partners and funding sources. The audit recommended clearer guidance on the scope and boundaries of the programme and its relationship to other major REDD+ undertakings, as well as clearer principles for resource allocation and improvements to programme performance measurement.

== Criticism and challenges ==
Independent and stakeholder commentary on REDD+ readiness has included debate over how free, prior and informed consent (FPIC) should be applied in practice, including distinctions between consultation (seeking input) and consent (agreement) and whether FPIC should entail a veto over proposed activities.

Some indigenous rights advocates have criticised draft FPIC guidance where they considered it insufficiently protective. In comments on draft UN-REDD FPIC guidance, the Indian Law Resource Center argued that FPIC processes should meet international human rights standards and protect indigenous peoples' rights, and recommended strengthening the draft guidance accordingly.

In the Nigeria-REDD programme funded through UN-REDD, a case study in Conservation and Society argued that representation and participation mechanisms were often symbolic rather than substantive, and recommended stronger inclusion of elected local government authorities in participatory processes intended to safeguard local interests.

Evaluations and audits of UN-REDD have also identified implementation challenges, including underestimation of the time and resources required for REDD+ readiness, constraints related to country ownership and implementation capacity, and the need to clarify programme scope in relation to other REDD+ initiatives and funding sources.

== See also ==
- Forest Carbon Partnership Facility – World Bank facility supporting REDD+ readiness and forest carbon finance
