= Dispute mechanism =

A dispute mechanism is a structured process that addresses disputes or grievances that arise between two or more parties engaged in business, legal, or societal relationships. Dispute mechanisms are used in dispute resolution, and may incorporate conciliation, conflict resolution, mediation, and negotiation.

Otherwise known as grievance mechanisms, dispute mechanisms are typical non-judicial in nature, meaning that they are not resolved within the court of law. According to research produced by the non-judicial grievance mechanism task force of John Ruggie, Special Representative of Business and Human Rights to the United Nations, those who design and oversee non-judicial mechanisms should acknowledge core human rights processes defined by "all core UN human rights treaties.”

Dispute mechanisms comprise a way for socially responsible businesses to meet requirements of corporate responsibility-related agreements or pacts, reduce risk while capacity-building or developing internationally, and assist larger processes that create positive social change.

Dispute mechanisms are an increasingly effective tool for establishing communication channels between businesses and communities. When successful, they offer a trusted way for local peoples or communities to voice and resolve concerns related to development projects, while providing companies with transparent, effective ways to address community concerns. According to a publication by the Compliance Advisor/Ombudsman of the World Bank Group, "locally-based grievance resolution mechanism(s) provide a promising avenue by offering a reliable structure and set of approaches where local people and the company can find effective solutions together." Generally, it is agreed that a well-functioning grievance mechanism should:

- Provides a predictable, transparent, and credible process to all parties, resulting in outcomes that are seen as fair, effective, and lasting
- Builds trust as an integral component of broader community relations activities
- Enables more systematic identification of emerging issues and trends, facilitating corrective action and preemptive engagement.

== Characteristics ==
According to the Business and Human Rights SRSG, such mechanisms must at a minimum be:

- Legitimate: a mechanism must have clear, transparent and sufficiently independent governance structures to ensure that no party to a particular grievance process can interfere with the fair conduct of that process;
- Accessible: a mechanism must be publicized to those who may wish to access it and provide adequate assistance for aggrieved parties who may face barriers to access, including language, literacy, awareness, finance, distance, or fear of reprisal;
- Predictable: a mechanism must provide a clear and known procedure with a time frame for each stage and clarity on the types of process and outcome it can (and cannot) offer, as well as a means of monitoring the implementation of any outcome;
- Equitable: a mechanism must ensure that aggrieved parties have reasonable access to sources of information, advice and expertise necessary to engage in a grievance process on fair and equitable terms;
- Rights-compatible: a mechanism must ensure that its outcomes and remedies accord with internationally recognized human rights standards;
- Transparent: a mechanism must provide sufficient transparency of process and outcome to meet the public interest concerns at stake and should presume transparency wherever possible; non-State mechanisms in particular should be transparent about the receipt of complaints and the key elements of their outcomes.

== Types ==
- Industry
- Company
- Legislative
- Government
- Non-Governmental
- Independent State-based
- International Organization
- Multi-Stakeholder

== Uses ==
Well-designed grievance mechanisms have multiple and sometimes divergent points of application, but are typically used by monitoring, auditing, project oversight, supply chain management, and stakeholder engagement. Grievance mechanisms can deal with most kinds of grievances (bar those raising criminal liability), including – but by no means limited to – those that reflect substantive human/labour rights concerns. As such, rights-compatible mechanisms must work to integrate human rights norms and standards into their processes and are based on principles of non-discrimination, equity, accountability, empowerment and participation.

== See also ==
- Arbitration
- Dispute resolution
- Mediation
- Ombudsman
- ADR
