= Forest Carbon Partnership Facility =

World Bank facility supporting REDD+ readiness and forest carbon finance

- Abbreviation: FCPF
- Established: 2008
- Type: Partnership / trust-fund facility (REDD+ readiness and results-based payments)
- Headquarters: World Bank (Trustee and host of the FCPF Secretariat)
- Region served: Global
- Members: Developing-country participants, donor participants, and stakeholder observers represented through the Participants Committee
- Governing body: Participants Committee (PC)
- Secretariat: Facility Management Team (FMT)
- Fund Manager: Andres Espejo
- Parent organization: World Bank
- Website: www.forestcarbonpartnership.org

The Forest Carbon Partnership Facility (FCPF) is a World Bank facility that supports developing countries in preparing for and implementing REDD+. It operates through trust funds administered by the International Bank for Reconstruction and Development (IBRD) as trustee and is intended to support both REDD+ readiness activities and pilot approaches to results-based finance for emission reductions from the forest sector.

The facility has two main windows: a Readiness Fund focused on supporting readiness preparation and implementation, and a Carbon Fund intended to pilot results-based payments for verified emission reductions from the forest sector.

== History ==
The World Bank’s board approved the Forest Carbon Partnership Facility in 2007 as part of the Bank’s carbon-finance activities, with an “official launch” planned for December 2007 during the UN climate conference in Bali (COP 13). The facility was designed as a partnership to help developing countries prepare for a future system of incentives to reduce emissions from deforestation and forest degradation, combining readiness support with a results-based finance window.

The facility began operating in 2008, with early governance decisions taken by the Participants Committee, including resolutions that set out aspects of facility governance and operations. The facility’s operating framework was subsequently consolidated in the Charter Establishing the Forest Carbon Partnership Facility, which defines the facility’s objectives, participation structure and the arrangements for its Readiness Fund and Carbon Fund windows.

In January 2013, additional donor funding of about US$180 million was announced for the facility’s forest carbon funds, described as increasing total resources to roughly US$650 million, including support for its Carbon Fund window.

== Mandate and scope ==
Under the Charter, the FCPF is intended to assist eligible REDD country participants in developing capacity for strategic planning and implementation of REDD+, and to test approaches to performance-based payments for emission reductions in the forest sector.

Participation in the Readiness Fund and Carbon Fund is governed through standard legal agreements. For example, REDD country participation in the Readiness Fund is governed through REDD Country Participation Agreements between the participating country and IBRD as trustee, while Carbon Fund contribution arrangements are governed through Carbon Fund participation agreements and supplementary agreements for additional contributions.

== Governance and structure ==
The Charter describes governance arrangements centred on participant decision-making bodies and a management function hosted by the World Bank, alongside trustee arrangements for the Readiness Fund and Carbon Fund.

The Charter establishes a Participants Assembly that meets annually and provides general guidance, and a Participants Committee that meets at least twice per year and takes decisions on matters such as selection of REDD country participants and approval of budgets and work plans for the Readiness Fund. The Charter describes decision-making rules for the Participants Committee, including efforts to reach consensus, quorum requirements, and voting procedures if consensus is not reached.

=== Transparency, observers and participation ===
The Charter provides for observer participation in Participants Committee meetings and describes categories of observers, including representatives of forest-dependent Indigenous peoples and forest dwellers and representatives of non-governmental organisations, alongside other observer categories described in the Charter.

A published selection process for an NGO observer describes how civil society organisations may select an NGO observer and alternate through a nomination and voting process intended to support liaison between the observer and wider civil society networks engaging with the facility.

The Charter also includes provisions on disclosure of potential conflicts of interest by Participants Committee members and procedures where a potential conflict exists.

== Funding and donors ==
The facility’s financial structure includes separate trust-fund arrangements for the Readiness Fund and the Carbon Fund, with contributions governed by participation agreements and related instruments. The Charter also describes Carbon Fund governance through Carbon Fund Meetings and notes that the Carbon Fund may be organised in tranches, each established as a separate trust fund under the facility’s framework.

Implementation may involve delivery partners under transfer agreements that set out terms for fund transfers and operational requirements, including agreements between IBRD as trustee of the Readiness Fund and partner organisations such as the United Nations Development Programme (UNDP).

The FCPF is financed through voluntary contributions from donor participants, administered as two separate World Bank trust funds aligned with its two main windows (the Readiness Fund and the Carbon Fund). A World Bank project paper described the facility as a partnership between forested developing-country participants and financial contributors from the public and private sectors.

In a 2012 Independent Evaluation Group (IEG) global program review covering the facility’s early years, donor participants were reported to have pledged hundreds of millions of US dollars to the Readiness Fund, with a smaller number of donors accounting for a large share of contributions. Donor participants listed in the same review included Agence Française de Développement (AFD) and the governments of Australia, Canada, Denmark, Finland, Germany, Italy, Japan, the Netherlands, Norway, Spain, Switzerland, the United Kingdom and the United States.

Contributions to the Carbon Fund were made by public-sector participants (including the European Commission and several governments) and, in the facility’s early years, also included a smaller number of private-sector and NGO participants. Private-sector participation in the Carbon Fund has been limited relative to expectations in the early period.

== Workstreams and mechanisms ==
The FCPF operates through two trust-fund windows designed to support countries at different stages of REDD+ implementation: a Readiness Fund that supports preparation for a national REDD+ approach, and a Carbon Fund that pilots results-based finance linked to verified emission reductions from the forest sector.

=== Readiness Fund ===
The Readiness Fund supports REDD+ readiness by helping participating countries plan and build the institutional, policy and technical foundations needed to implement REDD+ at scale. As part of this process, countries typically consolidate proposed readiness activities and arrangements in a Readiness Preparation Proposal (R-PP), including elements such as consultation and participation planning, institutional responsibilities, and technical approaches that underpin REDD+ implementation. Readiness submissions and subsequent updates are considered through facility review and decision-making processes, with documented assessments used to summarise key issues raised during review and to inform next steps for country readiness work.

Readiness activities may be supported through a delivery-partner model, in which partner institutions assist countries in implementing readiness work under the facility’s operational and reporting arrangements.

=== Carbon Fund ===
The Carbon Fund is intended to pilot results-based payments for emission reductions from the forest sector, linking finance to quantified performance by eligible forest emission-reduction programmes rather than treating readiness planning as the endpoint. Programmes seeking Carbon Fund finance are expected to meet methodological and accounting requirements, alongside social and environmental considerations relevant to results-based payments, as reflected in the Carbon Fund’s methodological framework.

Results-based payments under the Carbon Fund are linked to reported emission-reduction outcomes that are subject to independent validation and verification before payments are made, with verification findings used in the facility’s results-based payment process.

=== Carbon Fund methodological and verification guidance ===
For the Carbon Fund, methodological requirements and accounting approaches are set out in the Carbon Fund Methodological Framework. The facility has also published validation and verification guidelines for assessments linked to Carbon Fund activities.

=== Policies and safeguards ===
The FCPF adopted a "Common Approach" to environmental and social safeguards for implementation involving multiple delivery partners, intended to harmonise safeguard requirements for readiness activities supported through the facility.

The facility has also used guidance on stakeholder engagement in REDD+ readiness, including guidance developed jointly with the UN-REDD Programme that focuses on participation processes involving Indigenous Peoples and other forest-dependent communities.

== Activities and country engagement ==
Under the Charter, Readiness Fund support is linked to readiness preparation and implementation processes described in facility documentation, while the Carbon Fund is intended to support results-based approaches for forest-sector emission reductions under Carbon Fund arrangements and related agreements.

=== Country examples ===
==== Ghana ====
In Ghana, World Bank implementation reporting for the Ghana Emissions Reductions Program describes preparation and early implementation work linked to a jurisdictional emissions-reduction programme in cocoa-forest landscapes, including development of programme instruments such as a benefit-sharing plan and Monitoring, reporting and verification (MRV) arrangements. The programme was selected into the FCPF Carbon Fund and an Emission Reductions Payment Agreement (ERPA) was signed under the Carbon Fund framework, reflecting the facility’s approach of linking payments to verified emission-reduction performance rather than readiness planning alone.

Independent stakeholder-engagement guidance prepared for the programme has emphasised consultation and safeguards considerations in cocoa landscapes, including clarity on rights and benefit-sharing expectations among smallholder farmers and forest-dependent communities.

==== Democratic Republic of the Congo ====
In the Democratic Republic of the Congo, the FCPF Carbon Fund engaged with the Mai Ndombe Emission Reductions Program through a purchase/sale arrangement for verified emission reductions generated under the programme, illustrating the facility’s results-based contracting model at programme scale. Under the Carbon Fund’s framework, programme transactions are linked to reported emission-reduction outcomes that are subject to independent validation and verification before results-based payments are made, and require documented social and environmental management arrangements relevant to performance-based finance.

Independent policy analysis has highlighted that jurisdictional REDD+ programmes in the DRC operate in a context of longstanding governance and land-tenure constraints, which can complicate implementation, enforcement and benefit-sharing even where programme-level safeguards are specified.

==== Laos ====
Country-level research on Laos has analysed how REDD+ readiness processes linked to the FCPF Readiness Fund and subsequent preparation for results-based finance interacted with domestic forest zoning and land governance, reporting stakeholder concerns about participation and timing pressures in advancing REDD+ planning and technical work. Related analysis of REDD+ policy “translation” in Laos has described how competing storylines and administrative dynamics shaped how readiness outputs were framed and operationalised, affecting perceptions of inclusion and accountability in the readiness process.

==== Dominican Republic ====
FCPF readiness review materials for the Dominican Republic illustrate the facility’s assessment process for country readiness submissions and follow-up documentation, using published assessment notes to summarise key issues raised in review and recommended next steps for readiness work. More broadly, a 2012 Independent Evaluation Group global program review of the facility’s early period highlighted that readiness grant disbursement was slow and that implementation capacity constraints shaped the pace at which country readiness outputs translated into implementation, providing context for the facility’s early country pipelines across regions.

== Results and evaluations ==
=== Evaluations ===
Independent evaluation work commissioned in the facility’s early years found that the FCPF had made significant progress on objectives related to providing financial and technical assistance for REDD+ readiness and disseminating knowledge, while progress on piloting performance-based payments and on livelihood and biodiversity objectives was at an earlier stage.

A 2012 Independent Evaluation Group global program review described the FCPF as an early platform for operationalising REDD+ readiness, including through international deliberations that produced detailed guidance and templates used by countries to develop readiness strategies, and through associated stakeholder-engagement guidance such as the Strategic Environmental and Social Assessment (SESA).

The same review also highlighted constraints affecting performance and expectations in the first years of implementation, including uncertainty about the prospects for a large-scale compliance market for REDD+ credits, limited private-sector participation in the Carbon Fund at the time, high demand from participating countries relative to available implementation capacity, and slow disbursement of Readiness Fund grants in the early period.

=== Independent analysis ===
Independent scholarship discussing REDD+ institutions has described the FCPF (alongside the UN-REDD Programme) as one of the major multilateral platforms created to operationalise REDD+ through readiness support and pilot results-based payment arrangements.

A comparative governance study of international REDD+ “institutional elements” included the FCPF among the support and funding agencies assessed, using multi-year stakeholder survey research to examine perceived governance quality (such as participation, accountability and transparency) across institutions rather than treating the FCPF solely as a funding vehicle.

Country-level case studies have also examined how engagement with the FCPF Readiness Fund and subsequent preparation for the FCPF Carbon Fund can shape national REDD+ policy processes. In Laos, for example, published research analysed how FCPF-linked REDD+ processes interacted with domestic forest zoning and land governance, and reported stakeholder concerns about participation and timing pressures associated with preparing for results-based finance.

== Criticism and challenges ==
Civil society organisations have at times raised concerns about how Carbon Fund decisions are made and how social and environmental risks are handled in higher-risk contexts, including questions about whether safeguards, participation and land-tenure issues are adequately addressed before results-based finance is advanced for pilot programmes.

== Relationship to other REDD+ initiatives ==
The FCPF operates within a wider international architecture of REDD+ readiness support and forest-climate finance, alongside other multilateral initiatives that focus on building national strategies, institutions and measurement systems for REDD+ implementation, such as the UN-REDD Programme and the Forest Investment Program (FIP) of the Climate Investment Funds.

FCPF readiness processes have been used in parallel with UN-REDD support in a number of partner countries, and the initiatives have aligned parts of their readiness approach through shared tools and guidance. This included a joint FCPF/UN-REDD template for Readiness Preparation Proposals (R-PPs) and joint guidance on stakeholder engagement in REDD+ readiness.

For results-based finance, the FCPF Carbon Fund is one of several public mechanisms intended to link payments to verified emission-reduction outcomes from the forest sector. Comparative overviews of REDD+ finance discuss the Carbon Fund alongside other results-based initiatives and funds, including the World Bank's BioCarbon Fund and the Green Climate Fund’s REDD+ results-based payments pilot.

Donor governments have supported REDD+ through both multilateral channels (including the FCPF and other multilateral REDD+ funds) and bilateral programmes, which has shaped how countries combine readiness support and results-based finance across initiatives.

== See also ==
- UN-REDD Programme
- REDD+
