= Warsaw Framework on REDD-plus =

UNFCCC decision package on REDD-plus adopted at COP 19

The Warsaw Framework on REDD-plus (also called the Warsaw Framework for REDD-plus) is a package of decisions on REDD+ adopted by the Conference of the Parties (COP) to the United Nations Framework Convention on Climate Change (UNFCCC) at its nineteenth session (COP 19) in Warsaw, Poland, in November 2013. Seven COP 19 decisions (Decisions 9-15/CP.19) form the core of the framework, complemented by three related decisions adopted at COP 21 in 2015 (Decisions 16-18/CP.21).

The framework provides methodological guidance and related institutional arrangements for implementing REDD+ activities by developing countries, including national forest monitoring systems, forest reference emission levels and forest reference levels, safeguards information, and monitoring, reporting and verification (MRV), as well as procedures for assessment and analysis of reported information that support results-based finance. Under the Paris Agreement, Article 5 encourages Parties to implement and support the existing REDD+ framework under the convention, including results-based payments for verified reductions in greenhouse gas emissions and forest-related removals. The Intergovernmental Panel on Climate Change (IPCC) has identified the Warsaw Framework among the elements that link REDD+ implementation to access to results-based finance.

== Background ==
REDD+ refers to actions in developing countries to reduce emissions from deforestation and forest degradation and to support conservation, sustainable management of forests, and enhancement of forest carbon stocks. Earlier COP decisions established core elements of REDD+ implementation, including national strategies or action plans, reference levels, national forest monitoring systems, and safeguards. The Warsaw decisions added procedures for assessing submitted reference levels, analysing reported results and related information, and publishing information on results and payments through UNFCCC systems used for results-based finance.

== Adoption at COP 19 ==
At COP 19, Parties adopted Decisions 9-15/CP.19, which are commonly grouped as the Warsaw Framework on REDD-plus. The Earth Negotiations Bulletin summary report listed the Warsaw REDD+ framework among the conference outcomes on land use and forests.

== Decisions and content ==
The COP 19 decisions cover both arrangements for results-based finance and technical guidance for measuring and reporting REDD+ outcomes. At a high level, the decisions address:

- Decision 9/CP.19 - results-based finance and an online information hub for REDD+ results and payments.
- Decision 10/CP.19 - coordination of support for implementation of REDD+ activities and related institutional arrangements.
- Decision 11/CP.19 - modalities for national forest monitoring systems used to measure and track forest-related emissions and removals.
- Decision 12/CP.19 - timing and frequency for presenting a summary of information on how REDD+ safeguards are addressed and respected.
- Decision 13/CP.19 - guidelines and procedures for technical assessment of proposed forest reference emission levels and/or forest reference levels.
- Decision 14/CP.19 - modalities for measuring, reporting and verifying REDD+ outcomes, including technical analysis of reported information.
- Decision 15/CP.19 - encouragement to address drivers of deforestation and forest degradation in implementing REDD+ activities.

National forest monitoring systems are intended to provide data and information suitable for MRV, while MRV covers the broader measurement, reporting, and verification requirements for results and related information. Provision of safeguards-related information is part of the requirements associated with access to results-based payments, while safeguards implementation is carried out through national frameworks and procedures.

== Later decisions and relation to UNFCCC reporting ==
=== COP 21 additions ===
COP 21 adopted Decisions 16-18/CP.21, which complement the COP 19 decisions and add guidance on alternative policy approaches, non-carbon benefits, and safeguards-related matters.

- Decision 16/CP.21 - alternative policy approaches, including joint mitigation and adaptation approaches for forests
- Decision 17/CP.21 - non-carbon benefits associated with REDD+ activities
- Decision 18/CP.21 - safeguards and related guidance on safeguards information

=== Reporting and transparency after the Paris Agreement ===
Processes established under the Warsaw Framework, including technical assessment of reference levels and technical analysis of reported results, continue to operate through UNFCCC reporting arrangements after the adoption of the Paris Agreement, alongside the encouragement of implementation and support under Article 5.

== Reception and analysis ==
Legal analysis published soon after COP 19 described the Warsaw package as clarifying several methodological requirements for REDD+ implementation. The same analysis argued that uncertainty about the scale and predictability of results-based finance remained a constraint on participation and implementation. Later analysis of REDD+ finance and governance has similarly emphasized ongoing challenges in mobilising and coordinating results-based finance alongside the framework's technical requirements.
