= REDD+ =

Climate change mitigation policy

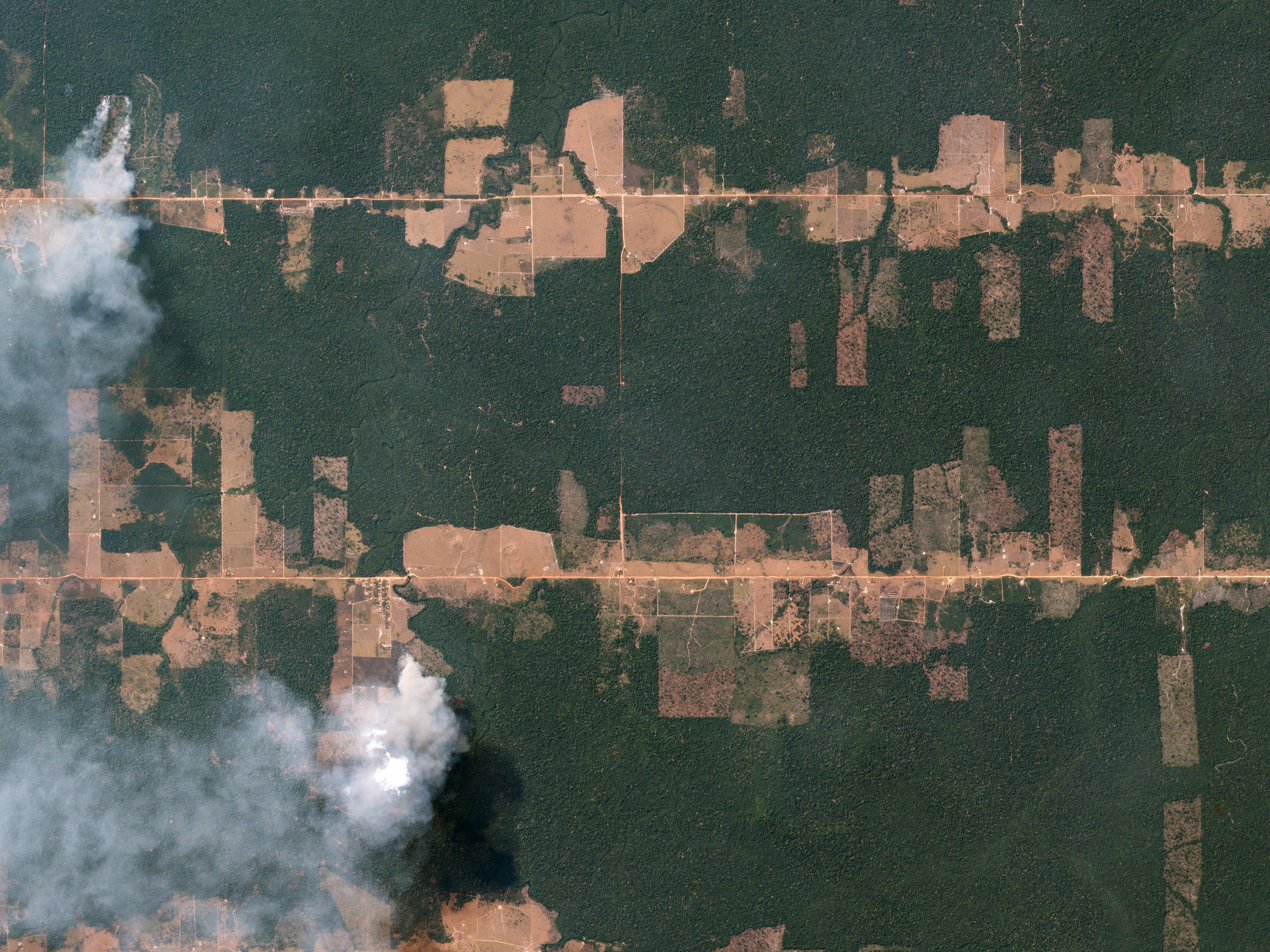
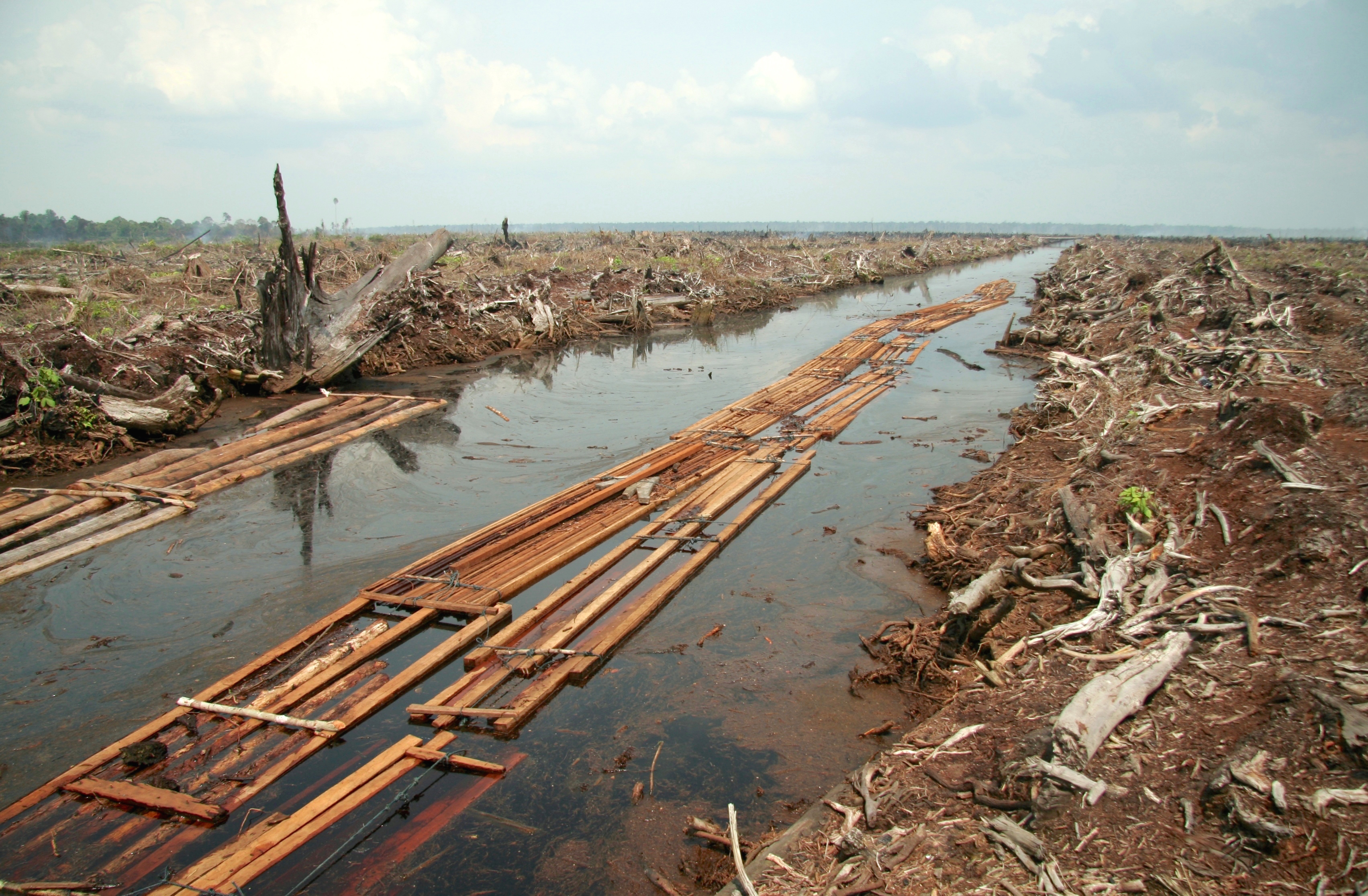
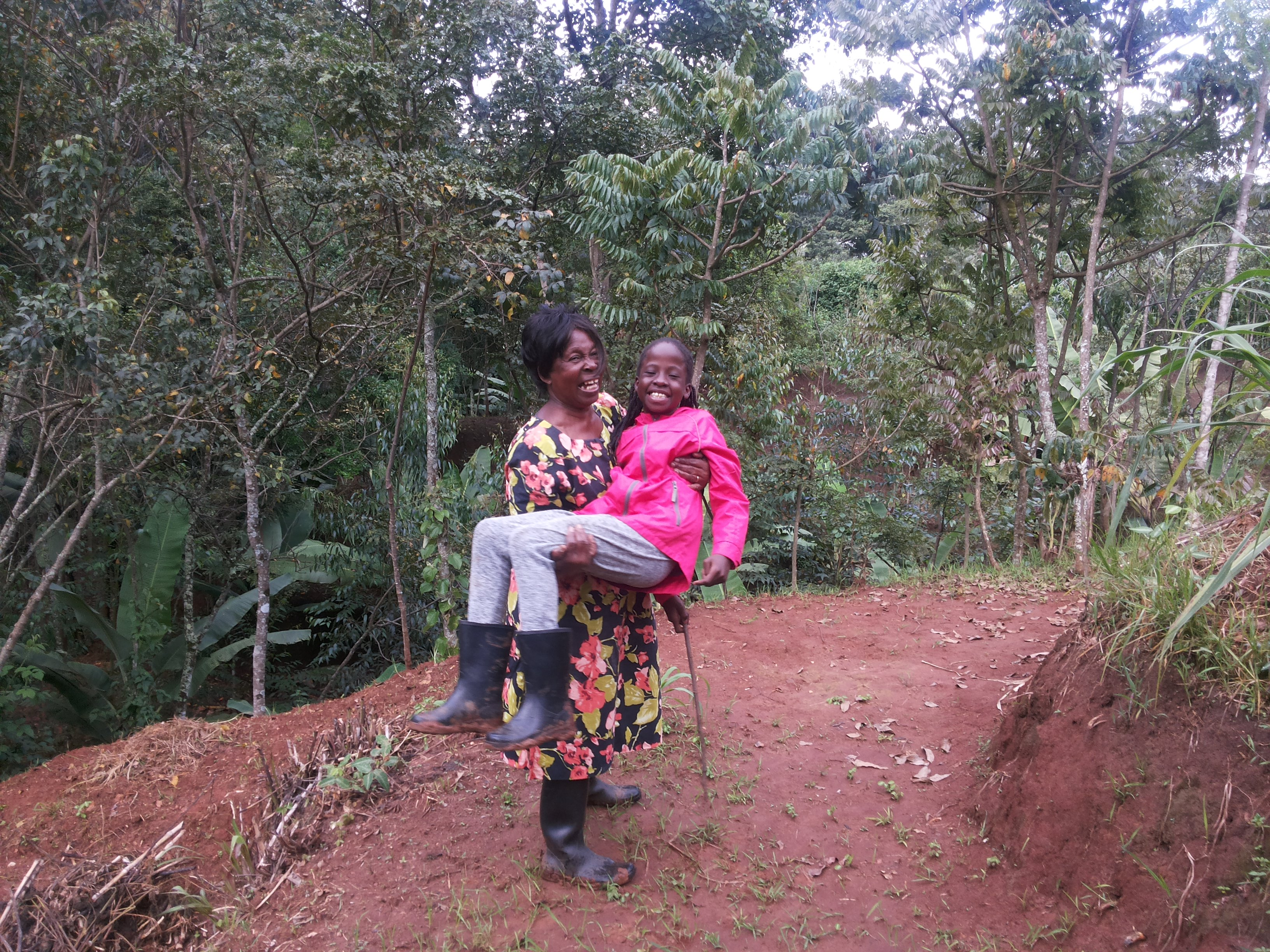
Examples of issues addressed by REDD+ in tropical forest landscapes: large-scale deforestation visible from space (top), conversion of carbon-rich peat forests for agriculture such as oil-palm (left), and community-based efforts to reduce forest degradation by creating income incentives for conservation (right).

REDD+ is a voluntary climate change mitigation framework developed under the United Nations Framework Convention on Climate Change (UNFCCC). It aims to encourage developing countries to reduce greenhouse gas emissions from deforestation and forest degradation, and to promote conservation, sustainable forest management, and enhancement of forest carbon stocks through financial incentives and policy support. The acronym is commonly expanded as "reducing emissions from deforestation and forest degradation in developing countries", and the "+" denotes the additional forest conservation and enhancement activities included in the UNFCCC scope.

UNFCCC decisions describe REDD+ as a phased approach, beginning with "readiness" activities (planning, capacity-building and institutional development), moving to implementation of national policies and measures, and evolving toward results-based actions that are fully measured, reported and verified. Countries undertaking REDD+ are expected to develop a national strategy or action plan, establish a forest reference (emission) level (FREL/FRL) as a benchmark for assessing performance, and build a national forest monitoring system to support monitoring, reporting and verification (MRV). UNFCCC decisions also include social and environmental safeguards (often referred to as the Cancún safeguards) and require countries seeking results-based payments to provide information on how safeguards are addressed and respected.

REDD+ is supported through a mix of multilateral and bilateral channels and can receive results-based finance when reported results meet UNFCCC methodological and transparency requirements under the Warsaw Framework on REDD-plus. A 2024 multi-country impact evaluation reported modest average forest outcomes and limited average welfare effects, with impacts not always sustained over time. Reviews and methodological assessments highlight uncertainties in baselines (reference levels), additionality, leakage, non-permanence and measurement capacity, especially for forest degradation and carbon pools that are harder to quantify. Criticisms and controversies also focus on governance and equity issues, including land tenure and carbon rights, benefit sharing, and the participation and consent of Indigenous peoples and local communities, alongside broader debates over the role of forest offsets in climate policy.

REDD+ remains an active part of the UNFCCC and Paris Agreement architecture. Most of the core UNFCCC decisions that define REDD+ were adopted between 2010 and 2015, including the Warsaw Framework on REDD-plus (2013). Countries continue to report REDD+ results through technical annexes to developing-country reports, including under the Paris Agreement's enhanced transparency framework via technical annexes to biennial transparency reports (BTRs). Results-based finance also continues through multilateral channels such as the Green Climate Fund's REDD+ results-based payments window.

== Background ==
=== Climate change mitigation context ===
Deforestation and forest degradation are major sources of greenhouse gas emissions, although their share of global emissions depends on accounting choices (for example, whether net land-use change fluxes that include forest regrowth are used). In 2019, the IPCC estimated net emissions from the Agriculture, Forestry and Other Land Use (AFOLU) sector at about 13 GtCO_{2}-eq (about 22% of global net anthropogenic greenhouse gas emissions), and reported that about half of net AFOLU emissions were net CO_{2} emissions from land use, land-use change and forestry (LULUCF), predominantly from deforestation. Reducing emissions from deforestation and forest degradation is estimated to be one of the most cost-efficient climate change mitigation strategies. Regeneration of forest on degraded or deforested lands can remove CO_{2} from the atmosphere through the build-up of biomass, making forest lands a sink of greenhouse gases.

==== Reducing emissions ====
Emissions of greenhouse gases from forest land can be reduced by slowing down the rates of deforestation and forest degradation, covered by REDD+ eligible activities. Another option would be some form of reduced-impact logging in commercial logging, under the REDD+ eligible activity of sustainable management of forests.

==== Enhancing removals ====
Removals of greenhouse gases (specifically CO_{2}) from the atmosphere can be achieved through various forest management options, such as replanting degraded or deforested areas or enrichment planting, but also by letting forest land regenerate naturally. Care must be taken to differentiate between what is a purely ecological process of regrowth and what is induced or enhanced through some management intervention.

=== History ===
==== Terminology ====
The UNFCCC workstream is commonly referred to as "reducing emissions from deforestation and forest degradation", abbreviated as REDD+. In formal UNFCCC agenda items and decision titles, the Conference of the Parties (COP) has often spelled out the scope rather than relying on an acronym, while "REDD+" is widely used as shorthand in UNFCCC materials and the wider literature.

The original submission by Papua New Guinea and Costa Rica, on behalf of the Coalition for Rainforest Nations, dated 28 July 2005, was entitled "Reducing Emissions from Deforestation in Developing Countries: Approaches to Stimulate Action". COP 11 entered the request as agenda item 6: "Reducing emissions from deforestation in developing countries: approaches to stimulate action".

As negotiations progressed, UNFCCC titles expanded from a focus on deforestation toward a broader scope that also covered forest degradation and the roles of conservation, sustainable management of forests and enhancement of forest carbon stocks.

The set of decisions on REDD+ adopted at COP 19 in Warsaw (2013) is collectively known as the Warsaw Framework on REDD-plus, a label introduced in a footnote to the titles of the decisions. In common usage:

- REDD originally referred to "reducing emissions from deforestation in developing countries" (as in the 2005–2007 agenda wording).
- REDD+ (or REDD-plus) is used for the broader scope that includes reducing emissions from deforestation and forest degradation, and the role of conservation, sustainable management of forests, and enhancement of forest carbon stocks in developing countries.

Most of the key REDD+ decisions were completed by 2013, with the final pieces of the UNFCCC rulebook finished in 2015.

==== REDD (2005–2007) ====
REDD was first discussed in 2005 under the UNFCCC at its 11th session of the Conference of the Parties after Papua New Guinea and Costa Rica, on behalf of the Coalition for Rainforest Nations, submitted the proposal on reducing emissions from deforestation in developing countries.

In December 2007, after a two-year debate on the proposal, Parties at COP 13 agreed to explore approaches to reduce emissions from deforestation and to enhance forest carbon stocks in developing nations. The underlying idea was to provide positive incentives for reducing deforestation by assigning value to forest carbon. Early discussions often framed this as "avoided deforestation" (AD), and later broadened the scope to include forest degradation (REDD).

Policy debates included whether REDD should be financed through market mechanisms (tradable credits) or through non-market, fund-based approaches. Assessments also noted that implementation would require expanded scientific and regulatory capacity to quantify forest carbon, manage land use, and demonstrate emissions trends.

==== REDD+ (scope expands) ====
Over time, UNFCCC decisions broadened the scope from deforestation alone to include forest degradation and the roles of conservation, sustainable management of forests, and enhancement of forest carbon stocks in developing countries—activities commonly associated with the "+" in REDD+.

===== Bali Action Plan (2007) =====
REDD received substantial attention at COP 13 (Bali, 2007), where decision 2/CP.13 encouraged demonstration activities and called for assessment of drivers of deforestation. REDD+ was also referenced in decision 1/CP.13, the "Bali Action Plan", with reference to the range of activities later associated with REDD+ (including conservation, sustainable management of forests and enhancement of forest carbon stocks).

The call for demonstration activities was followed by the creation of programmes and projects, including the Forest Carbon Partnership Facility (FCPF) of the World Bank, the UN-REDD Programme, and a range of bilateral initiatives. These initiatives drew on evolving UNFCCC guidance for REDD+.

==== Rulebook development (2009–2015) ====
From 2009 onward, UNFCCC decisions progressively set out methodological guidance and institutional requirements for REDD+. At COP 15 (2009), decision 4/CP.15 provided more substantive methodological guidance and encouraged development of national strategies, capacity, and reference levels, alongside participatory approaches involving Indigenous peoples and local communities.

At COP 16 (2010), decision 1/CP.16 set out the broader REDD+ scope and introduced social and environmental safeguards (the Cancún safeguards), alongside expectations for national forest monitoring and phased implementation. At COP 17 (2011), decision 12/CP.17 provided additional guidance on safeguard information and reference level modalities.

At COP 19 (2013), seven decisions collectively known as the Warsaw Framework on REDD-plus addressed results-based finance; coordination of support; modalities for national forest monitoring systems; presenting information on safeguards; technical assessment of reference levels; and MRV modalities. The remaining outstanding decisions on REDD+ were completed at COP 21 (2015), and Parties were encouraged to implement and support REDD+ in Article 5 of the Paris Agreement.

== Framework ==
=== Phased approach ===
Decision 1/CP.16, paragraph 73, suggests that national capacity for implementing REDD+ is built up in phases, "beginning with the development of national strategies or action plans, policies and measures, and capacity-building, followed by the implementation of national policies and measures and national strategies or action plans that could involve further capacity-building, technology development and transfer and results-based demonstration activities, and evolving into results-based actions that should be fully measured, reported and verified". The initial phase of developing national strategies, action, and capacity building is typically referred to as the "readiness phase".

=== Core elements ===
UNFCCC decisions describe a set of core elements for developing countries undertaking REDD+ activities, including a national strategy or action plan; a forest reference emission level and/or forest reference level (FREL/FRL) as a benchmark; a national forest monitoring system to support MRV; and a system for providing information on how safeguards are addressed and respected. Parties are also asked to address the drivers of deforestation and forest degradation, as well as issues such as land tenure and forest governance, stakeholder participation, and gender considerations, in national strategies or action plans.

=== Eligible activities ===
The five eligible activities of REDD+ are:

(a) Reducing emissions from deforestation.
(b) Reducing emissions from forest degradation.
(c) Conservation of forest carbon stocks.
(d) Sustainable management of forests.
(e) Enhancement of forest carbon stocks.

Together, these categories cover actions that reduce emissions by avoiding loss of forest area (deforestation) or declines in forest condition (degradation), as well as actions that maintain existing forest carbon stocks through conservation and manage forests to sustain carbon stocks while providing other outputs. "Enhancement of forest carbon stocks" covers activities intended to increase the amount of carbon stored in forests over time.

=== Policies and measures ===
REDD+ is implemented primarily through national "policies and measures", such as laws, regulations, enforcement and incentive programmes that shape land use and forest management. Because the main drivers of deforestation and forest degradation often sit outside the forest sector (especially agricultural expansion, infrastructure and extractive activities), effective REDD+ strategies typically combine forest-sector measures (for example, improved forest governance, protected-area management, or improved logging practices) with cross-sector reforms such as land-use planning and agricultural policy.

UNFCCC decisions ask countries to assess national circumstances and the drivers of deforestation and forest degradation and to address them through policies and measures in national strategies or action plans, including governance, land tenure and stakeholder participation considerations. Negotiating texts also acknowledge that development and poverty eradication priorities shape how Parties balance forest protection with other objectives.

=== Reference levels ===
In REDD+, a forest reference emission level (FREL) and/or forest reference level (FRL) serves as a benchmark against which later reported forest-related emissions and removals are compared when assessing results. In general terms, FRELs are commonly framed around emissions from deforestation and forest degradation, while FRLs may also incorporate removals where the "+" activities are included, although terminology and practice vary across countries and submissions. For use under the UNFCCC in connection with results-based payments, reference levels are submitted and undergo a technical assessment, and countries may update them over time using a stepwise approach as data and methods improve.

=== Monitoring, reporting and verification ===
In REDD+, MRV refers to quantifying forest-related emissions and removals, documenting methods and results transparently, and subjecting reported information to technical analysis under UNFCCC procedures. UNFCCC guidance links MRV to the development of a national forest monitoring system (NFMS), which typically combines remote sensing with ground-based observations such as forest inventories to generate information used for reporting.

REDD+ results are reported through technical annexes to developing-country reports under the UNFCCC, and the reported information is then subject to technical analysis coordinated by the UNFCCC Secretariat. Under the Paris Agreement's enhanced transparency framework, the UNFCCC notes that technical analysis of REDD+ results reported in a technical annex to a biennial transparency report takes place alongside the technical expert review.

Rather than approving or rejecting results, the technical analysis focuses on methodological consistency and transparency (including consistency with the assessed reference level) and identifies areas where methods and data could be improved.

=== Safeguards ===
REDD+ negotiations raised concerns that forest-based mitigation could create social harms (for example through weak governance or insecure land tenure) or environmental harms (for example through conversion of natural forests or displacement of deforestation). The UNFCCC therefore adopted a set of seven Cancún safeguards at COP 16, which Parties are asked to promote and support when implementing REDD+ activities. The safeguards address legal and policy coherence and transparent forest governance; respect for the rights and knowledge of Indigenous peoples and local communities and their full and effective participation; conservation of natural forests and biodiversity and enhancement of other social and environmental benefits; and risks to environmental integrity including reversals and displacement of emissions (leakage).

Under the Warsaw Framework on REDD-plus, developing countries seeking results-based payments are expected to maintain a system for providing information on how safeguards are addressed and respected (often referred to as a safeguard information system, SIS) and to provide a periodic "summary of information" describing their implementation of the safeguards. Safeguard implementation guidance has also discussed Free, prior and informed consent (FPIC) as part of approaches to respecting Indigenous peoples' rights and ensuring effective participation in REDD+ decision-making.

Reviews note that safeguards are framed in broad terms at the UNFCCC level, leaving significant discretion to countries in how they are interpreted, monitored and reported, and that institutional capacity and data availability can shape the credibility and comparability of safeguards information.

== Finance and carbon markets ==
=== International climate finance ===
In 2009, at COP 15 in Copenhagen, the Copenhagen Accord was reached, noting in section 6 the recognition of the crucial role of REDD and REDD+ and the need to provide positive incentives for such actions by enabling the mobilization of financial resources from developed countries. The Accord goes on to note in section 8 that the collective commitment by developed countries for new and additional resources, including forestry and investments through international institutions, will approach US$30 billion for the period 2010-2012.

The Green Climate Fund (GCF) was established at COP 17 to function as the financial mechanism for the UNFCCC, thereby including REDD+ finance. The Warsaw Framework on REDD-plus makes various references to the GCF, instructing developing country Parties to apply to the GCF for result-based finance. The GCF currently finances REDD+ programs in phase 1 (design of national strategies or action plans, capacity building) and phase 2 (implementation of national strategies or action plans, demonstration programs). It has also supported results-based payments: a pilot programme for REDD+ results-based payments ran from 2017 to 2022, and in October 2024 the GCF Board adopted a policy establishing REDD+ results-based payments as a permanent funding window within the Fund.

=== Voluntary carbon market ===
Alongside UNFCCC-linked REDD+ finance, many forest-carbon projects described as "REDD+" have been developed for the voluntary carbon market. In these project-based approaches, emissions reductions are quantified under independent crediting standards (commonly the Verified Carbon Standard, and projects may also seek certification for social and biodiversity co-benefits under standards such as the Climate, Community & Biodiversity Standards.

=== Aviation offsets (CORSIA) ===
REDD+ is not automatically eligible for inclusion under CORSIA; airlines may use only carbon credits that ICAO lists as "CORSIA eligible emissions units", subject to ICAO's eligibility criteria and any programme-, unit-, vintage- and host-country authorization restrictions intended to avoid double-claiming.

== Implementation ==
REDD+ is implemented primarily through national policies and institutions, supported by international finance and technical assistance. In parallel, a separate ecosystem of project-based initiatives has developed in voluntary carbon markets, which operates under independent crediting standards rather than UNFCCC accounting rules.

=== National implementation ===
In UNFCCC decisions, REDD+ is implemented as a phased approach: countries start with readiness activities, move to implementing national policies and measures, and then report results-based actions that are measured, reported and verified. National implementation typically involves developing a national strategy or action plan; addressing key drivers of deforestation and forest degradation through policies and measures; and building the institutional capacity to track forest change and implement safeguards, often through a national forest monitoring system and related MRV arrangements.

A central technical step is establishing a forest reference (emission) level (FREL/FRL) as a benchmark against which reported results are assessed. Countries seeking results-based payments are also expected to provide information on how safeguards are addressed and respected, alongside their reported results.

=== Readiness and support channels ===
REDD+ readiness (often described as phase 1) refers to early institutional and technical work needed before results-based implementation, including developing national strategies or action plans, building MRV capacity, establishing forest reference levels, and putting in place safeguard-related processes and stakeholder participation arrangements.

International support for readiness has been delivered through multilateral and bilateral channels, including technical assistance and finance for strategy development, consultation processes, monitoring systems, and safeguards frameworks.

==== UN-REDD Programme ====
The UN-REDD Programme, established in 2007 by UNDP, UNEP and FAO, provides technical assistance and capacity-building to partner countries for REDD+ readiness and implementation.

==== Forest Carbon Partnership Facility ====
The World Bank's Forest Carbon Partnership Facility (FCPF) has supported readiness preparation and capacity-building, including support for national strategy development, stakeholder consultation, reference level development, national forest monitoring systems and safeguards analysis. The FCPF also established a Carbon Fund intended to support implementation through payments for verified emissions reductions under national or subnational programmes.

==== Bilateral technical and financial support ====
Bilateral initiatives have also supported REDD+ readiness and implementation, including programmes that link finance to policy reforms, monitoring capacity and, in some cases, reported results. For example, Norway announced its Norwegian International Climate and Forest Initiative (NICFI) at the 2007 Bali conference and has supported national and regional forest and climate programmes, including support linked to Brazil (via the Amazon Fund) and initiatives in other forest regions. The United States launched the SilvaCarbon initiative as a technical cooperation effort to strengthen tropical countries' capacity for forest monitoring and greenhouse-gas measurement.

=== Results-based payments and reporting mechanics ===
Under the UNFCCC, results-based finance is linked to quantified results that are measured, reported and technically assessed against an assessed FREL/FRL, alongside information on safeguards. In practice, this requires (among other elements) a national forest monitoring system and MRV procedures, documented methods and data, and reporting through the UNFCCC processes established under the Warsaw Framework on REDD-plus.

Results-based payments may be provided through multiple channels, including multilateral climate finance mechanisms. For example, the Green Climate Fund has supported REDD+ readiness and implementation activities and has also made results-based payments through a pilot programme and a subsequent policy establishing REDD+ results-based payments as a permanent funding window within the Fund.

=== Project-based voluntary carbon market initiatives ===
Alongside UNFCCC-linked REDD+ finance, many forest-carbon projects described as "REDD+" have been developed for the voluntary carbon market. In these project-based approaches, emissions reductions are quantified under independent crediting standards (commonly the Verified Carbon Standard), and projects may also seek certification for social and biodiversity co-benefits under standards such as the Climate, Community & Biodiversity Standards. Because these projects are credited under private standards rather than assessed against national FREL/FRL benchmarks, project-level methodologies and baseline choices play a central role in how outcomes are estimated and credited.

== Outcomes and effectiveness ==
The outcomes of REDD+ are assessed in two main ways: (1) country-reported results under the UNFCCC, where quantified emissions reductions and removals are compared to an assessed forest reference (emission) level and may be rewarded with results-based finance; and (2) project-based activities developed for the voluntary carbon market, where third-party standards quantify and verify claimed emissions reductions and issue tradable credits. These two streams are related but not directly comparable: UNFCCC reporting is anchored in national reference levels and UNFCCC technical processes, whereas voluntary market crediting is based on project-level baselines and private standard methodologies.

Under the Warsaw Framework for REDD+, developing countries seeking results-based payments are expected to have an assessed FREL/FRL, to report quantified results (typically via a technical annex in UNFCCC reporting), and to undergo technical analysis under the International Consultation and Analysis process. REDD+ continues to receive results-based finance from multiple channels, including the Green Climate Fund, which ran a pilot programme for REDD+ results-based payments (2017-2022) and in 2024 adopted a policy establishing REDD+ results-based payments as a permanent funding window within the Fund.

Comparisons of "effectiveness" across studies often differ because results are measured against counterfactual baselines (national FREL/FRL benchmarks or project-level baselines) and because methodological choices about reference periods, leakage, non-permanence risk management, and measurement uncertainty can materially change estimated or credited outcomes.

=== Evidence on measured impacts ===
Empirical evaluations of REDD+ and related forest-carbon initiatives report mixed and context-dependent results. A 2024 multi-country impact evaluation reported modest average forest outcomes and limited average welfare effects, with impacts not always sustained over time.

Evidence also varies across the project-based voluntary carbon market. A global quasi-experimental evaluation of 40 voluntary REDD+ projects certified under the Verified Carbon Standard across nine countries estimated lower rates of deforestation and degradation within project areas relative to matched counterfactual areas in the first five years of implementation, with larger effects in higher-deforestation settings and no strong evidence of substantial local leakage within 10 km of project boundaries. Other analyses have argued that credited outcomes can diverge from ex post estimates of additional forest protection where baseline assumptions are inflated; for example, an analysis of voluntary REDD+ projects in the Brazilian Amazon concluded that many project baselines implied higher deforestation than synthetic-control counterfactuals.

At the UNFCCC level, countries have begun reporting quantified REDD+ results through the Warsaw Framework processes. Brazil submitted the first technical annex to a biennial update report with quantified REDD+ results on 31 December 2014, covering the Amazon biome and undergoing technical analysis under ICA; the UNFCCC technical analysis found the information transparent and consistent, while highlighting areas for improvement (including expanding carbon pools, considering non-CO_{2} gases, improving forest degradation monitoring, and expanding monitoring to additional biomes).

In the voluntary carbon market, many forest-carbon projects described as "REDD+" quantify emissions reductions using independent crediting standards (commonly the Verified Carbon Standard (VCS)) and may seek certification for social and biodiversity co-benefits (for example, under the Climate, Community & Biodiversity Standards). Reviews comparing standards note that quantified outcomes and issued credits can be sensitive to baseline choices and to how additionality, leakage and non-permanence are addressed, contributing to ongoing debate about the climate benefits of some project-based credits.

=== Common limitations and uncertainties ===
Assessments of REDD+ commonly highlight several recurring methodological and implementation challenges:

- Baseline / reference level setting: because results are measured relative to a counterfactual benchmark (FREL/FRL or project baseline), choices about reference periods, data sources and adjustments can materially affect credited results.
- Additionality: demonstrating that observed reductions are caused by the intervention and would not have occurred otherwise can be difficult, especially where policies, markets, and enforcement change over time.
- Leakage (displacement): reduced deforestation or degradation in one area may be offset by increased forest loss elsewhere; the Cancun safeguards call for actions to reduce displacement of emissions, and many standards include leakage accounting approaches.
- Non-permanence (reversals): forest carbon gains may be reversed by fire, illegal logging or later land-use change; the Cancun safeguards call for actions to address reversal risk, and many standards use buffers and monitoring to manage reversals.
- Measurement uncertainty and capacity constraints: MRV remains challenging for forest degradation and for some carbon pools (for example, below-ground carbon), affecting comparability and confidence in results.

=== What counts as "success" ===
Under the UNFCCC, "success" is primarily defined in terms of measured and reported emissions reductions and/or enhanced removals against an assessed FREL/FRL, consistent MRV, and the implementation of safeguards, which together can underpin eligibility for results-based finance. In voluntary carbon markets, success is often judged by whether a project generates credits under an independent standard's rules (including provisions for additionality, leakage and permanence) and whether those credits are used by buyers for climate-related claims, which has contributed to ongoing debate over how to interpret and verify project-level outcomes and co-benefits.

== Criticisms and controversies ==
REDD+ has been the subject of debate about the effectiveness, governance and equity of forest-carbon programmes, and has been criticised by some researchers, Indigenous organisations and civil-society groups.

=== Land tenure, carbon rights and benefit distribution ===
Reviews in the REDD+ literature commonly highlight land tenure clarity and rights to carbon-related benefits as recurring implementation challenges. Where tenure is unclear or contested, analysts note that consent processes and benefit-sharing arrangements can be harder to implement and may be more vulnerable to disputes or elite capture, particularly in weak-governance contexts.

Indigenous organisations and NGOs working in forest regions have argued that communities can be sidelined in decision-making and may receive limited benefits where tenure is insecure and benefit-sharing rules are unclear.

Media investigations have also reported cases in which intermediaries sought long-term contractual control over carbon claims in Indigenous territories (sometimes described in coverage as "carbon cowboys"). Other reporting has warned that some offset schemes can be vulnerable to fraud or corruption where governance is weak.

UNFCCC guidance asks countries undertaking REDD+ to address land tenure and governance issues and to ensure full and effective participation of relevant stakeholders, alongside reporting on safeguards. Some researchers argue that community participation in monitoring and reporting can, under certain conditions, strengthen transparency and local engagement in REDD+ implementation.

=== Indigenous peoples, participation and safeguards ===
Indigenous organisations have criticised some REDD+ approaches on the grounds that forest-carbon initiatives could restrict customary land use or weaken control over lands and resources where implemented without secure tenure and meaningful consent. During the Bali climate negotiations in 2007, the International Indigenous Peoples Forum on Climate Change (IIPFCC) issued a statement opposing REDD/REDD+, stating that it "will not benefit Indigenous Peoples" and warning of "more violations of Indigenous Peoples' rights".

In response to concerns of this kind, the UNFCCC adopted the Cancun safeguards at COP 16, including calls for respect for the knowledge and rights of Indigenous peoples and for full and effective participation, and for actions to address risks of reversals and displacement of emissions. The UN-REDD Programme has also issued guidance on Free, prior and informed consent (FPIC).

Empirical studies and reviews nevertheless report that participation and FPIC practices have varied across initiatives, including cases where information-sharing was limited or consent processes were contested. Human Rights Watch has reported alleged rights violations linked to specific forest-carbon projects, including claims relating to land and resource access and consultation processes.

=== Offsets and carbon markets ===
In early debates on REDD+ finance, Parties and observers discussed market-based approaches (including the use of credits as offsets) as well as fund-based approaches. Critics of offset-based designs argued that large volumes of forest credits could depress carbon prices and undermine incentives for forest protection or for domestic emissions reductions. Some developing countries maintained that developed countries should prioritise domestic emissions reductions rather than relying on offset mechanisms.

Since COP 17, UNFCCC decisions have treated REDD+ as potentially financed by a variety of sources, including market and non-market approaches. The Green Climate Fund has supported readiness and implementation activities and has also made results-based payments for REDD+ through a pilot programme (2017-2022) and subsequent policy adopted in 2024 establishing REDD+ results-based payments as a standing funding window within the Fund.

In the voluntary carbon market, crediting standards for REDD+ projects have developed detailed requirements intended to address issues such as baseline setting, additionality, leakage and non-permanence, although reviews continue to debate the strengths and limits of different approaches. Some policy frameworks that accept offsets apply additional eligibility rules and authorization restrictions intended to address double-claiming concerns.

=== Governance and institutional design ===
While UNFCCC decisions emphasise national ownership and stakeholder participation, research on REDD+ governance describes challenges in coordinating policies across levels of government and in addressing underlying political and economic drivers of deforestation. Case studies and comparative analyses highlight that outcomes can depend on domestic political economy, forest tenure arrangements and administrative capacity.

Civil-society organisations and social movements have criticised aspects of REDD+ and related carbon-fund initiatives on climate-justice and rights grounds, including concerns about consultation processes and safeguards in early programmes. At the same time, comparative work describes a range of REDD+ initiatives and notes that REDD+ has influenced policy debates in some contexts, including debates on forest rights and safeguards in national policy discourse and pilot projects.

An Indigenous Environmental Network paper criticised the role of the International Tropical Timber Organization (ITTO) in forest-carbon debates, arguing that framing logging under "sustainable management" could enable business-as-usual forest extraction while benefiting from carbon finance.

=== Natural forests vs. high-density plantations ===
Critics note that definitions of "forest" used in international reporting and national policy can be broad and may include plantations or tree crops. Some NGOs argue that treating plantations as forests can obscure differences between natural forests and plantations and may create perverse incentives if carbon finance rewards tree cover regardless of biodiversity and social impacts.

The UNFCCC Cancun safeguards include a call for REDD+ to be consistent with the conservation of natural forests and biodiversity and not to be used for the conversion of natural forests, alongside requirements to address risks such as reversals and displacement of emissions; countries report on how safeguards are addressed and respected through safeguard information systems and related summaries of information.

== See also ==
- Deforestation and climate change
- Land use, land-use change and forestry
- Ecosystem service
- Carbon offsets and credits
- Clean Development Mechanism
