= Forest reference emission level =

Benchmark for assessing national REDD+ forest-sector emissions and removals

Forest reference emission levels (FRELs) and related forest reference levels (FRLs) are benchmarks used under the United Nations Framework Convention on Climate Change (UNFCCC) for assessing performance in REDD+ implementation. They are expressed as tonnes of carbon dioxide equivalent (CO2e) per year for a reference period and compared with emissions and removals reported for a results period.

Developing country Parties implementing REDD+ may submit proposed national FRELs and/or FRLs on a voluntary basis and when deemed appropriate. For results-based payments, each submission is subject to a technical assessment coordinated by the UNFCCC secretariat under decision 13/CP.19, part of the Warsaw Framework for REDD-plus. Parties may update reference levels over time using a stepwise approach that incorporates improved data and methodologies, while maintaining consistency with national greenhouse gas inventories.

== Background ==
Within the UNFCCC framework for REDD+, developing country Parties aiming to undertake REDD+ activities are requested to develop several elements, including a national strategy or action plan, a national forest reference emission level and/or forest reference level, a national forest monitoring system, and a system for providing information on how safeguards are addressed and respected (see Cancún safeguards). The Cancun Agreements describe REDD+ implementation as a phased approach that begins with strategy development and capacity-building and evolves into results-based actions that should be fully measured, reported and verified; reference levels provide the benchmark against which reported results are assessed under UNFCCC decisions.

== Definition and terminology ==
UNFCCC decisions and technical documents commonly refer to a "forest reference emission level and/or forest reference level" as the benchmark against which REDD+ results are assessed. At an expert meeting convened under the Subsidiary Body for Scientific and Technological Advice (SBSTA) in 2011, participants noted that the concepts required clarification and described differing interpretations of the distinction between FRELs and FRLs. One view treated the two terms as a single net number, using "forest reference emission level" when net emissions are estimated and "forest reference level" when net removals are estimated; another view associated "forest reference emission level" with emissions from deforestation and forest degradation and "forest reference level" with the "plus" activities (conservation, forest management and enhancement of forest carbon stocks). In practice, UNFCCC materials and UN-REDD technical syntheses often use the paired term "FREL/FRL" to describe the reference level communicated by a Party for technical assessment.

Because reported REDD+ results are assessed relative to the submitted benchmark, choices about the reference period, data sources, scope (activities and carbon pools), and any adjustments can affect the quantity of results calculated against a reference level, which has made transparency and documentation central themes in UNFCCC technical discussions.

Reference levels are typically presented as a yearly total (tonnes of carbon dioxide equivalent per year) for a chosen reference period and used as the benchmark for comparing emissions and removals reported for a results period when assessing performance in implementing REDD+ activities. UNFCCC decisions also call for reference levels to be consistent with a country's greenhouse gas inventory estimates and allow Parties to update them over time as data and methods improve.

== Construction ==
Decision 12/CP.17 calls for forest reference emission levels and/or forest reference levels to be constructed and presented in a transparent manner and states that submissions should follow the most recent Intergovernmental Panel on Climate Change (IPCC) guidance and guidelines, as adopted or encouraged by the Conference of the Parties.

In broad terms, reference levels draw on historical information, combining data on changes in forest area with estimates of emissions and removals. Approaches can also use averages or trends where transparently justified; country submissions have varied in scope and methods, and stepwise improvement has been used to incorporate better data and methods over time.

UNFCCC decisions call for submissions to summarise the key information used to construct the reference level. This includes the historical information relied on, the datasets and methods used (including key assumptions), the REDD+ activities and carbon pools covered (and reasons for omitting any), and the forest definition applied. The technical assessment considers, among other issues, whether the reference level is consistent with forest-related greenhouse gas emissions and removals in the national greenhouse gas inventory and whether the information is transparent and complete.

Decision 12/CP.17 agreed that a stepwise approach to developing national reference levels may be useful, enabling Parties to improve reference levels by incorporating better data, improved methodologies and, where appropriate, additional pools; it also invited developing country Parties to update reference levels periodically as appropriate, taking into account new knowledge, new trends and any modification of scope and methodologies. SBSTA discussions linked this approach to the idea that Parties may start with simpler estimates where data are limited and improve them over time as better information becomes available.

Decision 12/CP.17 also acknowledged that subnational forest reference emission levels and/or forest reference levels may be elaborated as an interim measure while transitioning to a national forest reference emission level and/or forest reference level, and that interim reference levels may cover less than a Party's entire national territory of forest area.

== UNFCCC submission and technical assessment ==
Developing country Parties implementing REDD+ may submit proposed FRELs and/or FRLs on a voluntary basis and when deemed appropriate. The UNFCCC secretariat coordinates the technical assessment process, which is conducted once per year as a centralised activity. Decision 13/CP.19 provides for a facilitative, non-intrusive technical exchange of information during assessment, and includes steps such as sharing a draft report with the submitting Party and considering clarifications provided during the process.

Technical assessment reports illustrate how submissions can differ by scope and scale. For example, the report for Guyana assessed a national FREL that covered reducing emissions from deforestation and forest degradation. The report for Colombia assessed an interim FREL for the Amazonia biome focused on deforestation, with forest degradation discussed as a candidate for future inclusion as methods and data improve and as Colombia transitions toward a national reference level. The report for Malaysia assessed a national FRL for sustainable management of forests in production forests within the permanent reserve forest, based on historical averages of net CO2 removals from forest growth and emissions from timber harvesting.

== Relationship to results-based payments ==
Under UNFCCC decisions on results-based payments for REDD+, developing country Parties seeking to obtain and receive payments are expected to have key elements in place. These include an assessed forest reference emission level and/or forest reference level, alongside a national strategy or action plan, a national forest monitoring system and a system for providing information on how safeguards are addressed and respected; results-based actions are to be fully measured, reported and verified.

== Challenges and critique ==
Several challenges have been identified in developing and updating reference levels. These include limits in historical data and monitoring capacity (which can increase uncertainty), difficulties in measuring forest degradation compared with more visible forest loss, and differences in the way "forest" is defined across national reporting systems (which can affect forest-area and deforestation estimates). UNFCCC decisions therefore require Parties to explain key choices used in constructing a reference level, including the forest definition applied and explanations where definitions differ from those used in national greenhouse gas inventories or other international reporting, and these issues may be considered during technical assessment.

Some analyses of reference emission level approaches have argued that the choice of reference period and baseline method can influence incentives. For example, a study comparing alternative approaches for setting reference emission levels argued that if reference levels are constructed by simple extrapolation of historical forest-area change, countries could behave strategically during the reference period to improve their starting position, creating perverse incentives (for example, higher deforestation rates during the reference period could make it easier to generate credits later). A policy-oriented report on reference levels cautioned that upward adjustments to historical baselines based on planned national policies can be overestimated, and argued that allowing such adjustments without empirical justification could undermine environmental integrity and the credibility of a REDD+ mechanism.

Related technical literature discusses nesting - approaches for relating project-scale REDD+ activities and baselines to larger jurisdictional programmes and their reference levels, including accounting arrangements intended to avoid double counting of emissions reductions across scales.
