= National forest monitoring system =

National system for monitoring forests and supporting reporting

A national forest monitoring system (NFMS) is a country's institutional and technical arrangement for monitoring forests and producing information for decision-making and reporting, as described by the Food and Agriculture Organization of the United Nations (FAO).

In the context of REDD+, Decision 11/CP.19 under the United Nations Framework Convention on Climate Change (UNFCCC), adopted as part of the Warsaw Framework for REDD+, encourages developing countries undertaking REDD+ activities to establish NFMSs that are transparent and consistent and that draw on both remote sensing and ground-based forest inventory approaches, as appropriate to national circumstances. The Global Forest Observations Initiative (GFOI) sets out methods for integrating satellite and ground-based observations for estimating emissions and removals from forests in this reporting context.

A NFMS brings together institutional arrangements (such as roles, coordination, and data stewardship) with technical methods for data collection, management, quality assurance, and dissemination of results, as set out in FAO publications and by the UN-REDD Programme. NFMSs can produce outputs such as time series of forest area and change, maps, and estimates of biomass or carbon stocks, with accompanying documentation and uncertainty information. These outputs can support land-use greenhouse-gas inventories prepared using methods from the Intergovernmental Panel on Climate Change (IPCC) and can contribute to periodic forest assessments such as FAO's Global Forest Resources Assessment (FRA).

== Background ==
NFMSs were developed to support national and international reporting on forest area and change, including reporting under REDD+ and broader forest-related climate reporting where countries provide information on forests and, where relevant, estimates of greenhouse-gas emissions and removals associated with forests and land-use change (see also Deforestation and climate change).

Studies using FAO's Global Forest Resources Assessment (FRA) reporting have examined changes in national forest monitoring capacities over time. An assessment of 99 tropical countries using FRA data for 2005, 2010, and 2015 reported increases in the area covered by “good to very good” remote-sensing-based forest-area-change monitoring and in forest-inventory capacities, while carbon-pool reporting capacities improved less, and it highlighted continued capacity-development needs. A later global assessment covering 236 countries and territories reported increases between FRA 2005 and FRA 2020 in the number of countries with “good to very good” capacities for monitoring forest area using remote sensing (from 55 to 99) and using national forest inventories (from 48 to 102).

== Design and outputs ==
FAO's voluntary guidelines and UN-REDD materials treat a NFMS as both an organisational setup and a technical workflow. On the organisational side, a NFMS typically assigns responsibilities across one or more national institutions for tasks such as remote-sensing analysis, field inventories, data custody, and quality assurance, supported by coordination and data-sharing arrangements that allow results to be reproduced and reviewed over time.

On the technical side, these sources link NFMS design to the use of national forest definitions and classification systems for monitoring and reporting, and to the combination of satellite-based mapping of forest area and change with ground-based measurements (such as national forest inventories) used to estimate forest attributes, including biomass and carbon stocks. They also emphasise data management and archiving (including metadata), documented quality assurance and quality control procedures, and reporting workflows that produce maps, summary statistics, and supporting documentation suitable for national use and international reporting.

== Reporting and uses ==
Decision 11/CP.19 under the UNFCCC encourages countries undertaking REDD+ activities to use NFMSs to support transparent and consistent monitoring and reporting, drawing on both remote sensing and ground-based forest inventory approaches as appropriate to national circumstances. In REDD+ results-based reporting, UNFCCC documentation treats having a national forest monitoring system and an assessed forest reference emission level and/or forest reference level as elements associated with eligibility for results-based payments.

The GFOI describes how NFMS outputs can be used as inputs to greenhouse-gas reporting for the land-use sector, including the development of area-change data (often referred to as activity data) and estimates of emissions and removals aligned with IPCC inventory methods. FAO publications also present NFMS outputs as inputs to national decision-making and to broader forest assessments and reporting products, including the Global Forest Resources Assessment.

Several international initiatives associated with REDD+ have also published technical documents intended to support NFMS design and implementation, including UN-REDD material on monitoring, measurement, reporting, and verification in the REDD+ context. The Global Observations of Forest Cover and Land-use Dynamics (GOFC-GOLD) sourcebook is a technical manual that compiles methods and procedures for monitoring and reporting anthropogenic greenhouse-gas emissions and removals associated with deforestation and changes in forest carbon stocks, incorporating NFMSs.

== Challenges and limitations ==
Academic literature on REDD+ monitoring and measurement, reporting, and verification discusses constraints related to institutional capacity and sustained resourcing, including the need for coordination across agencies responsible for remote sensing, field inventories, and greenhouse-gas reporting. Maintaining consistent methods and organisational arrangements over time while improving data and methods can affect the comparability of time series and the interpretation of reported results.

Comparative assessments based on FAO FRA reporting have also pointed to uneven capacity across NFMS components over time, and to the need for continued capacity development and regular updates to maintain systems. Methodological documents emphasise uncertainties in estimates derived from both remote sensing and field measurements, and the need for documented quality assurance and quality control and accuracy assessment when integrating datasets and producing estimates for reporting.
