= Taskforce on Scaling Voluntary Carbon Markets =

Private-sector initiative to scale the voluntary carbon market

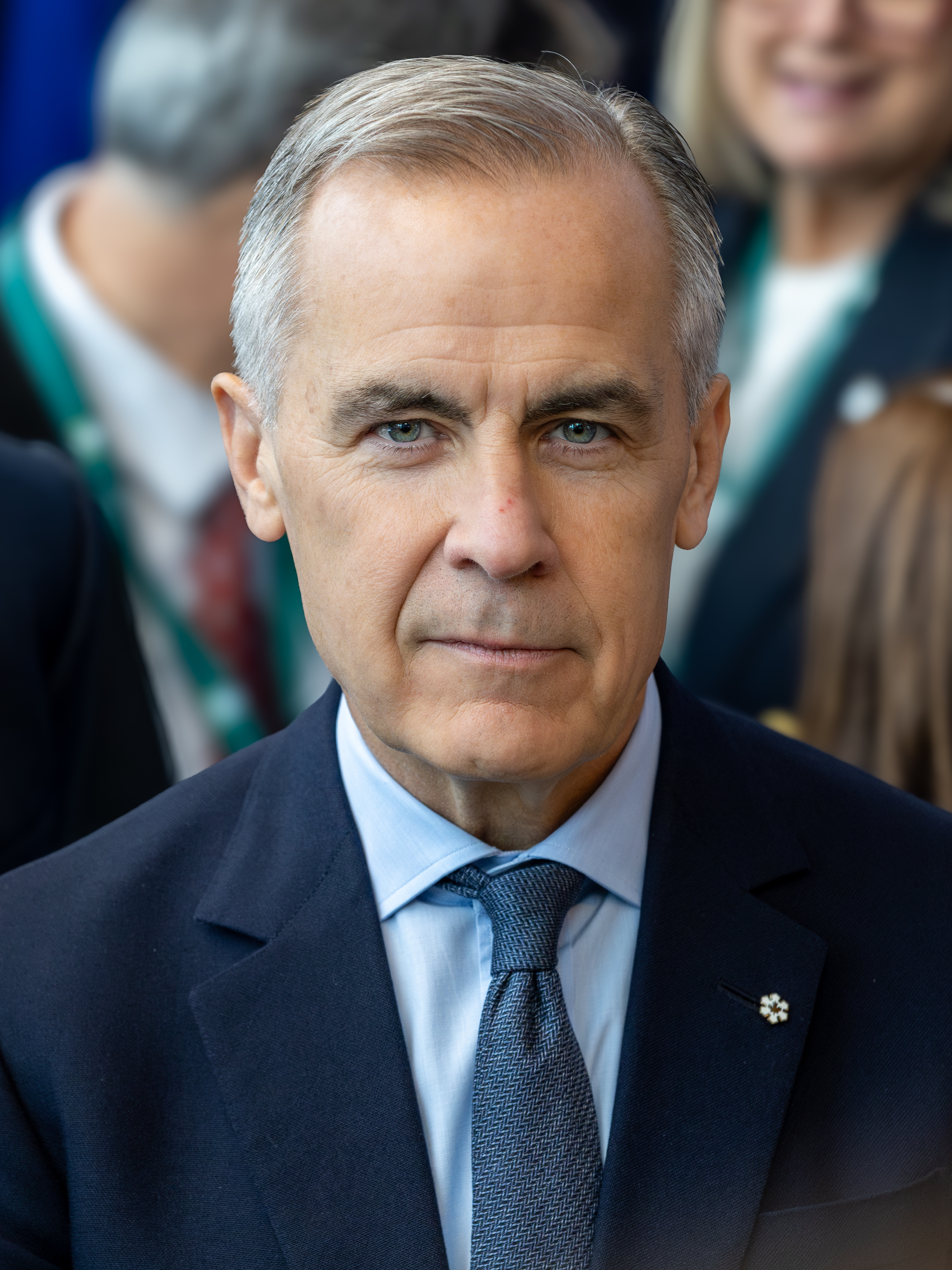
- Mark Carney, who initiated TSVCM
- Abbreviation: TSVCM
- Founded: September 2020
- Founder: Mark Carney
- Type: Private sector-led market integrity initiative for the Voluntary carbon market
- Purpose: Developed recommendations for scaling voluntary carbon markets and improving confidence in carbon-credit integrity, including proposed Core Carbon Principles and plans for an independent governance body.
- Region served: Global
- Members: Over 250 member institutions
- Key people: Bill Winters (chair); Annette Nazareth (operating lead)
- Parent organization: Institute of International Finance (IIF)
- Website: www.iif.com/tsvcm

The Taskforce on Scaling Voluntary Carbon Markets (TSVCM) was a private sector-led initiative sponsored by the Institute of International Finance (IIF) that produced recommendations intended to scale the voluntary carbon market and increase confidence in the integrity of carbon credits used for voluntary climate-change mitigation claims.

The initiative was initiated by Mark Carney and chaired by Bill Winters. Between 2020 and 2021 it published consultation materials and reports proposing baseline integrity criteria (the Core Carbon Principles) and associated governance and market-infrastructure arrangements intended to support a larger, more standardised market.

In 2021 the initiative announced a new governance body to take forward its integrity-benchmark work; that body later adopted the name Integrity Council for the Voluntary Carbon Market (ICVCM). The taskforce's proposals received public attention and prompted debate about market governance, including concerns about independence and representation of Indigenous peoples and local communities in oversight.

== Background ==
Voluntary carbon markets involve carbon credits issued and traded outside mandatory (compliance) emissions-trading systems; credits are widely used in corporate and organisational climate strategies, including to support claims about compensating or neutralising emissions.

Academic and policy analysis has repeatedly highlighted integrity and transparency risks in these markets, including uncertainty about whether credited outcomes are additional, how baselines are set, and whether risks such as leakage, non-permanence and double counting are managed consistently across different credit types and jurisdictions.

=== Terminology ===
In the voluntary carbon market, a carbon credit is commonly treated as a unit representing one tonne of CO2-equivalent reduced or removed, and an offset is the use of credits to compensate for emissions elsewhere in an organisation's footprint. Integrity concepts discussed in this context include additionality and controls to reduce double counting.

TSVCM's documentation used these integrity concepts in proposing market-wide benchmarks meant to apply across different standards and project types rather than creating a single new crediting programme.

== Academic and policy analysis ==
Academic and policy literature has discussed a tension between scaling voluntary carbon markets and maintaining credibility, emphasising how heterogeneous project types, fragmented governance and information asymmetries can make credit quality difficult to assess and can create incentives for low-integrity supply and weak disclosure.

Work focused on disclosure has argued that stronger transparency, supported by standardised and accessible project and credit data, can improve scrutiny and accountability for carbon credit mechanisms and associated claims.

Legal and policy analysis of corporate offsetting has debated how credits should be used in net-zero strategies, including concerns that weak governance and disclosure can enable misleading claims or reduce pressure for direct emissions reductions.

In this context, TSVCM presented its reports as a reform approach focused on common integrity principles and governance arrangements intended to enable market growth while addressing quality and confidence concerns.

== Establishment ==
TSVCM was convened in September 2020 and released initial recommendations in November 2020 as part of its stated aim to support the development of a larger voluntary carbon market with improved integrity and transparency.

Contemporaneous reporting described the initiative as an effort to develop market-wide rules and infrastructure for voluntary carbon credits, including integrity criteria intended to raise confidence in voluntary offsetting and related claims.

== Leadership and participation ==
TSVCM described itself as initiated by Mark Carney and chaired by Bill Winters, with an operating lead and supporting structures for its work programme.

Its initial materials described a taskforce drawing participants from multiple sectors, together with a broader consultation group that included financial institutions, market infrastructure providers and buyers and suppliers of carbon credits.

In March 2021 the initiative announced an advisory board and working groups for its development and implementation phase, describing these as intended to incorporate technical and market input across the voluntary carbon market value chain, including engagement with civil society and academia.

Media reporting described participation by major financial institutions and other market actors, alongside criticism from some civil-society organisations focused on governance design and potential conflicts of interest in proposed oversight arrangements.

As part of its governance proposals, the initiative sought candidates for a new governance body intended to provide independent oversight and integrity benchmark-setting for the voluntary carbon market.

== Workstreams and process ==
TSVCM described its work as moving from a design phase to a development and implementation phase supported by an advisory board and working groups, with draft proposals released for public consultation and feedback summarised in a consultation report.

It established three working groups with remits covering governance, legal principles and contracts, and credit-level integrity, including work on proposed Core Carbon Principles and market infrastructure recommendations.

- Governance: identification of governance gaps and options for addressing them, including approaches for establishing (or using existing) governance bodies.
- Legal principles and contracts: development of standard contract mechanics and templates intended to support trading of carbon credits.
- Credit-level integrity: development of threshold standards intended to raise credit quality, including through the proposed Core Carbon Principles.

== Work and outputs ==
In January 2021 TSVCM published a final report setting out proposals for scaling voluntary carbon markets, including integrity concepts associated with the proposed Core Carbon Principles and recommendations on market governance and infrastructure.

It also released consultation materials and governance documents outlining proposed roles and processes for a new governance body, including how eligibility guidance and assessment processes could be organised and maintained over time.

In July 2021 TSVCM published a roadmap describing further steps for market development and integrity, including proposals related to governance and market infrastructure.

== Recommendations ==
TSVCM's final report presented recommendations on credit-quality criteria, governance arrangements, and market infrastructure, alongside proposals for shared data and transparency practices intended to support voluntary carbon market growth.

=== Integrity and quality criteria ===
TSVCM proposed the Core Carbon Principles (CCPs) as baseline integrity criteria for credits, alongside a taxonomy of additional attributes intended to describe characteristics beyond the baseline for different buyer preferences and use cases.

It proposed assessing existing standards and underlying methodologies for alignment with the CCPs, with the aim of distinguishing credits meeting the baseline criteria within a fragmented market of programmes and credit types.

Governance design documents envisaged that CCP eligibility guidance and assessment processes would be maintained and updated by a governance body, rather than treated as a fixed, self-executing rulebook.

=== Governance body ===
TSVCM proposed establishing a new governance body to set and maintain integrity benchmarks across voluntary carbon markets and to coordinate how standards and market participants are evaluated against agreed criteria.

The terms of reference described functions including hosting eligibility guidelines and an assessment framework for the Core Carbon Principles, developing or maintaining eligibility principles for some market participants, and coordinating interlinkages between relevant market bodies as part of a strategic roadmap for market growth.

Reporting on the proposed governance arrangements described plans for a board supported by expert input to set integrity criteria and related market rules.

=== Market infrastructure and standardisation ===
TSVCM's final report proposed standardised "core carbon" reference contracts and exchange-traded products, including spot and futures structures, as mechanisms to improve comparability, liquidity and price discovery while still allowing bespoke transactions. In practical terms, the report treated standardised products and contracts as tools to make credits easier to compare and trade across different market venues and counterparties.

The report also discussed standardised approaches for over-the-counter transactions, including using reference-contract pricing as a benchmark for more customised bilateral trades.

=== Data, registry and market transparency proposals ===
TSVCM proposed a "meta-registry" concept and other post-trade infrastructure intended to align key data across registries and improve the tracking of credits through transactions, including to reduce integrity risks such as double counting. It described this as a shared data layer linking registry identifiers and transaction status so credits could be traced consistently as they move between accounts and intermediaries.

The report also proposed shared data fields and protocols intended to be broadly accessible, framing common data infrastructure as a way to increase transparency and oversight as trading volumes grew.

=== Market integrity assurance ===
The report discussed market-wide integrity controls and described proposals including accelerated verification and market-wide guidance on Anti-money laundering and Know your customer practices in voluntary carbon market activity.

It also identified legal, accounting and reporting frameworks as areas that could shape documentation practices and disclosure expectations for the use of credits in climate-related claims.

== Relationship to carbon-crediting programmes and standards ==
Voluntary carbon credits are typically issued and tracked through crediting programmes and registries that set methodologies and verification requirements for different project types.

TSVCM framed its proposals as market-wide benchmarks intended to operate across (rather than replace) existing programmes, with the governance model envisaged as an overlay that would assess standards and practices against common criteria such as the Core Carbon Principles.

In an interview, the chief executive of Verra described voluntary offsetting as relying on certification programmes and said the organisation supported most of TSVCM's recommendations as part of broader integrity work in voluntary markets.

Market-data and tracking providers also expanded transparency and analysis linked to the scaling agenda discussed in TSVCM's work; Ecosystem Marketplace announced it would integrate data from major voluntary carbon registries into its market database and tracking products in response to calls for improved information and monitoring.

== Transition and successor initiatives ==
In September 2021 TSVCM announced a new governance body to take forward integrity-benchmark work for voluntary carbon markets; the body later adopted the name Integrity Council for the Voluntary Carbon Market (ICVCM).

Separate initiatives focused on the integrity of corporate claims associated with voluntary carbon credit use include the Voluntary Carbon Markets Integrity Initiative (VCMI).

== Reception ==
Media coverage described TSVCM as part of wider efforts to standardise a fragmented voluntary carbon market, and reporting highlighted disagreements among stakeholders over governance design and trading and eligibility rules.

In the same period, some market participants publicly supported the initiative's general direction; for example, Verra's chief executive said the organisation supported most of TSVCM's recommendations as part of broader voluntary-market integrity work.

Civil-society feedback on TSVCM's consultation materials argued that elements of the proposals raised concerns about governance independence and about how offsets should be used in corporate climate strategies and claims.

== Legacy and later debate ==
Later analyses continued to identify concerns about credit quality and information asymmetries in voluntary markets, even as reform efforts proceeded and new governance initiatives were launched to address integrity questions.

Following TSVCM's transition, ICVCM continued work on integrity benchmarks linked to the Core Carbon Principles, including approving and assessing particular crediting approaches against its criteria as part of a broader effort to distinguish higher-integrity credits within the market.

== Criticism and limitations ==
Criticism of TSVCM's approach took place against a broader debate about whether voluntary carbon markets can be expanded while reliably addressing persistent integrity and verification challenges across diverse credit types and project settings.

=== Offsets as a substitute for emissions cuts ===
A recurrent critique of scaling voluntary offset markets is that easy access to credits may enable some organisations to rely on offsets rather than prioritising direct emissions reductions, potentially delaying real-world decarbonisation while allowing continued emissions to be framed as compensated.

=== Conflict-of-interest concerns ===
Criticism of TSVCM's proposed governance arrangements included concerns that oversight could be insufficiently independent from commercial interests in carbon-credit markets, particularly where active market participants could influence decisions about eligibility rules and integrity benchmarks.

=== Indigenous rights and safeguards ===
Debate about scaling forest-related offsets and voluntary carbon markets has included concerns that Indigenous peoples and local communities may be inadequately represented in rule-setting and investment decisions, with calls for safeguards and effective participation where forest-carbon finance is linked to voluntary climate claims.

In announcing the governance body intended to take forward TSVCM's integrity work, the initiative said participation from Indigenous peoples and local communities should be ensured as integrity principles and market rules were developed.

=== Skepticism about credit integrity and verification limits ===
A further strand of criticism questions whether recurring integrity challenges in voluntary carbon markets, such as additionality, baseline-setting, and limits of verification, can be addressed reliably enough to justify large-scale expansion without perpetuating disputed or low-integrity credits.

== See also ==
- REDD+
