= Annette Nazareth =

American lawyer

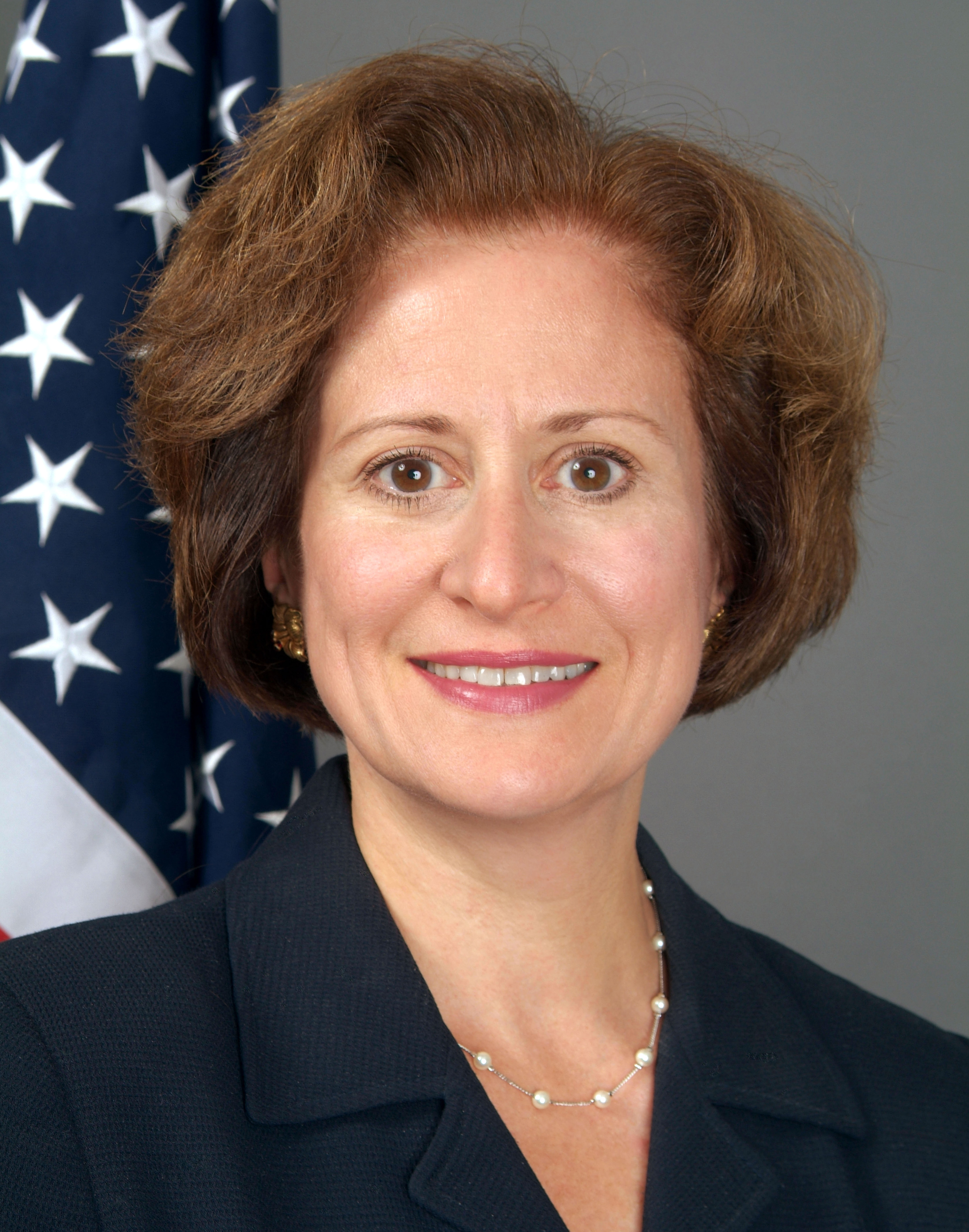

Personal details
- Born: January 27, 1956 (age 70) Providence, Rhode Island, U.S.
- Party: Democratic
- Spouse: Roger W. Ferguson Jr.
- Education: Brown University (BA); Columbia University (JD)

Annette LaPorte Nazareth (born January 27, 1956) is an American attorney who served as a Commissioner of the U.S. Securities and Exchange Commission from August 4, 2005 to January 31, 2008. She is currently a partner at Davis Polk & Wardwell, where she works on regulatory matters and transactions in the firm's Washington, D.C. office. In 2021, she was appointed as Co-Chair of the Integrity Council for the Voluntary Carbon Market and in 2024 as a Freeman of London.

== Early life and education ==
Naraeth was born on January 27, 1956, in Providence, Rhode Island and was raised near Providence. In 1978, she graduated from Brown University with an A.B., magna cum laude and Phi Beta Kappa. Nazareth went on to receive a Juris Doctor from Columbia Law School, where she was a Harlan Fiske Stone Scholar.

== Career ==
Following law school, Nazareth was an associate with the law firm of Davis Polk & Wardwell in 1981. From 1986 to 1994, she served as managing director and general counsel of Mabon Securities Corp. and its predecessor business, Mabon, Nugent & Co. From 1994 to 1997, Nazareth was a senior vice president and senior counsel of the fixed income division of Lehman Brothers. From 1997 to 1998, she was a managing director of Citigroup's Salomon Smith Barney unit as deputy head of the capital markets legal group.

== Securities and Exchange Commission ==
In 1998, Nazareth joined the Securities and Exchange Commission as senior counsel to former SEC chairman Arthur Levitt and served briefly as the interim director of the Division of Investment Management. She then served as SEC director of the Division of Market Regulation from March 1999 to August 2005. As director, she had primary responsibility for the supervision and regulation of the U.S. securities markets.

=== SEC Commissioner ===
Nazareth, a Democrat, was a political appointee as an SEC commissioner on August 4, 2005, by Republican President George W. Bush. (By statute, no more than three SEC commissioners may belong to the same political party.) As a commissioner, she worked on numerous initiatives, including execution quality disclosure rules, implementation of equities decimal pricing, short sale reforms, implementation of a voluntary regime for consolidated supervision of broker-dealer holding companies and modernization of the national market system rules. Nazareth also served as the commission's representative on the Financial Stability Forum from 1999 to 2008.

=== Consolidated Supervised Entity ===
According to the SEC, "Ms. Nazareth also championed the introduction of prudential regulatory principles to the Commission's work under the Consolidated Supervised Entity program, a voluntary supervisory regime for the nation's largest investment bank holding companies."

Following the collapse of Lehman Brothers, the sale of Bear Stearns and Merrill Lynch to bank holding companies, and the conversion of Morgan Stanley and Goldman Sachs into bank holding companies, the CSE program was left without participating investment bank holding companies. As a result, SEC Chairman Christopher Cox in September 2008 announced a decision by the Commission to end the CSE program. The Commission's official press release stated:

"The last six months have made it abundantly clear that voluntary regulation does not work. When Congress passed the Gramm-Leach-Bliley Act, it created a significant regulatory gap by failing to give to the SEC or any agency the authority to regulate large investment bank holding companies, like Goldman Sachs, Morgan Stanley, Merrill Lynch, Lehman Brothers, and Bear Stearns."

Cox took care not to attribute the demise of Bear Stearns to the CSE program, however. In a March 20, 2008, letter to the Chairman of the Basel Committee on Banking Supervision, Cox stated, "As you will see, the conclusion to which these data point is that the fate of Bear Stearns was the result of a lack of confidence, not a lack of capital. When the tumult began last week, and at all times until its agreement to be acquired by JP Morgan Chase during the weekend, the firm had a capital cushion well above what is required to meet supervisory standards calculated using the Basel II standard."

== Integrity Council for the Voluntary Carbon Market ==
In 2020 Mark Carney established a Taskforce on Scaling Voluntary Carbon Markets, chaired by Bill Winters with Nazareth as the operations lead. After a public consultation process, the group released its first report at Davos 2021 that recommended the establishment of an umbrella governance body to improve the robustness of carbon offsets. Nazareth chairs the resulting new integrity council and leads the development of its "core carbon principles" that lay out more robust standards for carbon offsetting.
