= Dolores Hansen =

Canadian judge

Judge of the Federal Court
- In office July 2, 2003 – May 31, 2016

Personal details
- Born: October 16, 1946 (age 79) Edmonton, Alberta

Dolores Hansen (born October 16, 1946) was a judge at the Administrative Tribunal of the International Labour Organization and a former judge of the Federal Court of Canada.
