= John Parsons (Inspector General) =

John Parsons was the Inspector General for the Global Fund to Fight AIDS, Tuberculosis and Malaria ("The Global Fund") from 2008 to November 2012. Under his leadership, the Office of the Inspector General (OIG) revealed that up to two-thirds of certain Global Fund grants may have been lost to corruption through forged documents, improper bookkeeping, the diversion of donated prescription drugs to the black market, and other irregularities. Two OIG reports (one covering grants to a sub-recipient in Bangladesh and another to a principal recipient in Djibouti) identified losses of $10M, which was more than 50 percent of the total funds disbursed to the recipient governments and non-governmental organisations.

In a controversial decision, the Global Fund's Board terminated Parsons in November 2012. A news release issued by the Global Fund on the removal of Parsons as Inspector General stated that the Board "made its decision based on factors including: a performance review; an independent external peer review of the audit function; and a report to the Board by its Audit and Ethics Committee." However, the Board has not substantiated the performance allegations or released Parsons' performance reviews. The Aids Healthcare Foundation (AHF) called Parsons' dismissal a "hatchet job."

== Biography ==
Parsons, a British citizen, worked for the United Kingdom National Audit Office from 1973 to 1996, and was appointed Director there in 1989. From 1989 to 1990, he was seconded to the US Government Accountability Office, where he conducted performance audits in the education and defence sectors. Parsons was the director of UNICEF's Office of Internal Audit in New York from 1996 to 2000 and director of the United Nations Educational, Scientific and Cultural Organization's (UNESCO) Internal Oversight Service immediately prior to joining the Global Fund. He has also served on the Global Advisory Group to the World Health Organization.

== Work at the Global Fund ==
Parsons began working at the Global Fund in 2008 and worked as its second inspector general. In this position, he led the OIG, which provides the Global Fund "with independent and objective assurance over the design and effectiveness of controls in place to manage the key risks impacting the Global Fund's programs and operations." The OIG's mandate covers audits and investigations of fraud allegations, including those from whistleblowers. Under Parsons, from 2008 to 2009 the number of investigations from whistleblower complaints tripled (to 66 investigations). A report by a leader in the ethics field praised Parsons and his staff as "gracious and patient" and stated that "his leadership vision and commitment to ethical conduct is tangible in all that he does."

Parsons recruited Robert Appleton, a former US federal prosecutor and chairman of the United Nations Procurement Task Force, to assist him at the Global Fund. Investigations that Appleton led found that up to two-thirds of certain Global Fund grants were lost to graft. According to an Associated Press story, the OIG identified more than $34 million in losses in Global Fund grants in various countries in Africa. The OIG could not provide an overall accounting of how much was lost at the Global Fund because it "examined only a tiny fraction of the $10 billion that the fund has spent since its creation in 2002."

Parsons praised the OIG findings as evidence of the Global Fund's dedication to uncovering corruption and said that the organisation's commitment to investigating wrongdoing "should be viewed as a comparative advantage to anyone who's thinking about putting funds in here." He said that at the Fund, "if there is any question of misappropriation, action is taken, things happen, people are asked to repay the money, people get taken through the courts and end up in prison if they misappropriated our funds."

Former George W. Bush speech writer Michael Gerson weighed in on the Associated Press story saying that: “This particular narrative – the story of useless, wasted aid – is durable. It is also misleading and might be deadly. The Global Fund controversy illustrates the point. The two-thirds figure applies to one element of one country's grant – the single most extreme example in the world. Investigations are ongoing, but the $34 million in fraud that has been exposed represents about three-tenths of 1 percent of the money the fund has distributed. The targeting of these particular cases was not random; they were the most obviously problematic, not the most typical....These cases of corruption were not exposed by an enterprising journalist. They were revealed by the fund itself. The inspector general's office reviewed 59,000 documents in the case of Mali alone, then provided the findings to prosecutors in that country. Fifteen officials in Mali have been arrested and imprisoned. The outrage at corruption in foreign aid is justified. But this is what accountability and transparency in foreign aid look like. The true scandal is decades of assistance in which such corruption was assumed instead of investigated and exposed... It was the United States – the fund's largest supporter – that pushed in 2005 for the appointment of a strong inspector general to fight fraud. He is now doing his job.”

In response to the OIG's findings, the Global Fund took several corrective actions, including establishing a High-Level Panel to investigate the Fund's ability to prevent and detect fraud. The panel's report found the OIG to be "the only risk mitigation strategy within the Global Fund that has worked as designed." In addition, the Panel strongly recommended that approximately $34 million in lost grant money be returned and millions were indeed recovered.

== Controversial Termination ==
Initially, the Global Fund announced that it would increase resources for the OIG in the wake of these findings, but its Board subsequently considered scaling back investigations and releasing less information about them publicly and to donors. Parsons publicly opposed these latter changes: he believed that this “could be interpreted negatively and as a purposeful effort to suppress material information.”

On 15 November 2012 the Global Fund's Board – which includes members representing countries that receive grants from the Fund – announced it had hired a new executive director and fired Parsons. Prior to Parsons' termination, the OIG had a caseload of 142 active investigations, an increase of 70 percent from two years prior. The Board said it made its decision based on factors including: a performance review; an independent external peer review of the audit function; and a report to the Board by its Audit and Ethics Committee.

The Fund announced that it would appoint an interim inspector general for six months, while it looked for a permanent replacement. The Board's statement also mentioned the Global Fund's support for an independent and strong Office of the Inspector General.

The AIDS Healthcare Foundation (AHF) was extremely critical of the decision to fire Parsons. According to AHF President Michael Weinstein, "it appears that John Parsons has been fired merely for doing his job too well. This is a very dark day for the Global Fund and accountability in development funding in general." The Health Care Renewal blog also condemned the decision, urging the Global Fund to make assurances that they "are not out to get whistleblowers, including their own internal watchdogs."

However, on the evening prior to his termination, Parsons was called to a session of the Board to discuss and defend his future position as Inspector General. In a commentary later published in The Global Fund Observer Newsletter, Bernard Rivers, a Senior Fellow within Aidspan, the independent observer of The Global Fund, listed the reasons behind the Board's decision to terminate, further observing that: "When he started to defend his record to the Board at the evening session on 14 November, he still had a few allies on the board. By the time he had finished speaking, he had none, and no Board members voted against the termination."

According to the Associated Press, "the board chairman, Simon Bland, and the head of its audit committee, Graham Joscelyne, each said they were unconcerned whether U.S. lawmakers might perceive the firing as an infringement on the office. Joscelyne would not elaborate on what Parsons did wrong but cited several reviews of him that were not disclosed."

But according to AHF's General Counsel,"the only way Mr. Parsons' efforts could be considered unsatisfactory is if the Board felt he had not found enough waste, fraud, and abuse in Global Fund programs. It is more likely the opposite is true; the Fund was uncomfortable having its shortcomings so exposed."

Following Parson's dismissal, the Board said that it recognised the need to maintain continuity in the work of the audits and investigations currently underway, while it searched for a new Inspector General.

During the two months before his firing, Parsons had asserted in emails to other fund officials that Bland and Joscelyne, who directly oversaw Parsons' office, were trying to weaken his office and prevent the release of information that could cause more bad publicity. ”

Joscelyne emailed Parsons that the committee would more directly manage the office's work, reports and personnel, and that it would reserve the right to assign specific tasks to staff that could replace their planned assignments, according to swissinfo.ch. In response, the emails showed, Parson asserted in emails that Joscelyne and the audit committee backed by Bland were trying to weaken the office by curtailing its field work, ordering changes in personnel and pressuring to reduce the scope and depth of audits and investigations and what is disclosed from them in public reports.

At the November 2012 board meeting, Parsons clashed with Bland and Joscelyne at a closed-door session. Hours later, Parsons emailed Bland and the audit and ethics committee to say it was clear “that you want me out of the Global Fund, and that your true intention is to weaken the function _ simply because you don’t like what we find and report upon.”

“There is no credible basis for criticism of me or my office worthy of this hostility and degree of attack that I have been subject to,” Parsons wrote in an email. “The world will see this for what it truly is _ an intentional effort by you and Graham to weaken the function, diminish the office and penalize me for simply doing my job ...", he wrote. Parsons’ firing was announced later that day.

According to the Government Accountability Project, a whistleblower protection organisation, "when an organization confronts operational shortcomings like this, management and the board have two choices. They can either address the problems and move on, or they can attack the sources of the information – the IG, whistleblowers, auditors – and seek to discredit them. The Global Fund chose the latter course... At GAP, where we have dealt with thousands of whistleblowers over the years, we recognize this as the classic form of retaliation."

== ILO Administrative tribunal outcome ==
On 3 February 2016 the Administrative Tribunal of the International Labour Organization (ILOAT), during its 121st session concluded, in case 3613, in favour of Mr Parsons' appeal to the Tribunal.
