= Michel Kazatchkine =

French diplomat and HIV/AIDS activist

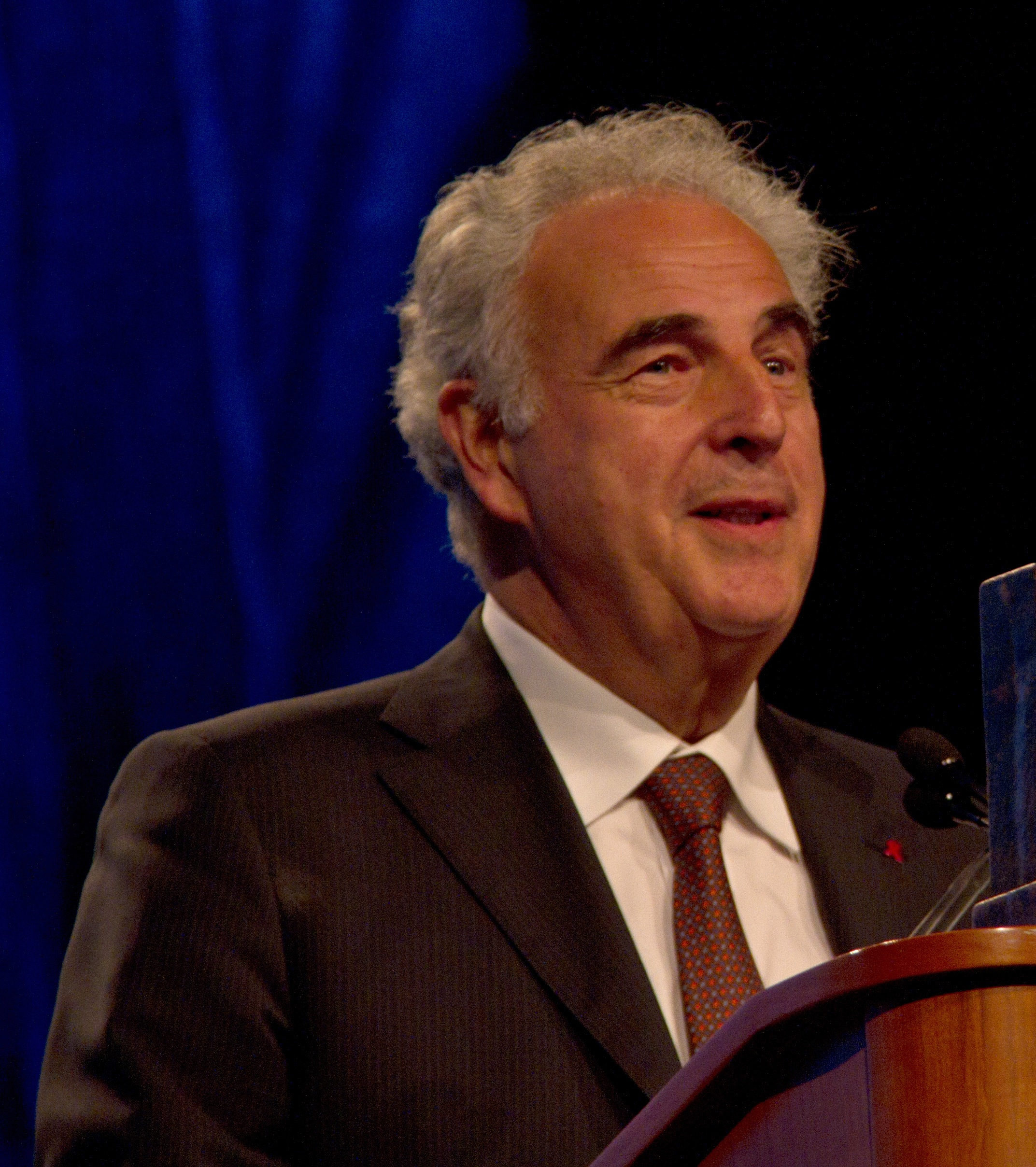
Kazatchkine at "AIDS 2012" sponsored by the International AIDS Society

Michel Kazatchkine is a French physician, diplomat and advocate who is best known for his work in international AIDS treatment issues. From February 2007 to March 2012 he was director of The Global Fund to Fight AIDS, Tuberculosis and Malaria. On July 20, 2012, UN Secretary-General Ban Ki-moon appointed him as his United Nations Special Envoy for HIV/AIDS in Eastern Europe and Central Asia.

Kazatchkine is also a Senior Fellow with the Global Health Program of the Graduate Institute of International and Development Studies in Geneva, and a member of the Global Commission on Drug Policy.

== Early life and education ==
Kazatchkine graduated medical school at Necker-Enfants Malades Hospital in Paris then studied immunology at the Pasteur Institute.

== Career ==
Kazatchkine first treated AIDS patients in 1983, and by 1985 had founded a clinic in Paris specializing in AIDS treatment.

Kazatchkine directed the French National Agency for AIDS Research between 1998 and 2005. He is a member of Médecins du Monde and one of the founders of Nova Dona, which is a non-profit organization giving services to drug users in Paris.

In 2004-2007 Kazatchkine served as a Chair of the World Health Organization's Strategic and Technical Advisory Committee on HIV/AIDS and as a member of the WHO's Scientific and Technical Advisory Group on tuberculosis. In February 2005 he also became France's HIV/AIDS and communicable diseases global ambassador and served in this role until 2007.

From 2005 until 2006 Kazatchkine served The Global Fund to Fight AIDS, Tuberculosis and Malaria as a vice chair. He became the organization's director in 2007, succeeding Richard Feachem. During his time in office, a pledging conference in 2010 raised less than its lowest target of $13 billion over three years. Also, Kazatchkine became the target of allegations of favouritism in funding a HIV awareness campaign co-ordinated by friends of Carla Bruni-Sarkozy, whom he named as the fund's first global Aids ambassador; the charges were later investigated and found baseless by the Fund's board. In late 2011, the Fund's board appointed a general manager to oversee day-to-day operations and a new transition plan, effectively reducing Kazatchkine's role to that of chief fund-raiser and public advocate. In January 2012 the Global Fund officially announced that Kazatchkine will step down in March 2012.

Since 2020, Kazatchkine has been serving as a member of the Independent Panel for Pandemic Preparedness and Response (IPPR), an independent group examining how the WHO and countries handled the COVID-19 pandemic, co-chaired by Helen Clark and Ellen Johnson Sirleaf.

== Other activities ==
- Global Health Centre, Graduate Institute of International and Development Studies, Member of the International Advisory Board (since 2020)
- Open Society Foundations (OSF), Member of Advisory Board on Global Drug Policy
- Tuberculosis Vaccine Initiative (TBVI), Member of the Board
