= Standard Chartered =

British financial services company

Standard Chartered PLC

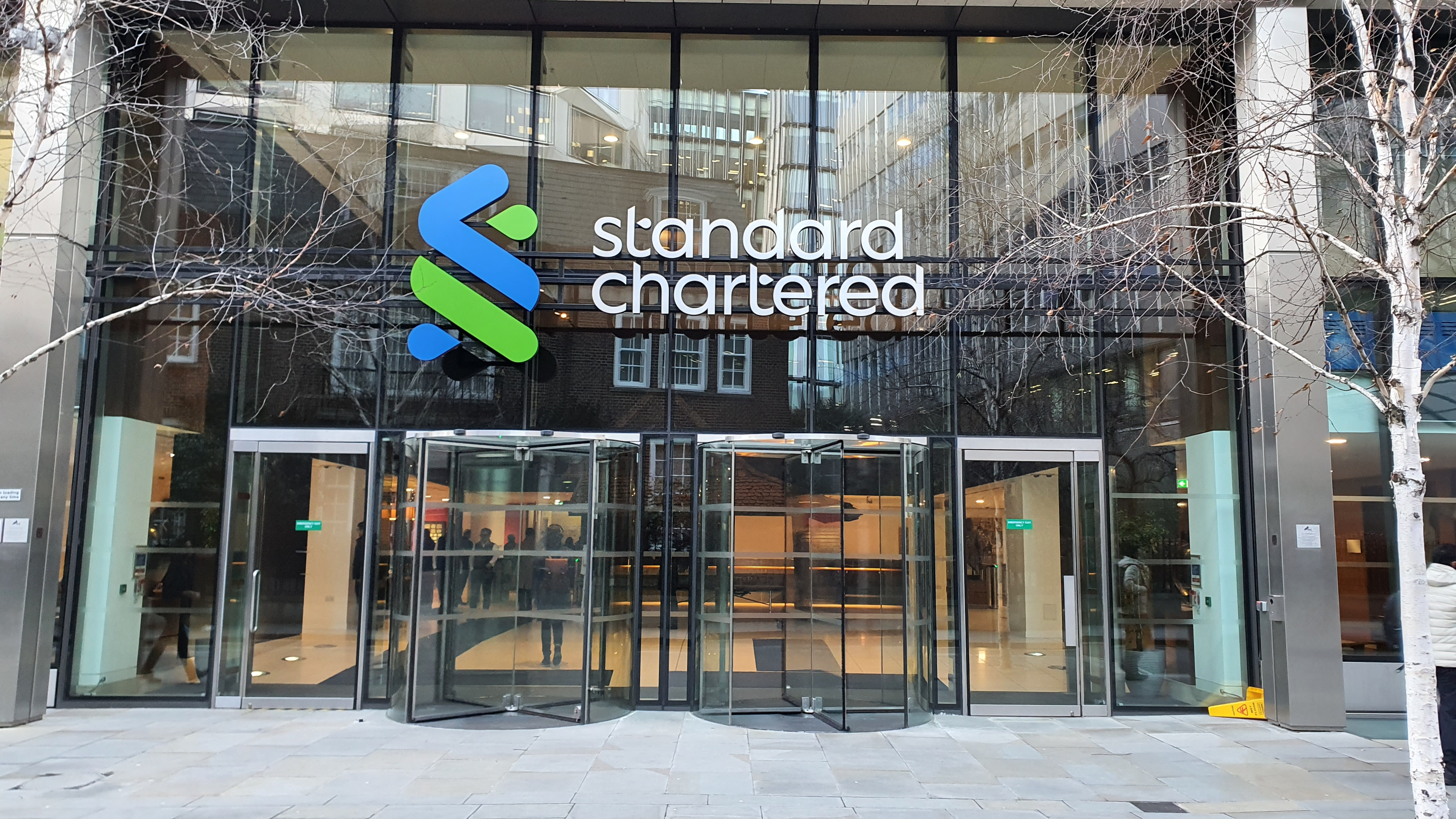
- Headquarters in London
- Type: Public
- Traded as: LSE: STAN; SEHK: 2888; FTSE 100 component (STAN)
- ISIN: GB0004082847
- Industry: Financial services
- Predecessor: Standard Bank; Chartered Bank
- Founded: As Chartered Bank of India, Australia, and China on 29 December 1853; 172 years ago; As Standard Chartered on 18 November 1969; 56 years ago
- Founder: James Wilson with a royal charter (for the Chartered Bank line)
- Headquarters: London, England, UK
- Area served: Worldwide
- Key people: Maria Ramos (group chair); Bill Winters (group chief executive); Pete Burrill (group chief financial officer); Judy Hsu (Wealth and Retail Banking); Roberto Hoornweg (Corporate & Investment Banking)
- Products: Asset management; Banking; Commodities; Credit cards; Equities trading; Insurance; Investment management; Mortgage loans; Mutual funds; Exchange-traded funds; Index funds; Private equity; Risk management; Wealth management
- Revenue: ▲US$20.942 billion (2025)
- Operating income: ▲US$6.963 billion (2025)
- Net income: ▲US$5.097 billion (2025)
- Total assets: ▲US$919.955 billion (2025)
- Total equity: ▲US$54.586 billion (2025)
- Owner: Temasek Holdings (17%)
- Number of employees: 83,000 (2026)
- Website: sc.com

Standard Chartered PLC is a British multinational bank with operations in wealth management, corporate and investment banking, and treasury services.

Despite being headquartered in the United Kingdom, it does not conduct retail banking in the UK, and around 90% of its profits come from Asia, Africa, and the Middle East.

Standard Chartered has a primary listing on the London Stock Exchange and is a constituent of the FTSE 100 Index. It has secondary listings on the Hong Kong Stock Exchange, the National Stock Exchange of India, and OTC Markets Group Pink. Its largest shareholder is the Government of Singapore–owned Temasek Holdings. The Financial Stability Board considers it a systemically important bank.

The name Standard Chartered comes from the names of the two banks that merged in 1969 to create it: The Chartered Bank of India, Australia and China, and Standard Bank of British South Africa.

== History ==
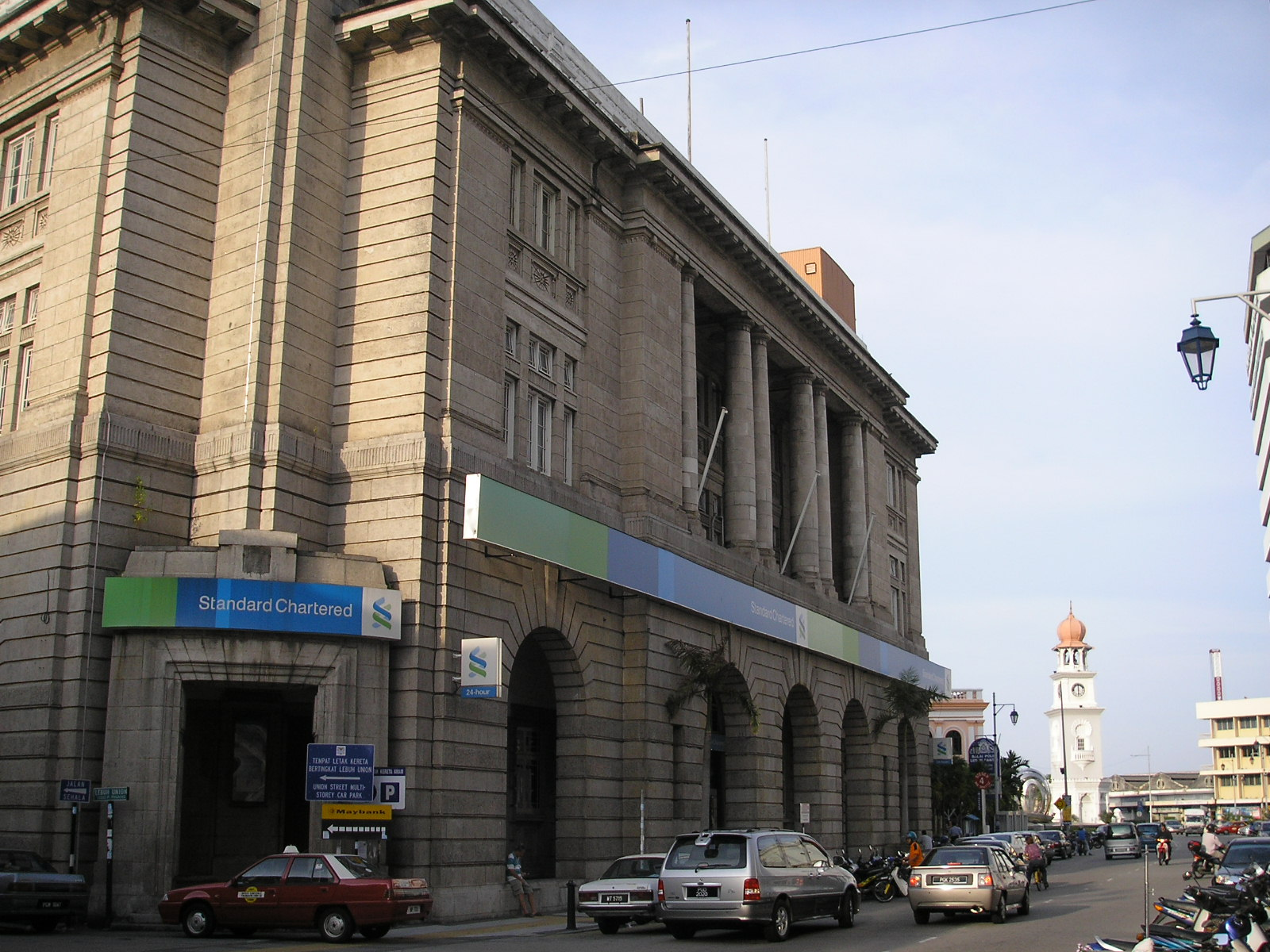
Standard Chartered Bank Building in George Town, Penang, Malaysia

=== Predecessors ===
==== Chartered Bank ====
The Chartered Bank began when Queen Victoria granted a royal charter to Scotsman James Wilson in 1853. Chartered opened its first branches in Bombay, Calcutta, and Shanghai in 1858; branches in Hong Kong and Singapore followed in 1859. The bank started issuing banknotes denominated in Hong Kong dollars in 1862.

==== Standard Bank ====
The Standard Bank was a British bank founded in the Cape Province of South Africa in 1862 by Scot, John Paterson. Having established a considerable number of branches Standard was prominent in financing the development of the diamond fields of Kimberley from 1867 and later extended its network further north to the new town of Johannesburg when gold was discovered there in 1885. Half the output of the second largest gold field in the world passed through the Standard Bank on its way to London. Standard expanded widely in Africa over the years, but from 1883 to 1962 was formally known as the Standard Bank of South Africa. In 1962 the bank changed its name to Standard Bank Limited, and the South African operations became a separate subsidiary that took the parent bank's previous name, Standard Bank of South Africa Ltd.

=== 1969 to 2000 ===
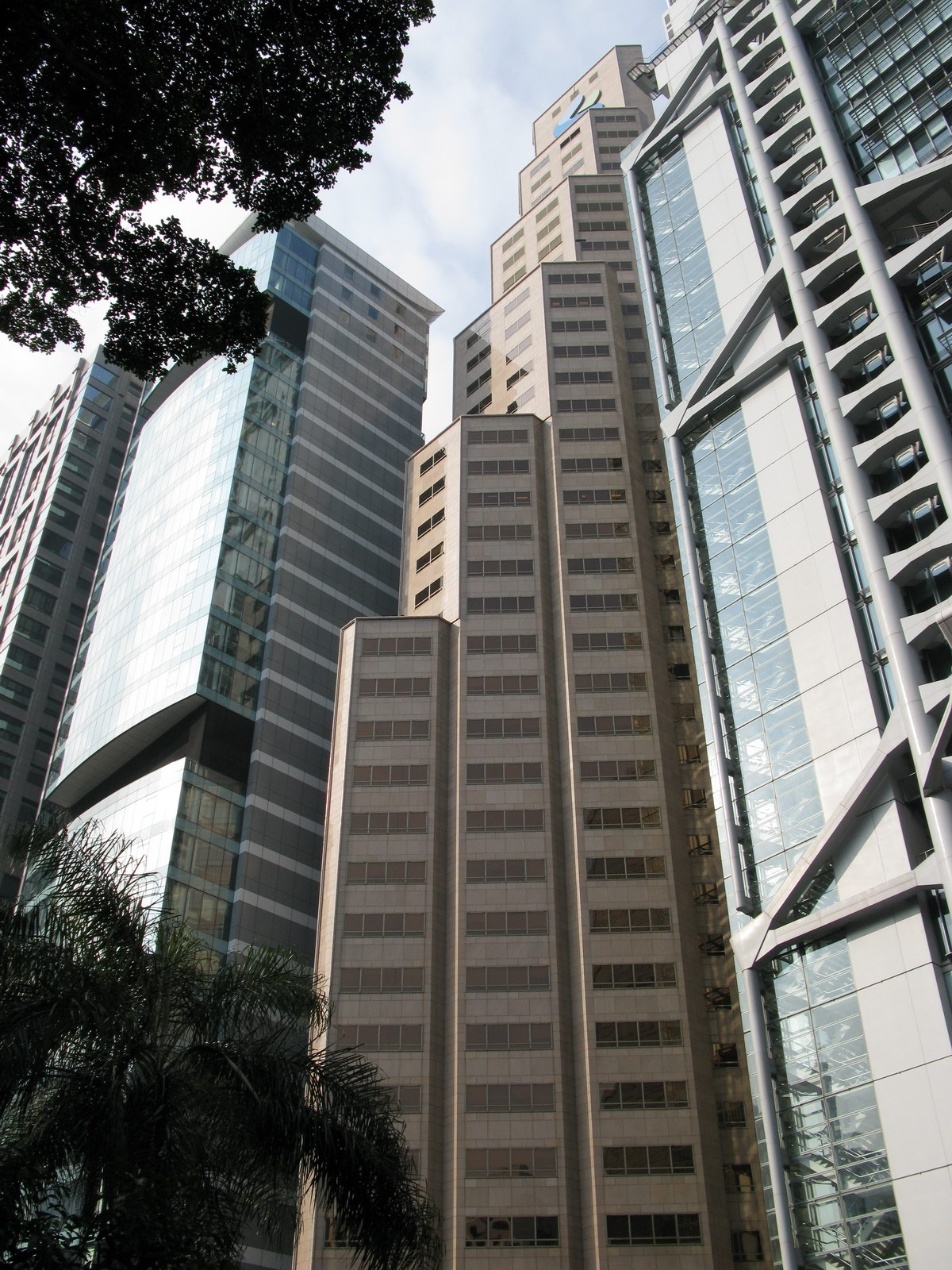
Standard Chartered Bank Building in Central, Hong Kong

Both banks acquired other smaller banks along the way and spread their networks further. In 1969, the banks decided to merge and to counterbalance their network by expanding in Europe and the United States, while continuing expansion in their traditional markets in Asia and Africa.

In 1986, Lloyds made a hostile takeover bid for the Group. The bid was defeated; however, it spurred Standard Chartered into a period of change, including a series of divestments notably in the US and South Africa. It sold Union Bank to Bank of Tokyo and United Bank of Arizona to Citicorp.

In 1986, a business consortium purchased a 35% stake to fend off Lloyds. A member of this consortium was Singaporean property tycoon Khoo Teck Puat, who purchased 5% of the bank's shares, which he later increased to 13.4%.

In 1987, Standard Chartered sold its remaining interests in the South African bank; since then the Standard Bank Group has been a separate entity.

In 1992, scandal broke when banking regulators charged several employees of Standard Chartered in Mumbai with illegally diverting depositors' funds to speculate in the stock market. Fines by Indian regulators and provisions for losses cost the bank almost £350 million, at that time fully a third of its capital.

In 1994, London's Sunday Times reported that an executive in the bank's metals division had bribed officials in Malaysia and the Philippines to win business. The bank, in a statement on 18 July 1994, acknowledged that there were "discrepancies in expense claims [that] ... included gifts to individuals in certain countries to facilitate business, a practice contrary to bank rules".

In 1994, the Hong Kong Securities and Futures Commission found Standard Chartered's Asian investment bank to have illegally helped to artificially support the price of new shares it had underwritten for six companies from July 1991 to March 1993. The bank admitted the offence, apologized, and reorganized its brokerage units. The commission banned the bank from underwriting IPOs in Hong Kong for nine months.

In 1997, Standard Chartered sold Mocatta Bullion and Base Metals, its metals division, to Toronto-based Scotiabank for US$26 million.

Standard Chartered's Asian investment banking operations never recovered. In 2000, the bank closed them down.

=== 2000 to 2010 ===
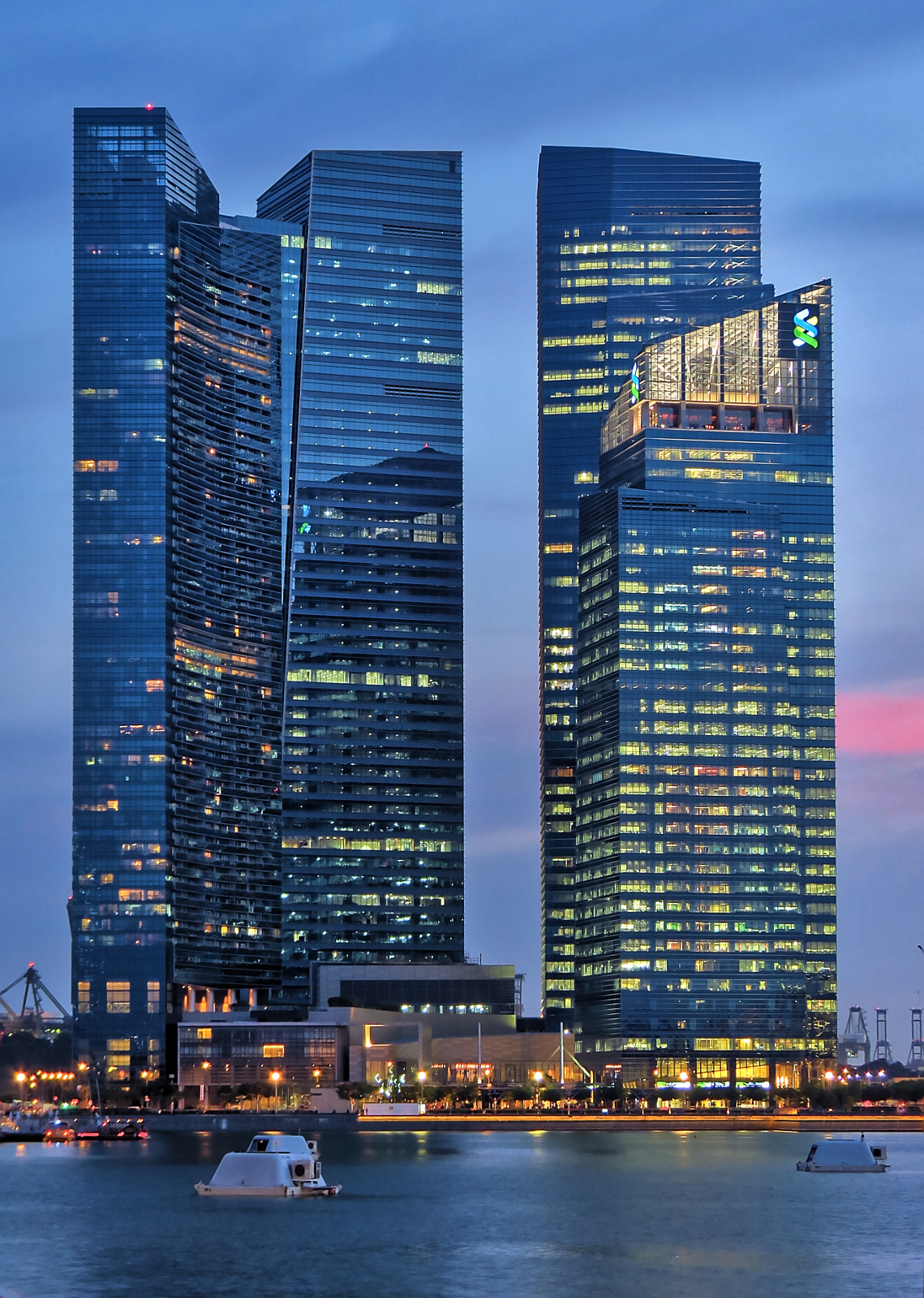
Standard Chartered Singapore corporate office in Marina Bay Financial Centre, Singapore

Standard Chartered logo from 2002 to 2021

In 2000, Standard Chartered acquired Grindlays Bank from ANZ, increasing its presence in private banking and further expanding its operations in India and Pakistan. Standard Chartered retained Grindlays' private banking operations in London and Luxembourg, as well as the subsidiary in Jersey, all of which were integrated into its own private bank. This now serves high-net-worth customers in Hong Kong, Dubai, and Johannesburg under the name Standard Chartered Grindlays Offshore Financial Services.

Leading to the incorporation of Standard Chartered (Hong Kong) on 1 July 2004, the Legislative Council of Hong Kong amended Legal Tender Notes Issue Ordinance. The amendment replaced Standard Chartered Bank with its newly incorporated subsidiary - Standard Chartered Bank (Hong Kong) Ltd - as one of the note-issuing banks in Hong Kong. The same year, Standard Chartered Bank and Astra International (an Indonesian conglomerate, a subsidiary of Jardine Matheson) took over PermataBank and in 2006, both shareholders increased their joint ownership to 89.01%. With 276 branches and 549 ATMs in 55 cities throughout Indonesia, PermataBank has the second largest branch network in Standard Chartered organization.

On 15 April 2005, the bank acquired Korea First Bank, beating HSBC in the bid. The bank has since rebranded the branches as SC First Bank. Standard Chartered completed the integration of its Bangkok branch and Standard Chartered Nakornthon Bank in October, renaming the new entity Standard Chartered Bank (Thailand). Standard Chartered also formed strategic alliances with Fleming Family & Partners to expand private wealth management in Asia and the Middle East, and acquired stakes in ACB in Vietnam, Travelex, American Express Bank (Bangladesh), and Bohai Bank (China). The largest shareholder, billionaire Khoo Teck Puat, died in 2004; and two years later, on 28 March 2006, the Singapore state-owned private investment firm, Temasek, became the bank's largest shareholder when it bought the 11.55% stake held by Khoo Teck Puat's estate.

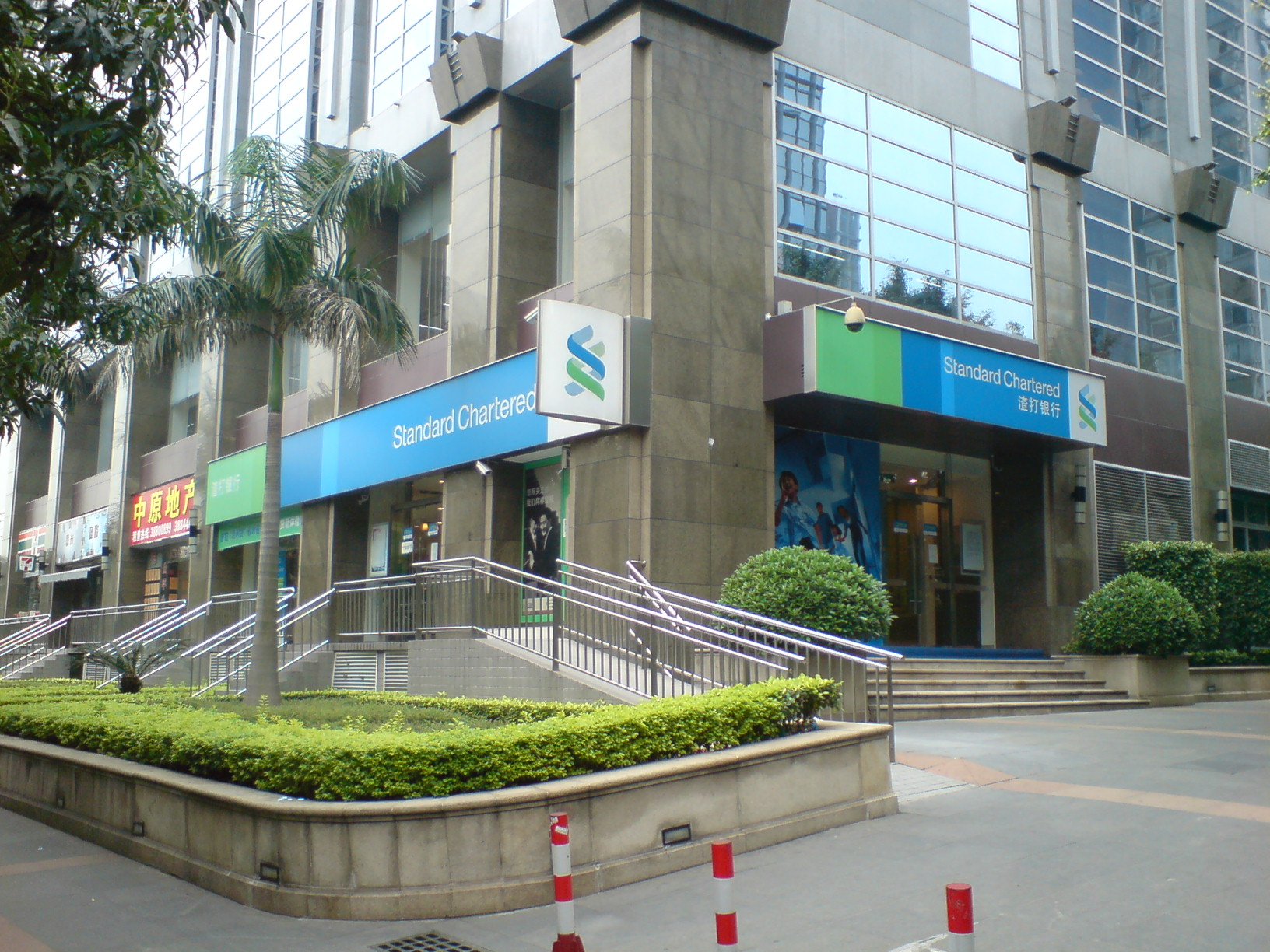
Standard Chartered Bank China in Guangzhou

On 9 August 2006, Standard Chartered announced it had acquired an 81% shareholding in the Union Bank of Pakistan in a deal ultimately worth $511 million. This deal represented the first acquisition by a foreign firm of a Pakistani bank. The merged bank, Standard Chartered Bank (Pakistan), is now Pakistan's sixth largest bank.

On 22 October 2006, Standard Chartered announced that it had received tenders for more than 51% of the issued share capital of Hsinchu International Bank ("Hsinchu"), established in 1948 in Hsinchu, Taiwan.

In 2007, Standard Chartered opened its Private Banking global headquarters in Singapore.

On 23 August 2007, Standard Chartered entered into an agreement to buy a 49% share of an Indian brokerage firm (UTI Securities) for $36 million in cash from Securities Trading Corporation of India Ltd., with the option to raise its stake to 75% in 2008, and, if both partners were in agreement, to 100% by 2010.

On 29 February 2008, Standard Chartered PLC announced it had received all the required approvals leading to the completion of its acquisition of American Express Bank Ltd (AEB) from the American Express Company (AXP). The total cash consideration for the acquisition is US$823 million.

On 13 November 2008, Standard Chartered Bank (Hong Kong) Limited, entered into an agreement with JPMorgan Cazenove to acquire 100% of Cazenove Asia Limited, an Asian equity capital markets, corporate finance, and institutional brokerage business.

On 27 November 2009, Dow Jones Financial News reported that Dubai will restructure its largest corporate entity. Among international banks, Standard Chartered has one of the largest loan portfolios in the Dubai market and the UAE as a whole, estimated to be $7.77 billion in total. This amounts to 4.2% of Standard Chartered's total loans outstanding. Other impacted banks included HSBC, Barclays, and RBS. The bank stated that any impairment arising from this exposure would not be material.

=== 2010 to present ===
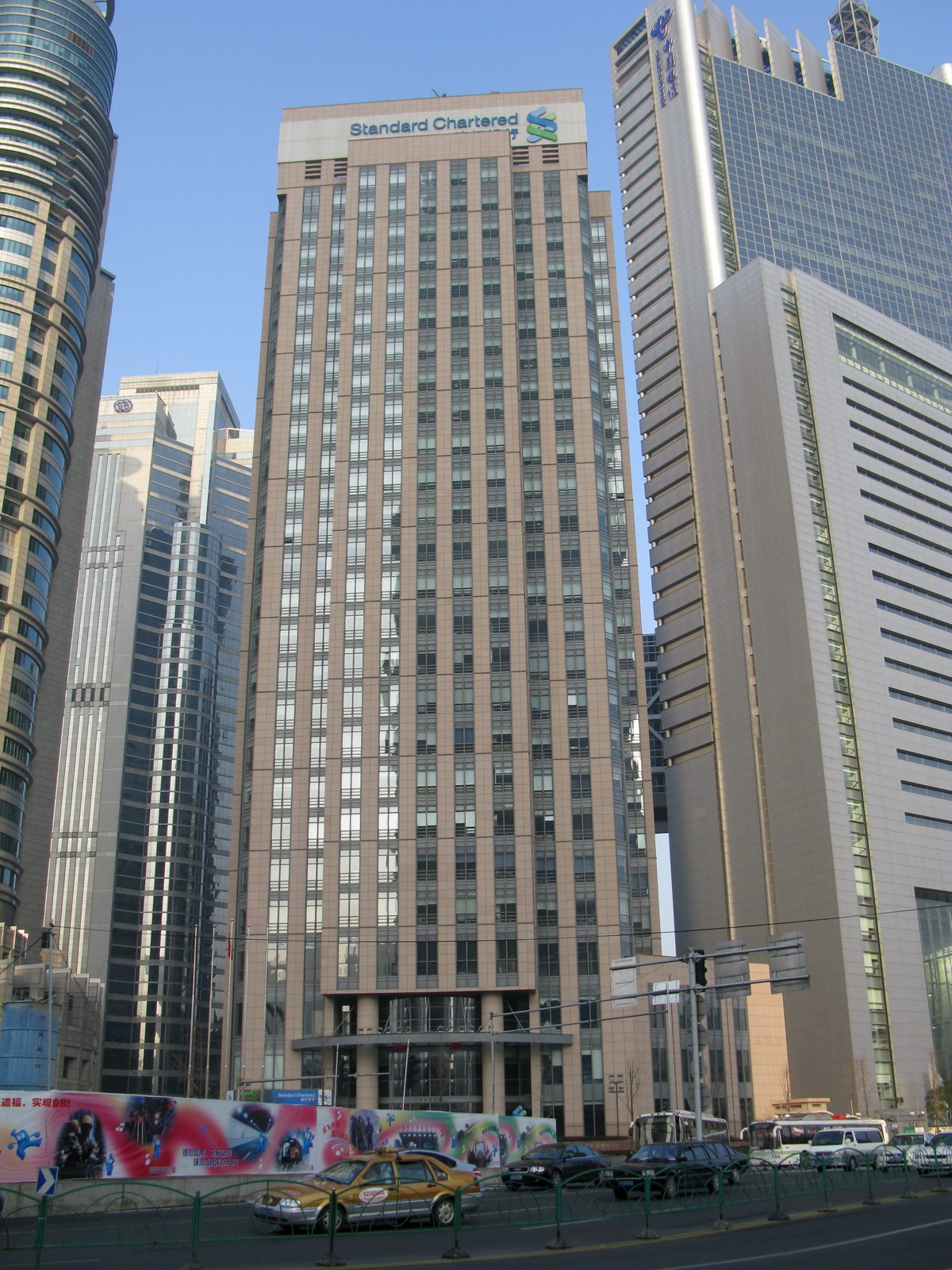
Standard Chartered Bank Tower in Lujiazui, Pudong, Shanghai, People's Republic of China

Standard Chartered announced an agreement on 27 April 2010 to buy the African custody business from Barclays PLC. On 13 May 2010, Standard Chartered PLC launched the first-ever Indian Depository Receipt "IDR" offer.

On 17 June 2010, Standard Chartered Bank and the Agricultural Bank of China (ABC) entered into a strategic alliance meant to strengthened their strategic partnership and identify joint business opportunities. Joint business and cooperation task forces were set up in October that year to define the direction of the partnership and explore joint ventures. The committee was to be co-chaired by Peter Sands, CEO of Standard Chartered, and Zhang Yun, President of ABC.

In December 2010, Standard Chartered was recognised as the Global Bank of the Year in The Banker's Bank of the Year 2010 awards. Standard Chartered also was named The Banker's inaugural winners of the Global and European Transaction Bank of the Year awards in September 2014, largely "on the basis of its work in emerging markets, particularly Asia".

In January 2015, the company announced that it was exiting the money-losing "equity capital markets business completely", "becoming one of the first global banks" to do so. In November that year, the bank announced that it would cut 15,000 jobs, including one thousand senior jobs, "from managing director up to board executives". The cuts followed a change of CEO after profit warnings and money laundering fines in the first half of the year.

In 2016, Standard Chartered announced that it would stop providing loans to the midstream segment of the diamonds and jewellery industries. The announcement was the result of a review of the bank's involvement in risky business sectors. In 2017, the bank was reported to have lost $400 million on risky diamond debt on a portfolio of loans that was once worth $3 billion. Owing to defaults of jewellery and diamond companies from 2013 onwards, Standard Chartered is currently estimated to have $1.7 billion of diamond debt still to be repaid.

The company received criticism in April 2017 from the Institutional Shareholder Services (ISS). The investor advisory firm told shareholders it was concerned that targets set for the top bosses in the bank's long-term incentive plan (LTIP) were not demanding enough. Bill Winters, the chief executive, stands to net share awards with a face value of as much as £4.4m from the scheme, while Andy Halford, the chief financial officer, could receive £2.7m.

In January 2022, Standard Chartered announced an agreement to acquire 100% ownership of RBC Investor Services Trust Hong Kong Limited from RBC Investor & Treasury Services, expanding its custodian business to MPF and ORSO schemes trusteeship business in Hong Kong.

In February 2025, Standard Chartered, Animoca Brands and Hong Kong Telecom establish joint venture to issue a HKD-backed stablecoin.

In 2026, Standard Chartered announced plans to acquire digital asset custodian Zodia Custody.

==== Money-laundering charges ====
On 6 August 2012, the New York Department of Financial Services (DFS), led by Benjamin Lawsky, accused Standard Chartered of hiding $250 billion in transactions involving Iran, labelling it a "rogue institution". The bank was ordered to appear and defend its actions, or risk losing its licence to operate in the state of New York. The DFS said it had documents showing a cover up of transactions allegedly used to fund terrorist groups in the Middle East.

On 14 August 2012, Lawsky announced that the DFS and Standard Chartered reached a settlement that allows the bank to keep its licence to operate in New York. According to the terms of the settlement, the bank agreed to pay a $340 million fine.

The bank agreed to install a monitor to oversee the bank's money laundering controls for at least two years, and appoint "permanent officials who will audit the bank's internal procedures to prevent offshore money laundering". The monitor will report directly to the DFS. Lawsky's statement said "the parties have agreed that the conduct at issue involved transactions of at least $250bn." The bank issued a statement confirming that a settlement with the DFS had been reached and that "a formal agreement containing the detailed terms of the settlement is expected to be concluded shortly".

Other US agencies—including the Federal Reserve, the Federal Bureau of Investigation, the Treasury Department, and the Justice Department—had also begun investigations into the laundering allegations and were reportedly taken off guard by the speed of the settlement.

The Treasury stated that its own investigation of Standard Chartered will continue. Several financial analysts predicted that, due to its strong financial position, the bank would be able to easily cover the $900 million fine without having to raise extra capital.

On 6 August 2014, Lawsky was reported to be preparing a new action against Standard Chartered over computer system breakdowns and was "discussing a potential settlement".

On 19 August 2014, the bank was fined $300 million by the New York Department of Financial Services for breach of money-laundering compliance related to potentially high-risk transactions involving Standard Chartered clients in Hong Kong and the UAE. The bank issued a statement accepting responsibility and regretting the deficiencies, at the same time noting the ruling would not jeopardize its U.S. licences.

In April 2019, it was reported that Standard Chartered may have to pay approximately $1 billion to settle its ongoing investigations in the US and UK. Earlier in February the company had set aside $900 million towards resolution of violations of U.S. sanctions and forex trading regulations. The company also faces a penalty of roughly $134 million from the United Kingdom's Financial Conduct Authority related to historical financial crime controls which takes the amount to over $1 billion.

In March 2025, Standard Chartered launched an exclusive investment platform club for its ultra-high-net-worth clients as part of its business restructuing switching focus towards wealth management.

== Financial technology ==
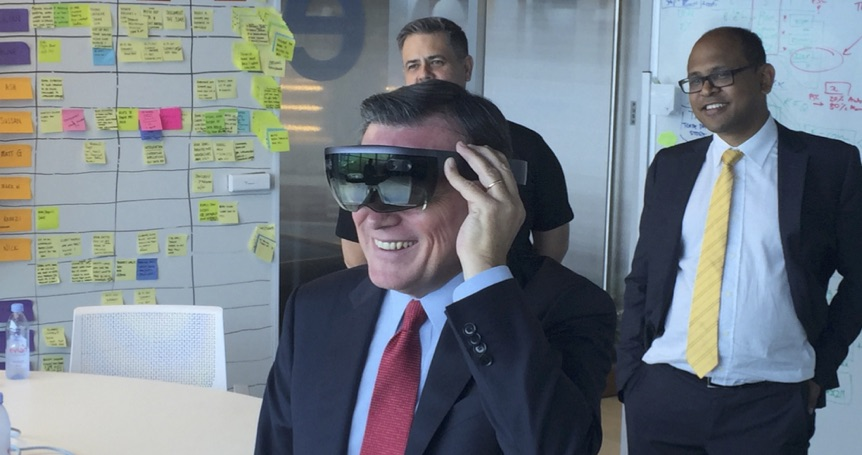
Group chairman José Viñals explores Augmented Reality with chief data officer Shameek Kundu at the bank's eXellerator Lab in Singapore.

=== Standard Chartered Breeze ===
Standard Chartered Breeze is a mobile banking application for the iPhone & iPad that can also be used on the computer. It is largely similar to the online banking services offered by other banks, with the exception of its function to issue electronic bank cheques. Launched in the summer of 2010 and aggressively marketed, the reviews have been generally positive. In addition, it has attracted an uncommon amount of attention due to many innovative marketing strategies it used to promote its product, mostly focusing on social media. Standard Chartered Breeze organised a blogger's meet for bloggers to preview Breeze, and its Twitter campaign to give away a free iPad was extremely successful.

=== SuperCharger FinTech Accelerator ===
Standard Chartered's primary engagement with the fintech community is focused in Hong Kong, working closely with and co-ordinated by 'The eXellerator'. The SuperCharger FinTech Accelerator, along with main partners, Standard Chartered Bank (a founding member) and Fidelity International, has twice conducted programmes enabling international growth-stage companies to expand their operations within Asia. Standard Chartered Bank has initiated proof of concept projects with two companies: Bambu and KYC Chain.

== Sponsorship ==
In September 2009, it was announced that Standard Chartered had agreed to become the main sponsor of Liverpool Football Club for the period between July 2010 and the end of the 2013–14 football season, taking shirt sponsorship and various other branding rights. The sponsorship has been extended multiple times. First in 2013 to the end of the 2015–16 season, next in 2015 through the 2018–19 season, then again, in May 2018 that extends through the 2022–23 season and finally, in July 2022 that runs until the end of the 2026–27 season. In 2018, the deal was estimated to be worth around £50 million per year by City A.M., making it the joint-third most valuable sponsorship deal in the Premier League alongside Arsenal's deal with Emirates and Chelsea's deal with Yokohama. Standard Chartered is also the lead sponsor of the Singapore Marathon.

In January 2026, Standard Chartered signed a multi-year partnership deal with Formula One and F1 Academy.

== Social responsibility ==
The Priority Academy program was created in 2006 by the bank, with educational programmes including a study tour of Shanghai, a summer internship programme and a study seminar in the United States. The program donated $250,000 to Chan Yik Hei, a science amateur who won the Intel International Science and Engineering Fair, for his studies at the Hong Kong University of Science and Technology.

== Leadership ==
- Group chair: Maria Ramos (since May 2025)
- Group chief executive: Bill Winters (since June 2015)

=== List of former group chairs ===
1. Sir Cyril Hawker (1969–1974)
2. The Lord Barber (1974–1987)
3. Sir Peter Graham (1987–1988)
4. Rodney Galpin (1988–1993)
5. Sir Patrick Gillam (1993–2003)
6. Bryan Sanderson (2003–2006)
7. The Lord Davies (2006–2009)
8. Sir John Peace (2009–2016)
9. José Viñals (2016–2025)

=== List of former group chief executives ===
Prior to 1973, management integration was still ongoing and the Standard Bank and Chartered Bank each had their own separate executives; Ronald Lane and H. R. Reed from the two banks first joined as co-managing directors in 1973, with Lane becoming sole managing director in 1975.

1. Ronald Lane and H. R. Reed (1973–1974)
2. Ronald Lane (1975–1977)
3. Sir Peter Graham (1977–1983)
4. Sir Michael McWilliam (1983–1988)
5. Rodney Galpin (1988–1992)
6. Sir Malcolm Williamson (1993–1998)
7. Rana Talwar (1998–2001)
8. The Lord Davies (2001–2006)
9. Peter Sands (2006–2015)

=== Notable former employees ===
- Joseph Chan, Under Secretary for Financial Services and the Treasury
- Norman Chan, 2nd Chief Executive of the Hong Kong Monetary Authority
- Mervyn Davies, Baron Davies of Abersoch, member of the House of Lords and former Minister of State for Trade, Investment, and Business
- Sir John Major, former Prime Minister of the United Kingdom
- Palanivel Thiagarajan, former Finance Minister of Tamil Nadu
- Peter Wong, chairman and former CEO of The Hongkong and Shanghai Banking Corporation

== Controversies ==
=== Breach of sanctions fines (2012) ===
In August 2012, Standard Chartered agreed to pay $340 million to the New York State Department of Financial Services over charges that the bank worked with the government of Iran to hide $250 billion in transactions in order to evade sanctions.

In December 2012, Standard Chartered agreed to pay a $327 million fine for having hidden similar transactions with Iran, Myanmar, Libya, and Sudan.

=== Money laundering, breach of sanctions fine (2019) ===
On 9 April 2019, Standard Chartered paid $1.1 billion to the United Kingdom Government and the United States of America's Department of the Treasury over deficiencies in the bank's money laundering control regime and for violating financial sanctions against Myanmar, Zimbabwe, Cuba, Sudan, Syria, and Iran.

=== OFSI fine (2020) ===
In April 2020, Standard Chartered was fined £20.4 million by the UK's Office of Financial Sanctions Implementation for loans to a Turkish bank DenizBank, which fell under E.U. financial sanctions on Russia due to its majority ownership by Russian bank Sberbank of Russia.

=== Indian bank takeover fine (2020) ===
In August 2020, Enforcement Directorate fined Standard Chartered ₹100 crore ($13.6 million) for foreign exchange rule violations in its 2007 takeover of Tamilnad Mercantile Bank Limited.

=== Delay of reporting fraud fine (2021) ===
In January 2021, the Reserve Bank of India issued a fine of ₹2 crore of Standard Chartered Bank-India for delays in its mandatory regulatory fraud reporting.

=== South African rand manipulation (2023) ===
In November 2023, after an 8-year litigation, the Competition Commission fined Standard Chartered R42.7 million rand for various offences that related to manipulating the USD/ZAR currency pair which included the fixing of bids, offers, bid-offer spreads, the spot exchange rate and the fixing of the exchange rate at the FIX. Standard Chartered assumed liability for its actions in manipulating the rand between 2007 and 2013.

=== Violations in relation to sanctions against Iran ===
Documents filed to a New York court in June 2024 claim that thousands of transactions worth more than $100 billion were carried out by the bank from 2008 to 2013 in breach of international sanctions against Iran. The filings, which were provided by former SCB employee and whistleblower Julian Knight, state that the bank "facilitated many billions of dollars in banking transactions for Iran, numerous international terror groups, and the front companies for those groups." The bank had previously announced that it had ceased all business with Iranian customers in 2007.

=== Carmichael Coal Mine ===
In 2015, Standard Chartered was widely criticised for its $12bn funding of the controversial Carmichael Coal Mine, with a campaign led by Greenpeace calling for it to quit the project. The bank subsequently withdrew from the deal.

== See also ==
- Banknotes of the Hong Kong dollar
- List of banks in the United Kingdom
- Too big to fail
