= The Global Fund to Fight AIDS, Tuberculosis and Malaria =

International organization

- Founded: January 28, 2002 (first Board of Directors meeting)
- Purpose: Accelerating the end of AIDS, tuberculosis and malaria as epidemics
- Location: Le Grand-Saconnex, Switzerland
- Key people: Peter Sands, (Executive Director, March 2018 – present)
- Website: www.theglobalfund.org

The Global Fund, officially The Global Fund to Fight AIDS, Tuberculosis and Malaria is an international financing and partnership organization that aims to "attract, leverage and invest additional resources to end the epidemics of HIV/AIDS, tuberculosis and malaria to support attainment of the Sustainable Development Goals established by the United Nations". In June 2001 the United Nations General Assembly endorsed the creation of a global fund to fight HIV/AIDS. This multistakeholder international organization maintains its secretariat in Geneva, Switzerland and began operations in January 2002. From January 2006, while being a 501(c)(3) organization, it received status under International Organizations Immunities Act in the United States.

The Global Fund is the world's largest financier of AIDS, TB, and malaria prevention, treatment, and care programs. As of June 2019, the organization had disbursed more than US$41.6 billion to support these programs. According to the organization, in 2018 it helped finance the distribution of 227 million insecticide-treated nets to combat malaria, provided anti-tuberculosis treatment for 7.1 million people, supported 25 million people on antiretroviral therapy for AIDS, and since its founding saved 65 million lives worldwide.

The Global Fund is a financing mechanism rather than an implementing agency. Programs are implemented by in-country partners such as ministries of health, while the Global Fund secretariat, whose staff only have an office in Geneva, monitor the programs. Implementation is overseen by Country Coordinating Mechanisms, country-level committees consisting of in-country stakeholders that need to include, according to Global Fund requirements, a broad spectrum of representatives from government, NGOs, faith-based organizations, the private sector, and people living with the diseases. This system has kept the Global Fund secretariat smaller than other international bureaucracies. The model has also raised concerns about conflict of interest, as some of the stakeholders represented on the Country Coordinating Mechanisms may also receive money from the Global Fund, either as grant recipients, sub-recipients, private persons (e.g. for travel or participation at seminars) or contractors.

In January 2025, President Donald Trump's administration implemented a comprehensive freeze on new funding for most foreign aid programs, including contributions to the Global Fund to Fight AIDS, Tuberculosis and Malaria. This action has raised concerns about the potential impact on global health initiatives, as the U.S. has been a significant donor to the Global Fund. In response, the Global Fund is seeking to increase private sector contributions to mitigate potential shortfalls resulting from reduced government funding.

== Creation ==
At the end of the 20th century, international political will to improve coordinated efforts to fight the world's deadliest infectious diseases began to materialize. US Ambassador to the UN Richard Holbrooke recognized early on that diseases such as AIDS and Malaria posed as national security threat and advocated for policy that would shore up against those threats. Through various multilateral fora, consensus around creating a new international financial vehicle to combat these diseases emerged. In this context the World Health Organization (WHO) called for a "Massive Attack on Diseases of Poverty" in December 1999. The original concept suggested tackling "malaria, tuberculosis, unsafe pregnancy, AIDS, diarrheal diseases, acute respiratory infections and measles". This list would steadily narrow to only include the three diseases the Global Fund fights today: HIV/AIDS, TB, and malaria.

In April 2001, in Abuja, Nigeria at a summit of African leaders, United Nations Secretary General Kofi Annan made the first explicit public call by a highly visible global leader for this new funding mechanism, proposing "the creation of a Global Fund, dedicated to the battle against HIV/AIDS and other infectious diseases". Secretary General Annan made the first contribution to the Global Fund in 2001. Having just been named the recipient of the 2001 Philadelphia Liberty Medal, Annan announced he would donate his US$100,000 award to the Global Fund "war chest" he had just proposed creating. In June 2001 the United Nations General Assembly endorsed the creation of a global fund to fight HIV/AIDS.

The G8 formally endorsed the call for the creation of the Global Fund at its summit in July 2001 in Genoa, Italy, although pledges were significantly lower than the US$7 billion to US$10 billion annually Kofi Annan insisted was needed. According to the G8's final communique, "At Okinawa last year, we pledged to make a quantum leap in the fight against infectious diseases and to break the vicious cycle between disease and poverty. To meet that commitment and to respond to the appeal of the UN General Assembly, we have launched with the UN Secretary-General a new Global Fund to fight HIV/AIDS, malaria and tuberculosis. We are determined to make the Fund operational before the end of the year. We have committed $1.3 billion. The Fund will be a public-private partnership and we call on other countries, the private sector, foundations, and academic institutions to join with their own contributions – financially, in kind and through shared expertise."

The Global Fund's initial 18-member policy-setting board held its first meeting in January 2002, and issued its first call for proposals. The first secretariat was established in January 2002 with Paul Ehmer serving as team leader, soon replaced by Anders Nordstrom of Sweden who became the organization's interim executive director. By the time the Global Fund Secretariat became operational, the organization had received US$1.9 billion in pledges.

Microsoft founder Bill Gates (through the Bill & Melinda Gates Foundation) was one of the first donors to provide seed money of US$100 million for the partnership. In March 2002, a panel of international public health experts was named to begin reviewing project proposals that same month. In April 2002, the Global Fund awarded its first batch of grants – worth US$378 million – to fight the three diseases in 31 countries.

== Outcomes ==
The Global Fund's investments have reduced deaths from HIV, tuberculosis, and malaria by 61% since 2002, saving 65 million lives. Recent efforts include lowering the cost of key treatments for drug-resistant TB by 55% and first-line HIV medications by 25%, while introducing a more effective insecticide-treated mosquito net. The Fund's initiatives, including supporting 25 million people on antiretroviral medication, have saved $85 billion by reducing hospitalization and outpatient visits. Implementation evidence to support the scale-up of antiretroviral therapies in resource limited settings and has been instrumental in advocating for the protection of U.S. global health funding to combat these diseases effectively.

== Fundraising ==
Since the Global Fund was created in 2002, public sector contributions have constituted 95 percent of all financing raised; the remaining 5 percent comes from the private sector or other financing initiatives such as Product Red. The Global Fund states that from 2002 to July 2019, more than 60 donor governments pledged a total of US$51.2 billion and paid US$45.8 billion. From 2001 through 2018, the largest contributor to fund was global health funding by the United States, followed by France, the United Kingdom, Germany, and Japan. The donor nations with the largest percent of gross national income contributed to the fund from 2008 through 2010 were Sweden, Norway, France, the United Kingdom, the Netherlands, and Spain. Per law in the United States, funding for the Global Fund cannot exceed one-third of total contributions from all donors to the Global Fund.

The Global Fund typically raises and spends funds during three-year "replenishment" fund-raising periods. Its first replenishment was launched in 2005, the second in 2007, the third in 2010, the fourth in 2013, and the fifth in 2016. As part of the public-private partnership, all stakeholders play an important role in resource mobilisation efforts – including communities and civil society organisations. In 2011, at the 4th Partnership Forum held in São Paulo, Brazil, the Global Fund Advocates Network (GFAN) was founded. Following which regional entities – GFAN Africa and GFAN Asia-Pacific were also established.

Alarms were raised prior to the third replenishment meeting in October 2010 about a looming deficit in funding, which would have led to people undergoing ARV treatment losing access, increasing the chance of them becoming resistant to treatment. UNAIDS Executive Director Michel Sidibé dubbed the scenario of a funding deficit an "HIV Nightmare". The Global Fund stated it needed at least US$20 billion for the third replenishment (covering programs 2011–2013), and US$13 billion just to "allow for the continuation of funding of existing programs". Ultimately, US$11.8 billion was mobilized at the third replenishment meeting, with the United States being the largest contributor, followed by France, Germany, and Japan. The Global Fund stated the US$1.2 billion lack in funding would "lead to difficult decisions in the next three years that could slow down the effort to beat the three diseases".

In November 2011, the organization's board cancelled all new grants for 2012, only having enough money to support existing grants. However, following the Global Fund's May 2012 board meeting, it announced that an additional US$1.6 billion would be available in the 2012–2014 period for investment in programs.

In December 2013, the fourth replenishment meeting was held in Washington, D.C. US$12 billion was pledged in contributions from 25 countries, as well as the European Commission, private foundations, corporations, and faith-based organizations for the 2014–2016 period. It was the largest amount ever committed to fighting the three diseases.

The fifth replenishment meeting took place in September 2016 in Montreal, Canada, and was hosted by Canadian Prime Minister Justin Trudeau. Donors pledged US$12.9 billion (at 2016 exchange rates) for the 2017–2019 period.

France held the sixth replenishment meeting in 2019 in Lyon, hosted by President Emmanuel Macron raising US$14.02 billion for 2020–2022.

The seventh replenishment meeting was hosted by the United States on 19–21 September 2022 in New York City hosted by President Joe Biden, announced by Secretary of State Antony Blinken. The final total was a new record amount of funding, US$15.7 billion.

The Global Fund's Eighth Replenishment Summit was held on Friday, 21 November 2025, in Johannesburg, South Africa. At the summit, partners pledged US$11.34 billion for a more country-led and adaptable approach to global health funding.

== Leadership ==
Richard Feachem was named the Global Fund's first executive director in April 2002 and faced early criticism from activists for stating the Global Fund has "plenty" of money to start.

Feachem served from July 2002 through March 2007. Dr. Michel Kazatchkine was then selected as executive director over the Global Fund's architect, David Nabarro, even though Nabarro was "considered the strongest of three shortlisted candidates to head the Global Fund ... A selection committee has evaluated the three nominees' qualifications and ranked 'Nabarro first, Kazatchkine second and (Alex) Cotinho third,' according to a Fund source."

In September 2011, the AIDS Healthcare Foundation called for Kazatchkine's resignation in the wake of isolated yet unprecedented reports of "waste, fraud, and corruption" in order that "reforms may begin in earnest". In January 2012, Kazatchkine ultimately declared his resignation, following the decision made by the Global Fund board in November 2011 to appoint a general manager, leaving Kazatchkine's role to that of chief fund-raiser and public advocate. Communications later disclosed by the United States government stated that Kazatchkine's performance was deemed unsatisfactory by the Global Fund board, notably in relation to the funding of activities related to the First Lady of France at the time, Carla Bruni-Sarkozy.

Following Kazatchkine's resignation, the Global Fund announced the appointment of Gabriel Jaramillo, the former chairman and chief executive officer of Sovereign Bank, to the newly created position of general manager. Jaramillo, who had retired one year earlier, had since served as a Special Advisor to the Office of the Special Envoy for Malaria of the Secretary General of the United Nations, and was a member of the high-level independent panel that looked at the Global Fund's fiduciary controls and oversight mechanisms. Jaramillo reorganized and reduced Global Fund staff in response to the previous year's critics of the Global Fund.

Dr. Mark R. Dybul was appointed executive director in November 2012. He previously served as the United States Global AIDS Coordinator, leading the implementation of the President's Emergency Plan for AIDS Relief (PEPFAR), and went on to be co-director of the Center for Global Health and Quality at Georgetown University Medical Center after he ended his appointment in 2017.

A nominating process to find a successor to Dybul ran into trouble in 2017 because nominees had spoken out against Donald Trump as a candidate for president of the United States. The Global Fund board named Global Fund Chief of Staff Marijke Wijnroks of the Netherlands as interim executive director while the nominating process restarted.

The Global Fund board selected banker Peter Sands as executive director in 2017. He assumed the role in 2018.

== Operations ==
The Global Fund was formed as an independent, non-profit foundation under Swiss law and hosted by the World Health Organization in January 2002. In January 2009, the organization became an administratively autonomous organization, terminating its administrative services agreement with the World Health Organization.

The initial objective of the Global Fund – to provide funding to countries on the basis of performance – was supposed to make it different from other international agencies at the time of its inception. Other organizations may have staff that assist with the implementation of grants. However, the Global Fund's five-year evaluation in 2009 concluded that without a standing body of technical staff, the Global Fund is not able to ascertain the actual results of its projects. It has therefore tended to look at disbursements or the purchase of inputs as performance. It also became apparent shortly after the organization opened that a pure funding mechanism could not work on its own, and it began relying on other agencies – notably the World Health Organization – to support countries in designing and drafting their applications and in supporting implementation. The United Nations Development Programme, in particular, bears responsibility for supporting Global Fund-financed projects in a number of countries. As a result, the organisation is most accurately described as a financial supplement to the existing global health architecture rather than as a separate approach.

The Global Fund Secretariat in Geneva, Switzerland, employs about 1300 staff. There are neither offices nor staff based in other countries.

In 2013, the Global Fund adopted a new way of distributing its funds in countries to fight AIDS, tuberculosis and malaria. Under this funding model, eligible countries receive an allocation of money every three years for possible use during the same three-year period. The total amount of all allocations across all countries depends on the amount contributed by governments and other donors through the "replenishment" fundraising during the same three-year period. The countries, through their Country Coordinating Mechanism (CCM)), submit applications outlining how they will use the allocation, including selecting the main implementers of grants in countries called Principal Recipients (PR) to carry about programs within their respective countries. An independent Technical Review Panel (TRP) reviews the applications and there will be an iterative process towards the finalisation of the applications. Once the applications are approved, the Global Fund provides funding to the principal recipients based on achievement toward agreed indicators and actual expenses. Performance and expenses are periodically reviewed by a "local fund agent", which in most countries is an international financial audit company.

== Governance ==
=== Board ===
The Global Fund board is the supreme governing body of the organisation and embodies the partnership approach to global health and incorporates leading stakeholders in an inclusive and effective way. The core functions of the Board include: strategy development; governance oversight; commitment of financial resources; assessment of organisational performance; risk management; and partnership engagement, resource mobilisation and advocacy.

The Board includes 20 voting members, with equal representation by implementers and donors. Non-governmental organisations; communities living with and/or affected by HIV, TB and malaria; the private sector; and private foundations are also represented as voting members. There are also eight non-voting members, including the board chair and vice-chair; representatives of partner organisations including the World Health Organization and World Bank; as well as the Additional Public Donors constituency.

The chair and vice-chair of the Board (together the "Board Leadership") lead the Board's strategic focus on its core functions. Their primary role is to manage the affairs of the Board, including ensuring that the Board is organised properly, functions effectively, and meets its obligations and responsibilities. Prior to the end of the term of the Board Leadership, an ad hoc Board Leadership Nominations Committee (BLNC) is formed, and in 2018, for the first time, the BLNC implemented a process which interviewed finalised candidates in person for the Board Leadership.

The current Board Leadership is made up of Lady Roslyn Morauta and Bience Gawanas, who assumed their tenures in May 2023.

=== Committees ===
The work of the Board operates through three committees where each constituency should be represented in at least one standing committee, which are the Audit and Finance Committee (AFC), Ethics and Governance Committee (EGC), and the Strategy Committee (SC).

== Corruption and misuse of funds ==
In January 2011, the Associated Press reported vast corruption in some programs financed by the Global Fund, citing findings of the Global Fund Office of the Inspector General – an auditing unit independent from the Global Fund Secretariat – that up to two-thirds of funds in some of the reviewed grants were lost to fraud. The Office of the Inspector General report showed that systematic fraud patterns had been used across countries. The Global Fund responded to the story with a news release, stating, "The Global Fund has zero tolerance for corruption and actively seeks to uncover any evidence of misuse of its funds. It deploys some of the most rigorous procedures to detect fraud and fight corruption of any organization financing development."

After the Associated Press story, a number of op-eds, including one by Michael Gerson published in The Washington Post in February 2011, sought to put the controversy surrounding the misuse of Global Fund grants in perspective. Gerson stated, "The two-thirds figure applies to one element of one country's grant – the single most extreme example in the world. Investigations are ongoing, but the $34 million in fraud that has been exposed represents about three-tenths of 1 percent of the money the fund has distributed. The targeting of these particular cases was not random; they were the most obviously problematic, not the most typical."

Global Fund spokesman Jon Liden told the Associated Press, "The messenger is being shot to some extent. We would contend that we do not have any corruption problems that are significantly different in scale or nature to any other international financing institution."

Previous reviews of grants and the Global Fund had shown substantial misconduct in some programs, lack of adequate risk management, and operational inefficiency of the Global Fund. Cases of corruption had also been found in several African countries such as Mali, Mauritania, Djibouti, and Zambia.

Sweden, the Global Fund's 11th-biggest contributor at the time (2011), suspended its US$85 million annual donation until the corruption problems were resolved. Germany, the third-biggest contributor at the time, also blocked any financing until a special investigation was complete. Funding was eventually restored.

In February 2011, Financial Times reported that the Global Fund board failed to act previously on concerns over accountability including on the conclusion of an external evaluation in 2009 that criticized the organization's weak procurement practices. Warnings of inadequate controls had also been reported periodically. Financial Times also reported that its own review found that neither Global Fund staff nor "local fund agents" (the entities entrusted with audit-like tasks at the country level) had noticed the deficiencies reported by the inspector general.

After pushing countries to reclaim stolen funds from the parties responsible and recovering only about half, the organization began in 2014 as a last resort reducing future grants by twice the amount of misappropriated funds. As of February 2016, this resulted in US$14.8 million of reductions (collectively) for Bangladesh, Guatemala, Nigeria and Sri Lanka. Current status is reported to the Global Fund Board at least annually. The Global Fund's Office of the Inspector General audited the recoveries process in 2020.

In 2020, the Global Fund rejected Kenya's application for US$114 million due to a lack of transparency in the selection of firms to manage the fund.

== Internal controversies ==
In 2012, the Global Fund faced internal controversy over the dismissal of John Parsons, then head of its Office of the Inspector General (OIG). Parsons had overseen investigations that uncovered cases of fraud, mismanagement, and diversion of grant funds, prompting several donor governments to temporarily withhold contributions. He alleged that senior officials attempted to interfere with his anti-corruption work and limit the independence of the OIG. In 2016, the International Labour Organization's Administrative Tribunal ruled that Parsons’ termination was unjustified and that the Global Fund had misrepresented it as a case of poor performance. The tribunal ordered the Fund to remove related public statements and awarded Parsons back pay, legal costs, and CHF 150,000 in moral damages. Documents obtained under the U.S. Freedom of Information Act indicated that Parsons had resisted pressure to certify to the U.S. State Department that the OIG operated without interference – a declaration required for continued U.S. funding. His refusal and subsequent dismissal were cited by transparency advocates as evidence of tensions between donor influence and institutional independence within the Fund's governance structure.

Around the same period, the resignation of Executive Director Michel Kazatchkine also drew attention to internal governance challenges. Commentators linked both incidents to broader structural issues in the Fund's donor-driven model, in which governments sitting on the board could exercise political influence over oversight mechanisms.

Shortly after Peter Sands assumed the role of executive director in 2018, the Global Fund announced a partnership with Heineken to support disease-control efforts in Africa. The collaboration was criticized by public-health organizations, including The Lancet and the NCD Alliance, as a conflict of interest that undermined the Fund's health objectives, given alcohol's role as a major risk factor for HIV and tuberculosis.

Governance and transparency concerns also extended to staff workload, well-being and mental health, with watchdog group Aidspan reporting increased complaints related to work-related stress, management practices, and issues with internal justice mechanisms.
