= Integrity Council for the Voluntary Carbon Market =

Voluntary carbon market integrity initiative

- Abbreviation: ICVCM
- Type: Independent governance body for the voluntary carbon market
- Purpose: Publishes and operationalises the Core Carbon Principles (CCPs), including assessing carbon crediting programs against the CCP assessment framework and issuing implementation guidance for CCP-related tagging and labelling.
- Region served: Global
- Main organ: Governing Board
- Website: icvcm.org

The Integrity Council for the Voluntary Carbon Market (ICVCM) is an independent governance body that publishes the Core Carbon Principles (CCPs) and related guidance intended to define high-level integrity criteria for carbon credits used in the voluntary carbon market.

The CCPs are presented as a threshold benchmark for "high-integrity" credits and for claims made about the use of such credits. ICVCM publishes an assessment framework, definitions, and an assessment procedure, and it assesses carbon crediting programs against those requirements to determine whether a program is "CCP-Eligible".

ICVCM's framework separates program and credit category decisions. Carbon crediting programs may be assessed as CCP-Eligible, and CCP-Eligible programs may apply a registry-based "CCP-Approved" label to credits from approved categories, using ICVCM implementation guidance for tagging and labelling. The tagging framework also includes optional attribute tags, including tags intended to signal host-country authorisation for international mitigation purposes under Article 6 of the Paris Agreement (see Cooperative mechanisms under Article 6 of the Paris Agreement).

ICVCM was established in 2021 following recommendations of the Taskforce on Scaling Voluntary Carbon Markets (TSVCM). It published the CCP document set in January 2024 and later issued operational guidance for CCP tagging and labelling in registries. In 2024, ICVCM said that several renewable energy crediting methodologies would not be eligible for the CCP label, citing additionality concerns.

ICVCM has been discussed in reporting on voluntary market reform and quality labelling initiatives, including debate about how benchmarks may affect crediting programs and corporate use of offsets. Reuters has also covered ICVCM benchmark tests and later decisions on approval of specific credit types under the CCP framework, including an August 2024 test in which around a third of credits did not meet the benchmark threshold, and later approvals of certain deforestation and clean cookstove credit types under the benchmark.

== Background ==
The voluntary carbon market involves carbon credits that are issued and traded outside mandatory (compliance) emissions trading schemes, and that are often used by organisations to support voluntary climate-related claims. Analyses of voluntary markets have argued that credit "quality" can be difficult for buyers and other stakeholders to judge because claimed mitigation impacts depend on counterfactual baselines (see FREL), monitoring methods, and how risks such as leakage, non-permanence, and double counting are addressed (see also REDD+).

Market commentary and academic analysis have described recurring integrity concerns, including information asymmetries between project developers and credit buyers, heterogeneous methodologies across standards, and perverse incentives that can reward over-crediting when demand is driven by headline "tons" of carbon dioxide equivalent rather than robust impact.

Policy and multilateral discussions in the early 2020s increasingly framed "integrity" as a prerequisite for scaling voluntary and related markets, including through guidance intended to improve transparency, consistency, and confidence in market participation and claims. In this context, governments and international institutions published frameworks that emphasised clearer rules and due diligence for market actors, and explored how voluntary activity could interact with wider carbon-market architecture and climate policy goals.

Against that backdrop, a range of initiatives emerged that sought to establish common principles, quality labels, or benchmark tests for carbon credits and the programs that issue them.

In voluntary markets, credits are typically issued and tracked under carbon crediting programs that set detailed rules and processes for quantification, validation and verification, and unit management, while separate benchmark or governance initiatives focus on evaluating those programs and signalling credit attributes against independent criteria. ICVCM describes its role as assessing carbon crediting programs against the CCPs and publishing supporting materials for program eligibility and assessment, rather than operating as a carbon crediting program or issuing credits itself.

== History ==
In January 2021, the Taskforce on Scaling Voluntary Carbon Markets (TSVCM), a private-sector initiative, published a blueprint for scaling voluntary carbon markets and said it planned to launch a governance body intended to set "core carbon standards". ICVCM has said it was set up in September 2021 in response to the final recommendations of TSVCM.

In January 2024, ICVCM published the CCPs as a multi-part document set covering an introduction, the principles, a summary for decision makers, an assessment framework, definitions, and an assessment procedure. In May 2024, it published operational guidance for implementing CCP-related tagging and labelling in registries.

== Core Carbon Principles ==
The Core Carbon Principles (CCPs) are presented as a threshold benchmark for carbon credit quality in the voluntary carbon market. ICVCM presents ten principles:

- CCP-1 Effective governance
- CCP-2 Tracking
- CCP-3 Transparency
- CCP-4 Robust independent third-party validation and verification
- CCP-5 Additionality (Note: A concept used in carbon markets for whether credited emission reductions or removals would have happened without the credited activity.)
- CCP-6 Permanence
- CCP-7 Robust quantification of emission reductions and removals (see Greenhouse gas emissions accounting)
- CCP-8 No double counting
- CCP-9 Sustainable development benefits and safeguards
- CCP-10 Contribution toward net zero transition

ICVCM groups the principles under themes covering governance, emissions impact, and sustainable development, and applies them through assessment criteria and procedures used to evaluate carbon crediting programs and categories of credits.

The CCP materials are published as a multi-part set comprising an introduction, the principles, a summary for decision makers, an assessment framework, a definitions section, and an assessment procedure.

== Assessment of carbon crediting programs ==
ICVCM assesses carbon crediting programs to determine whether a program can be approved as CCP-Eligible. The program assessment considers governance and transparency arrangements, and the ability to track and manage units, alongside independent third-party validation and verification. It also evaluates whether program requirements and quantification methodologies support robust quantification of greenhouse gas emission reductions or removals, address integrity risks such as double counting, and include provisions relating to safeguards and sustainable development.

ICVCM's published process includes submission of supporting documentation, an assessment and draft report prepared by the secretariat, an opportunity for program feedback, and a decision on CCP eligibility by the Governing Board. Decisions are published, and ICVCM treats CCP eligibility as an ongoing status that may be reviewed over time.

=== Examples of program assessments ===
ICVCM's assessment status information lists major programs including Gold Standard and Verra's Verified Carbon Standard (VCS) as CCP-Eligible programs.

In a 2025 "Summary of Program Changes" under its assessment framework, ICVCM listed updates and planned changes reported across multiple programs. For Gold Standard, the summary described registry updates including recording the entity on whose behalf credits are retired and the purpose of retirement. It also listed planned changes including formalising anti-money laundering procedures into a single cohesive document.

For the Verified Carbon Standard, the same summary described publication of VCS Standard v4.7, including updates described as intended to clarify alignment with ICVCM requirements and to address conditions linked to VCS participation in the Carbon Offsetting and Reduction Scheme for International Aviation (CORSIA). It listed updates including an explicit prohibition of "double selling", updates to safeguards requirements, updates intended to prevent double issuance, and updates to Verra grievance redress policy and validator and verifier requirements, while also describing further planned program updates.

In addition to program eligibility, ICVCM makes category decisions about whether specific crediting methodologies or activity types can be CCP labelled. In August 2024, it said that several renewable energy crediting methodologies would not be eligible for the CCP label, describing the decision as linked to additionality and baseline related concerns, and noting that the methodologies were used by programs including Gold Standard and the Verified Carbon Standard.

== CCP labelling and tagging ==
ICVCM's CCP system separates program and category decisions: a carbon crediting program can be approved as CCP-Eligible, and categories of credits under that program can be approved so that credits issued under them qualify to be tagged and labelled as CCP-Approved.

CCP labelling is implemented through registry-based tagging applied by CCP-Eligible programs. ICVCM's tagging manual sets out operational requirements for applying CCP-related tags and labels in program registries.

In addition to the CCP-Approved tag, the framework provides optional "CCP Attributes" that can be recorded as separate tags on CCP-Approved credits to signal characteristics relevant to credit use and claims, such as host-country authorisation for other international mitigation purposes under Article 6 of the Paris Agreement (see Cooperative mechanisms under Article 6 of the Paris Agreement), application of a share of proceeds for adaptation, or quantified sustainable development impacts.

== Governance and operations ==
According to its governance materials, ICVCM is overseen by a Governing Board and supported by a secretariat, committees, and an Expert Panel providing technical input. ICVCM lists committees including a Standards Oversight Committee, a Market and Communications Committee, an Indigenous Peoples and Local Communities Committee, and a Governance Committee.

ICVCM publishes organisational policies including a code of conduct and a conflict-of-interest policy.

== Related policy and market context ==
ICVCM's CCP benchmark sits alongside public-sector and multilateral efforts to clarify how carbon markets should function, and how "integrity" should be assessed in practice. International guidance aimed at governments and market participants has discussed participation in international and voluntary carbon markets, including governance and accounting and authorisation questions relevant to cooperative approaches under the Paris Agreement (see Cooperative mechanisms under Article 6 of the Paris Agreement).

National policy work has also discussed how domestic carbon credit markets might be developed and overseen, and how voluntary markets could interact with emerging policy frameworks for greenhouse gas removals.

In regional policy discussions, the Asia Carbon Markets Forum (ACMF) published a study on a high-quality voluntary carbon market for ASEAN that discussed voluntary carbon markets as part of the region's wider sustainable-finance architecture and surveyed emerging integrity frameworks including ICVCM's CCPs.

== Reception and criticism ==
=== Reception ===
Coverage of ICVCM has described it as part of broader efforts to respond to integrity concerns in voluntary carbon markets by developing clearer benchmarks and quality signals for carbon credits, and as an attempt to raise expectations for crediting programs and claims about voluntary credit use.

Reuters has covered ICVCM-related debates and outcomes, including early benchmark testing results that found a portion of credits did not meet a benchmark threshold, and later approvals of specific credit types under the CCP benchmark.

=== Criticism ===
Critiques of voluntary carbon market integrity initiatives have argued that principle-based benchmarks may be difficult to translate into consistent outcomes and that persistent market failures can limit the ability of buyers to distinguish higher-integrity credits from lower-integrity ones.

==== Stringency and additionality ====
In a 2022 public comment submission on draft CCP materials, Barbara Haya argued that high-level integrity concepts such as additionality, conservative quantification, and permanence were already used by existing programs, yet over-crediting had still occurred in practice. She argued that a principles-based benchmark would need rigorous, credit-type-specific assessment and resourcing to reliably screen out over-crediting, and she raised concerns about baseline setting and other methodological choices that could systematically inflate credited reductions.

ICVCM's published materials frame the CCPs as a threshold benchmark intended to be operationalised through an assessment framework and procedure, rather than as standalone principles. ICVCM has also published consultation feedback materials describing how public input informed revisions to CCP-related documents.

==== Governance and independence ====
Academic analysis of the voluntary carbon market has characterised persistent market failure problems, including imperfect information about credit quality and conflicts of interest in certification chains, as barriers to effective discipline of crediting programs and validators and verifiers. In this framing, competitive pressures and fee-for-service incentives may favour faster approvals and higher issuance over conservative crediting in fragmented markets with heterogeneous standards.

Counterarguments emphasise that independent benchmarks can still improve market function by making program requirements more comparable and by raising transparency expectations. ICVCM governance materials state that it has a Governing Board and published policies addressing conflicts of interest and conduct.

==== Implementation and verification ====
Commentary has also highlighted the difficulty of translating benchmark principles into consistent registry practice and project-level outcomes, including challenges in monitoring, verification, and detecting over-crediting or methodological weaknesses.

In a December 2024 complaint submission, Carbon Market Watch argued that aspects of grievance handling linked to a REDD+ project did not meet CCP-related expectations for an impartial grievance process and urged ICVCM to test whether grievance procedures work effectively in practice rather than relying only on written policies.

ICVCM's published materials frame implementation as involving operational guidance and ongoing oversight. ICVCM publishes registry tagging guidance and an assurance manual describing oversight arrangements for CCP-Eligible programs, and it publishes assessment status information as part of its process transparency.

==== Equity and benefit-sharing ====
Civil-society organisations have published critiques focusing on distributional and rights-related issues in voluntary carbon markets, including benefit-sharing transparency, impacts on local communities, and risks to Indigenous peoples' rights in some project contexts.

Supporters of integrity frameworks argue that stronger safeguards (including approaches commonly referred to as the Cancún safeguards) and clearer rules can improve accountability for social and environmental impacts. The CCPs include a principle on sustainable development benefits and safeguards, and ICVCM governance materials describe an Indigenous Peoples and Local Communities Committee as part of its committee structure.
