= Peter Sands (banker) =

British banker

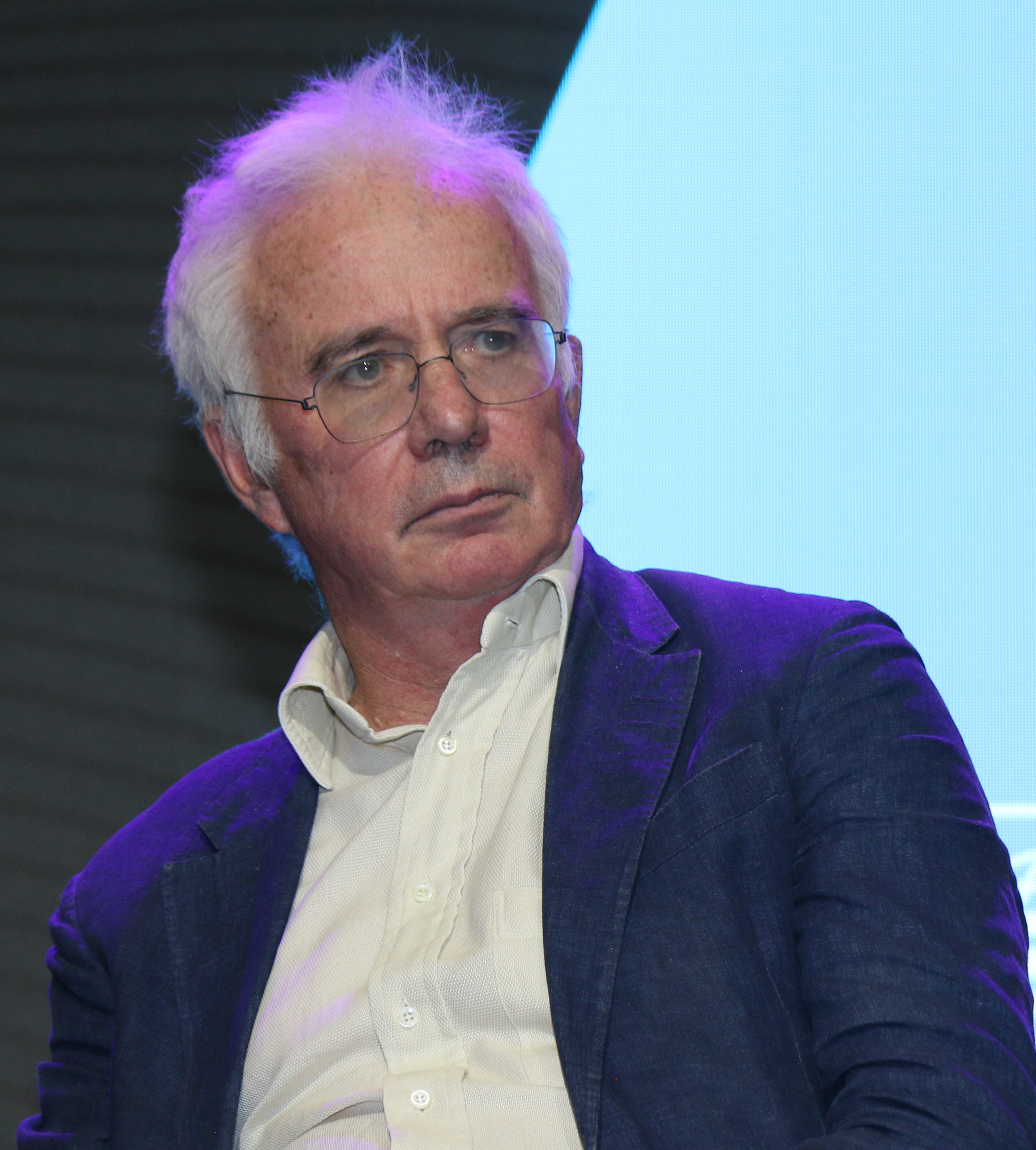
- Sands in 2015
- Born: 8 January 1962 (age 64)
- Education: Brasenose College, Oxford (BA); Harvard University (MPA)
- Occupation: Banker
- Years active: 2002–
- Title: Executive Director, Global Fund
- Term: March 2018–
- Board member of: Standard Chartered Bank PLC; Institute of International Finance; Department of Health(UK); Global Business Coalition on HIV/AIDS, Tuberculosis and Malaria
- Spouse: Betsy Tobin
- Children: 4

Peter Alexander Sands (born 8 January 1962) is a British banker, and the executive director of the Global Fund to fight AIDS, Tuberculosis and Malaria. He was the chief executive (CEO) of Standard Chartered from November 2006 to June 2015.

== Early life and education ==
Peter Sands was born in the UK on 8 January 1962 to British parents who had themselves been born in Asia. His father, was born in Malaya, a British colony until 1957, where his grandfather ran rubber plantations for the London Asiatic Rubber and Produce Co and his mother was born in India, another former British colonial outpost.

Sands was taken to Malaysia as a baby and spent much of his life outside Britain, mostly in Malaysia and Singapore. He was educated at Crown Woods Comprehensive School in London, and the United World College of the Pacific in British Columbia, Canada, before he went to Oxford.

Sands graduated with a BA degree from Brasenose College at Oxford in 1984. He started as a trainee at UK's Foreign and Commonwealth Office, which he left to take a Harkness Fellowship at Harvard University to earn a master's degree in public administration from Kennedy School of Government.

== Career ==
=== McKinsey, 1988–2002 ===
In 1988, Sands started his career as a consultant for the management consulting firm, McKinsey in its London office. He held positions of increasing responsibilities in the firm, and in 1996 he became a partner, and later in 2000 rose to position of a director.

=== Standard Chartered, 2002–2015 ===
In 2002, Standard Chartered PLC, a client of McKinsey, hired Sands as its Group Finance Director. Four years later in 2006, he was chosen as its Group Chief Executive Officer.

Between 2002 and 2008, the headcount of Standard Chartered nearly doubled to 70,000. The British bank rescue plan, which was copied around the world, was based on a blueprint devised by Sands. Standard Chartered itself did not take "any taxpayer money or used any central bank liquidity schemes".

Also during his time at the bank, Sands was harshly criticized after Standard Chartered paid New York State $340 million in 2012 to settle claims it laundered money for Iran.

In February 2015, amidst growing shareholder calls for his resignation, Sands announced that he would be stepping down as CEO, effective June 2015. At the time of the announcement, the Wall Street Journal noted that Sands, having served at the helm of Standard Chartered for nine years, was among the "longest-serving chiefs of a major Western bank." On 26 February 2015, it was announced that his successor would be Bill Winters, former co-CEO of JP Morgan's investment banking business.

After leaving Standard Chartered, Sands was a senior fellow at the Mossavar-Rahmani Center for Business and Government at Harvard Kennedy School and became the lead non-executive board member of the Department of Health in the United Kingdom. In 2016, he also chaired the International Commission on a Global Health Risk Framework for the Future under the auspices of the National Academy of Medicine.

=== Global Fund to Fight AIDS, Tuberculosis and Malaria, 2017-current ===
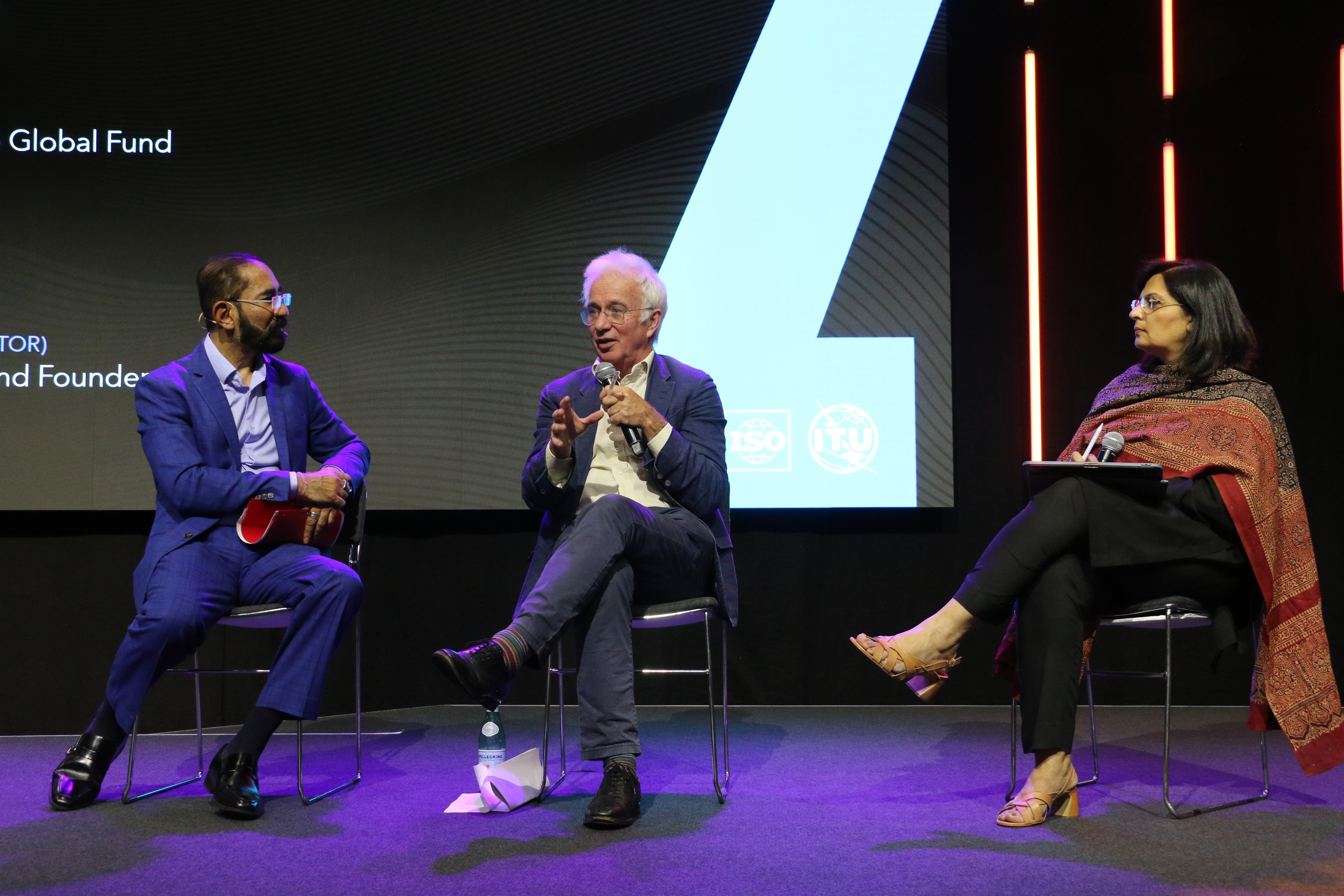
Sands at the 2025 AI for Good Summit in Geneva

In 2017, Sands was one of the candidates to succeed Mark Dybul as executive director of the Global Fund to Fight AIDS, Tuberculosis and Malaria (Global Fund). He withdrew his candidacy for personal reasons just three days before the selection committee meeting; shortly after, he asked the committee to reinstate his candidacy.

In November 2017, Sands was appointed to lead the Global Fund and started in the role in early 2018. As executive director, Sands oversaw record replenishments – US$14.02 billion in 2019 and US$15.7 billion in 2022 – and expanded market-shaping efforts that lowered prices for key TB and HIV medicines. His tenure also drew criticism over a 2018 partnership with Heineken and mishandling of staff grievances, notably those implicating his C-suite such as the Chief Risk Officer.

In his role at the GFATM, Sands was also appointed to the Pandemic Preparedness Partnership (PPP), an expert group chaired by Patrick Vallance to advise the G7 presidency held by the government of Prime Minister Boris Johnson in 2021.

== Other activities ==
Sands has served on various boards and commissions, including as:

- International Gender Champions (IGC), Member
- National Institute of Economic and Social Research, Governor
- Institute of International Finance (IIF), member of the board of directors and chairman of the Special Committee on Effective Regulation
- International Monetary Conference (IMC), Chairman
- Monetary Authority of Singapore (MAS), Member of the International Advisory Board
- UK-India CEO Forum, Chair (since 2010)

The British government appointed Sands in 2009 to the Independent Review of Higher Education Funding and Student Finance and he served as a board member of the Global Business Coalition on HIV/AIDS, Tuberculosis and Malaria (GBC)

Sands was a member of the British Good Work Commission, which is tasked to examine the major challenges of work in the 21st century and redefine the notion of good work – work that is rewarding for business, society and individuals.

== Personal life ==
Sands is married to the writer Betsy Tobin, and they have four children. They live in Highbury in north London, and have a second home in Monmouthshire.
