= ITMO =

ITMO may refer to:

- ITMO University, a university in Saint Petersburg, Russia
- Internationally transferred mitigation outcomes, units from the mechanism for international emissions trading between parties to the Paris Agreement
