= Development safeguard =

Protective measure in international law

In international law, a development safeguard or simply safeguard is a restraint on economic development to protect communities from development aggression.

In the United Nations Framework Convention on Climate Change (UNFCCC), safeguards are intended to protect indigenous peoples and other local communities with traditional knowledge of natural resource management within efforts towards reducing emissions from deforestation and forest degradation.

With UNFCC processes, safeguards became of concern in the 2010 United Nations Climate Change Conference. For REDD+ activities under the UNFCCC, the seven Cancún safeguards were adopted at the conference, and later decisions provided guidance on safeguards information systems for reporting how safeguards are addressed and respected.
