= Additionality =

Additionality is the property of an activity being additional by adding something new to the context. It is a determination of whether an intervention has an effect when compared to a baseline. Interventions can take a variety of forms but often include economic incentives.

Additionality may be evaluated ex post, as is often done in the practice of program evaluation, or ex ante, as an initial eligibility screen for issuing credits as part of an environmental or other public goods market.

For ex ante applications, additionality is evaluated for proposed activities. A proposed activity is additional if the recognized interventions are deemed to be causing the activity to take place, or whether a proposed activity is distinct from its baseline. A baseline is a prediction of the quantified amount of an input to or output from an activity resulting from the expected future behavior of the actors proposing, and affected by, the proposed activity in the absence of one or more policy interventions, holding all other factors constant (ceteris paribus).

Other working definitions of the term are available here.

For an example of the application of additionality in environmental crediting markets refer to carbon credits or carbon offsets.

== Economic definition ==
Net positive difference that results from economic development intervention. The extent to which an activity (and associated outputs, outcomes and impacts) is larger in scale, at a higher quality, takes place more quickly, takes place at a different location, or takes place at all as a result of intervention. Additionality measures the net result, taking account of deadweight, leakage, displacement, substitution and economic multipliers.

Additionality is calculated by the following formula:

A = I_{in} − I_{rc}

where A is the additionality, I_{in} is the impact of the intervention, and I_{rc} is the impact of a reference case.

== Problems ==
Additionality becomes problematic when the parties claim that their behavior is being changed due to recognized intervention (e.g., because of the economic incentive provided by earning carbon offset credits), when in fact the intervention is having no effect on their behavior because other factors are dominant (e.g., earning a profit from an activity even without carbon credits). The proposed project is therefore not truly additional, since it would have been implemented without the intervention (e.g., in the form of the carbon credit price signal). This without intervention scenario is often referred to as "business as usual").

Additionality is used as a screening concept in voluntary carbon markets; for example, the Integrity Council for the Voluntary Carbon Market cited additionality concerns when stating that several renewable energy crediting methodologies would not be eligible for its Core Carbon Principles label.

== See also ==
- Clean Development Mechanism – additional climate mitigation measures as defined under the Kyoto Protocol
- Carbon credit
- Carbon offset
- Value added
