= Administrative Tribunal of the International Labour Organization =

International Labour Court overview
- Formed: 1927
- Preceding International Labour Court: Administrative Tribunal of the League of Nations (former name)

The Administrative Tribunal of the International Labour Organization, shortened ILO Administrative Tribunal or ILOAT, is a tribunal for conflicts of employees and their employer in intergovernmental organisations. The tribunal was established as the "Administrative Tribunal of the League of Nations" in 1927 by the League of Nations and transferred (and renamed) to the International Labour Organization in 1946. Labour-related decisions of 60 international organisations can be appealed to at ILOAT.

== Judges ==
As of October 2025, the tribunal was composed as follows:

- Michael Francis Moore (Australia), president
- Patrick Frydman (France), vice-president
- Sir Hugh Anthony Rawlins (Saint Kitts and Nevis)
- Jacques Jaumotte (Belgium)
- Clement Gascon (Canada)
- Rosanna De Nictolis (Italy)
- Hongyu Shen (China)

== Judgments ==
As of 12 October 2025, ILO has issued over 5100 judgements. The organisations in relation to which most decisions were issued are:

Abbreviation	Name	Number of decisions
EPO	European Patent Organisation	1117
WHO	World Health Organization	581
FAO	Food and Agriculture Organization of the United Nations	412
ILO	International Labour Organization	404
Eurocontrol	European Organisation for the Safety of Air Navigation	323
UNESCO	United Nations Educational, Scientific and Cultural Organization	309
ITU	International Telecommunication Union	201
IAEA	International Atomic Energy Agency	178
WIPO	World Intellectual Property Organization	177
UNIDO	United Nations Industrial Development Organization	128
CERN	European Organization for Nuclear Research	126
PAHO	Pan American Health Organization	117
ESO	European Southern Observatory	110
ICC	International Criminal Court	78
UPU	Universal Postal Union	77
INTERPOL	International Criminal Police Organization	74
OPCW	Organisation for the Prohibition of Chemical Weapons	74
IOM	International Organization for Migration	70
Global Fund	The Global Fund to Fight AIDS, Tuberculosis and Malaria	48
EMBL	European Molecular Biology Laboratory	43
