= Bill Winters =

American banker (born 1961)

Bill Winters CBE
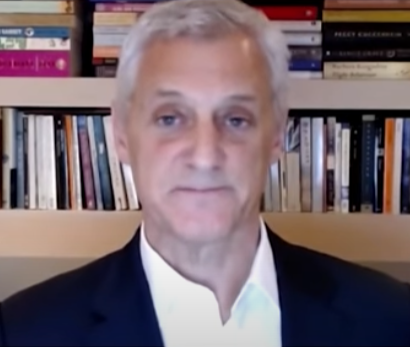
- Winters in 2021
- Born: William Thomas Winters; September 1961 (age 64–65); Connecticut, US
- Education: Colgate University; Wharton School at University of Pennsylvania
- Occupation: Banker
- Title: Group Chief Executive, Standard Chartered
- Term: June 2015-
- Predecessor: Peter Sands
- Spouse: Anda Winters
- Children: 2

William Thomas Winters, CBE (born September 1961) is an American banker who is the group chief executive of Standard Chartered and former co-head of JPMorgan Chase's investment bank.

== Early life ==
William Thomas Winters was born in September 1961, in Connecticut. He attended Greenwich High School, earned a bachelor's degree in international relations from Colgate University, followed by an MBA from the Wharton School at the University of Pennsylvania. He has dual American and British nationality.

== Career ==
=== JP Morgan ===
Winters joined the JP Morgan graduate trainee scheme because he couldn't afford to pursue his interest in international diplomacy.

He was key in JP Morgan's development of credit derivatives markets.

He was appointed co-head of JP Morgan's investment bank along with Steve Black in 2004; Winters was based in London while Black's office was in New York City. Winters earned much credit for helping the investment bank avoid "structured products and off-balance sheet vehicles that crippled global markets because they didn't make financial sense", as well as his leadership in the acquisition of ailing rival investment bank Bear Stearns in March 2008. Winters was also "instrumental" in JPMorgan's joint venture with and later purchase of Cazenove.

However, Winters was ousted from his position in 2009 amid reports that he wanted to succeed the CEO Jamie Dimon. Black was replaced by Jes Staley who was named the new CEO of the investment bank, although Black stayed on as chairman of that unit until his retirement in 2011.

=== Renshaw Bay ===
In February 2011, Winters founded the hedge fund Renshaw Bay. He put up half the money, with investors Jacob Rothschild and Johann Rupert putting up the balance.

=== Standard Chartered ===
In February 2015, it was announced that Winters would replace Peter Sands as group chief executive of Standard Chartered in June 2015. In the years following his appointment at Standard Chartered, the share price fell – as did that of peer HSBC – although in 2025 it hit a ten-year high. Standard Chartered's executive pensions attracted some investor criticism in 2019, and some 36% of votes cast at StanChart's annual shareholder meeting in London were against its 2019 directors' remuneration report.

In September 2022, Winters said Hong Kong is "open" and would attend the November 2022 Global Financial Leaders' Investment Summit in the city, despite quarantine measures for inbound travelers. Winters is scheduled to speak at the Summit, with the Hong Kong Democracy Council claiming that his presence, along with other financial executives, legitimizes the Hong Kong government's whitewashing of the erosion of freedoms in the city. Several members of Congress also warned that US financial executives should not attend the Summit, saying "Their presence only serves to legitimise the swift dismantling of Hong Kong's autonomy, free press and the rule of law by Hong Kong authorities acting along with the Chinese Communist Party."

Winters had earlier said in September 2022 that Hong Kong is "open". However, in a November 2022 interview, Winters, after the Summit, said of the current restrictions "I think you should scrap the whole thing. No tests on arrival, no tests on departure, and then just ask people to be responsible." He also said that testing is an issue because business travelers risk getting stuck in Hong Kong for around a week if they test positive.

== Tenure at Standard Chartered ==
Winters joined Standard Chartered in May 2015, succeeding Peter Sands as Group Chief Executive in June of that year. His tenure has been marked by a sustained restructuring programme involving cost reductions, divestiture of underperforming assets, and a pivot toward digital and affluent banking services.

=== Executive pay controversy (2019) ===
In 2019, Standard Chartered faced significant shareholder opposition over proposed pension arrangements for its senior executives. The bank planned to award Winters a pension allowance of £474,000 — the highest of any chief executive of a large UK-listed bank at the time — on top of a fixed salary in cash and shares of £2.4 million. Investor advisory firms ISS and Glass Lewis recommended shareholders vote against the proposals, arguing the bank had changed its methodology for calculating pension contributions — dividing by total salary rather than base salary alone — in what one shareholder described to the Financial Times as "smoke and mirrors".

Some 36 per cent of votes cast at the bank's annual general meeting in London were against its directors' remuneration report, the largest protest vote at a UK bank for five years. The UK Parliament's Work and Pensions Committee subsequently wrote to the chair of Standard Chartered's remuneration committee to question the policy.

Winters responded to the dissenting shareholders by calling their position "immature and unhelpful" in an interview with the Financial Times. Following the public backlash, Standard Chartered subsequently halved his pension allowance from 20 per cent to 10 per cent of salary, effective January 2020, aligning it with the rate applied to UK employees.

=== Compensation ===
In 2024, Winters received a total pay package of £10.7 million ($13.6 million), a 46 per cent increase on the prior year and the highest of his tenure, coinciding with the bank's announcement of a major cost-cutting programme and a reported 21 per cent increase in earnings. The bank proposed a maximum package of £13.1 million for 2025.

== "Lower-value human capital" controversy ==
On 19 May 2026, Standard Chartered announced at an investor forum in Hong Kong that it planned to eliminate more than 15 per cent of its support staff by 2030, a reduction of approximately 7,800 roles, as part of a push to deploy artificial intelligence across its operations. The bank employed around 52,000 people in such roles across India, China, Poland, Singapore, and Hong Kong, as well as approximately 81,000 total employees and a further 17,000 contract workers at the end of 2025. Roles identified as being at risk included positions in human resources, risk, and compliance.

Speaking to journalists ahead of the investor presentation, Winters characterised the workforce reduction not as cost-cutting but as capital reallocation, stating: "It's not cost cutting. It's replacing in some cases lower-value human capital with the financial capital and the investment capital we're putting in."

The following day, Winters issued a memorandum to staff, seen by Bloomberg News, in which he sought to contain the fallout. "Many of you will have seen media coverage following the Investor Event in Hong Kong, particularly the reporting around automation, AI, and workforce changes," he wrote. "I know this may be unsettling when reduced to simple headlines or a quote out of context." The memo did not reproduce or clarify the original phrasing. Winters added that "where roles do fall away, it reflects changes in the work, not the value of our people" — a formulation that had not featured in his remarks to investors the previous day.

Jamie Dimon, chief executive of JPMorgan Chase and Winters' former employer, defended him in a Bloomberg Television interview, describing the original remarks as "an inartful way to say something" and noting that "all of us say something incorrectly". Dimon did not address the substance of the remark. A Standard Chartered spokesperson maintained that Winters' comments had been taken out of context, framing them as a description of a shift from lower-value to higher-value work, rather than a characterisation of the employees themselves.

=== Reaction ===
The remarks drew immediate and widespread condemnation across Asia — the region that generates the majority of Standard Chartered's profits — as well as on social media internationally. Halimah Yacob, President of Singapore from 2017 to 2023 and a former deputy secretary general of the National Trades Union Congress, published a response on Facebook on the same day, writing that it was "disturbing" to read workers described in such terms. "Workers are human beings with families, not just a form of capital," she wrote. "They too have contributed to the bank and now because of AI have become redundant. It's demeaning to describe them as 'lower-value human capital'."

Regulators in both markets moved swiftly. The Monetary Authority of Singapore raised the matter in discussions with the bank, and the Hong Kong Monetary Authority formally requested that Standard Chartered explain Winters' comments. Some regulators additionally pressed the bank on the specific impact of the planned reductions in their respective markets. On social media, commentary compared the remarks to Marie Antoinette's apocryphal phrase "Let them eat cake".

== Other activities ==
Winters was one of the commissioners of the UK Independent Commission on Banking after the 2008 financial crisis.

Winters participated in a charity video entitled "Life's a Pitch" alongside other senior financial managers, which was shown at the Young Vic theatre in London in 2013 and raised £250,000.

In 2020 Winters co-founded, with Mark Carney, the Task Force on Scaling Voluntary Carbon Markets, an initiative to increase trading of voluntary carbon offsets.

== Recognition ==
Winters received a CBE in the 2013 Birthday Honours for services to the Economy and UK Financial Services Industry.

== Personal life ==
Winters wife, Anda, is CEO and creative director of the Coronet Theatre, London. They have two children.
