= CO2balance =

British profit-for-purpose carbon management consultancy and project developer

- Company type: Private
- Industry: Environmental services
- Founded: 2003
- Founder: Mark Simpson
- Headquarters: Taunton, UK
- Number of locations: 3 (United Kingdom, Kenya, Uganda)
- Area served: Worldwide (consultancy) Sub-Saharan Africa (projects) South Asia (projects)
- Products: Carbon credits, SDG Impact Outcomes
- Services: Project Development Carbon Management Carbon Offsetting Carbon Footprinting Life Cycle Analysis ESOS assessments CSR programmes

CO2balance UK Ltd is a British profit-for-purpose carbon management consultancy and project developer founded in 2003. It is known for developing carbon finance projects in developing countries that reduce carbon emissions and support the Sustainable Development Goals. CO2balance also provides businesses and individuals with carbon footprint calculation and reduction services, bestowing the label of ‘CarbonZero’ on those organisations that completely offset the footprint of their operations.

CO2balance has two local subsidiaries in Kenya and Uganda, under the titles of CarbonZero Kenya Ltd and CO2balance Uganda Ltd.

== History ==
CO2balance was founded in 2003 by former research chemist Mark Simpson and associated colleagues. Their goal was to create an organisation that worked to mitigate climate change, using the then-novel method of carbon finance.

CO2balance started out by developing locally based carbon finance initiatives in the UK, such as forestry projects in Bishops Wood and Somercombe Wood in Devon, and Sand Martin Wood in Cumbria.

As the carbon market developed, the company started to explore the possibility of implementing carbon projects in Africa, as a means to channel revenue from carbon finance into the sustainable development of some of the world's poorest communities. In 2007, CO2balance began investing in solar power and improved cookstove projects in East Africa. Soon thereafter the company established two local offices in Kenya and Uganda.

In 2008, the company collaborated with 7 other carbon management organisations to found the International Carbon Reduction and Offset Alliance (ICROA), a non-profit organisation that promotes best practice across the voluntary carbon market.

By 2012, CO2balance had started to implement energy-efficiency projects under the Gold Standard, VCS and CDM carbon standards, with a particular focus on fuel efficient cookstoves and safe water technology. In 2013 CO2balance registered the first multi-country programme of activities (PoA) for micro-scale projects under the Gold Standard. Since then CO2balance has expanded its scope of activities from East Africa into Southern Africa, West Africa and Southern Asia. In 2017, CO2balance began developing projects for the Gold Standard's new Gold Standard for the Global Goals (GS4GG), and became the first organisation to pilot SDG 5 (Gender Equality) for the standard.

In November 2018, representatives of CO2balance presented the 2018 .eu Web Award for a Better World to the Stardust Smart Cities project in Brussels.

== Operations ==
CO2balance operates as both a primary project developer and a consultant for a range of carbon management services for both private and public sector organisations.

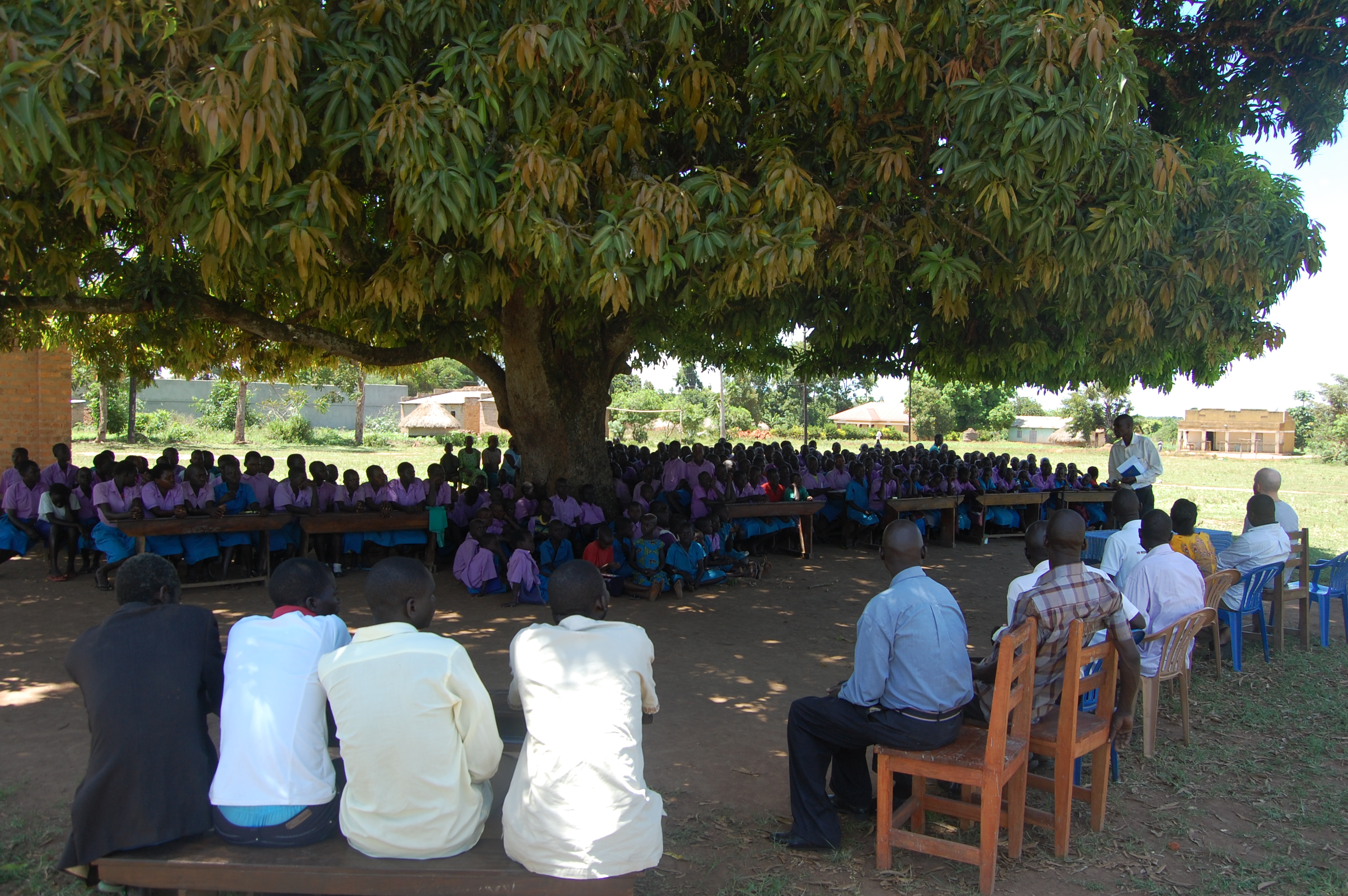
CO2balance hosting a community meeting in Uganda.

=== Project development ===
CO2balance designs and delivers climate protection projects in sub-Saharan Africa, generating marketable carbon credits from the resultant emissions reductions. However, the company is also dedicated to advancing the Sustainable Development Goals (SDGs), so ensures that as well as reducing CO_{2} emissions, the projects also deliver real and demonstrable benefits to target communities. CO2balance adheres to a profit for purpose approach, whereby revenue from the sale of carbon credits is used to maintain projects over the long term and reinvested into new project development. The company typically works in partnership with in-country NGOs to implement their projects.

The impacts of projects are verified primarily under the Gold Standard for the Global Goals (GS4GG), as well as the Clean Development Mechanism (CDM) and Verified Carbon Standard. GS4GG requires projects to demonstrate a clear and direct contribution to at least 3 SDGs, such as gender equality, health, and water/sanitation, to accelerate global progress towards climate security and sustainable development. In 2017, CO2balance became the first organisation to pilot the GS4GG methodology for SDG 5 (Gender Equality).

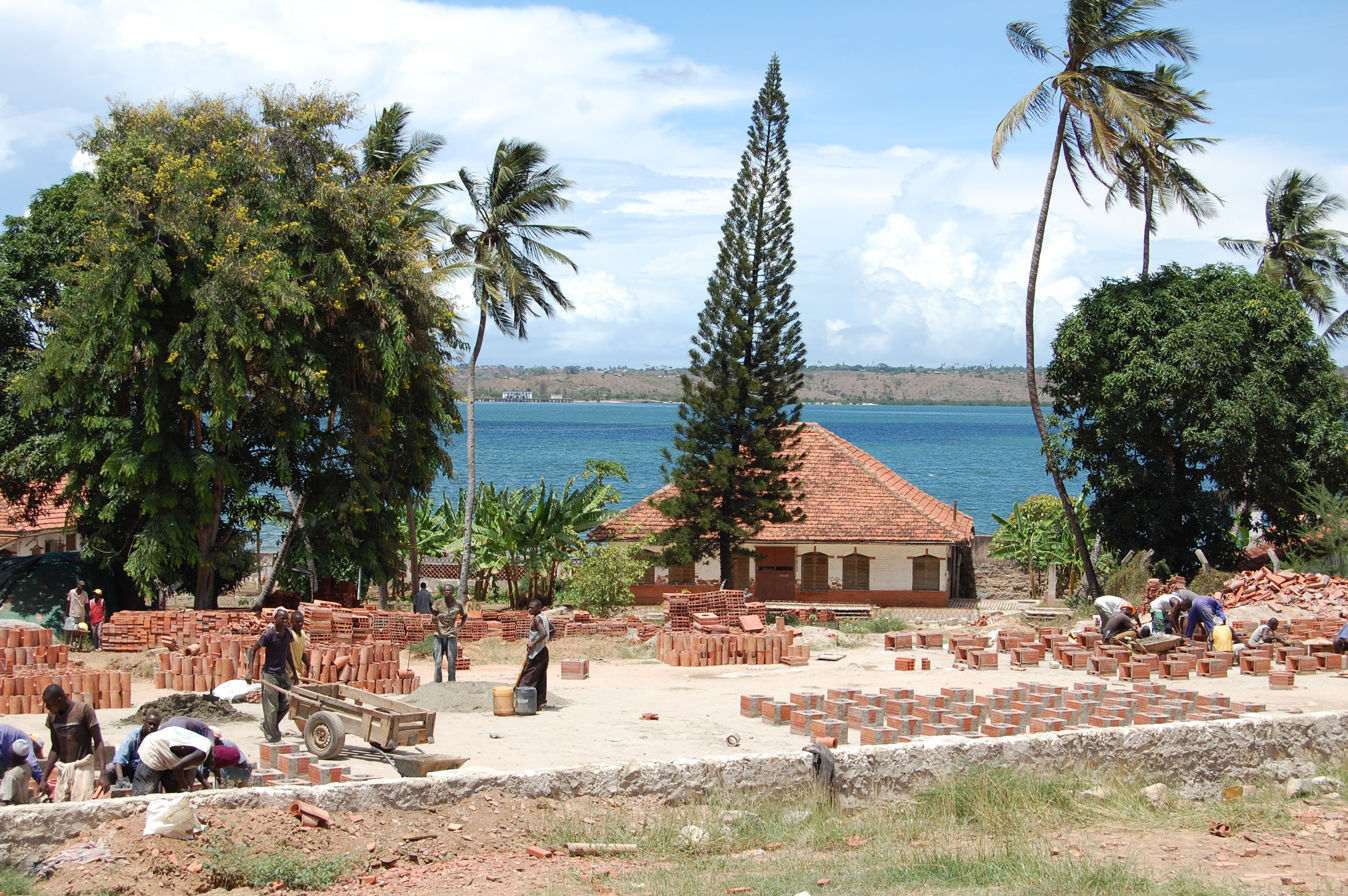
Workers building improved cookstoves as part of a CO2balance clean cooking project in Kenya.

CO2balance projects contribute primarily to the following SDGs:

- SDG 3: Good Health and Wellbeing: by reducing exposure to household air pollution and water borne diseases.
- SDG 5: Gender Equality: by reducing time-poverty amongst women who disproportionately carry out unpaid domestic duties.
- SDG 6: Clean Water and Sanitation: by providing access to safe water for communities without improved water sources.
- SDG 7: Affordable and Clean Energy: by replacing inefficient traditional cooking methods with improved clean cooking technology.
- SDG 13: Climate Action: by reducing the amount of wood burned to cook and purify water, reducing carbon emissions.

=== Carbon management ===
CO2balance works with businesses on a range of carbon management services, such as carbon footprinting, energy efficiency assessments, life cycle analyses and carbon offsetting. Footprinting and life cycle assessments typically represent the first step in the carbon management process and are used to identify the key sources of emissions within an organisation's operations and any potential areas of savings. Audits are conducted to comply with BSI PAS 2060, ISO 14064 and the Greenhouse Gas Protocol Product Life Cycle Accounting and Reporting Standard 2011. Footprints may then be negated via the purchase of project-generated carbon credits. CO2balance also conducts carbon and energy auditing for large companies’ Energy Savings Opportunity Scheme (ESOS) assessment reports.

CO2balance has worked with organisations such as Toshiba, Canon Medical and Sky.

=== CarbonZero ===
CarbonZero is a standard set up by CO2balance. It is provided under license to client organisations for whom a product, service or their entire operations have achieved a net carbon footprint of zero, achieved by purchasing CO2balance carbon credits. Organisations that have been branded CarbonZero include Toshiba, Canon Medical and Hill Dickinson.

=== Corporate social responsibility ===
CO2balance offers a corporate social responsibility service to corporate clients, to complement the environmental and social benefits of their climate protection projects. Such CSR projects focus on developing key facilities within rural communities, such as WASH facilities for schools, disease management training, solar systems and renovation of healthcare centres.

== See also ==
- Climate change
- Carbon finance
- Gold Standard
- Clean Development Mechanism
- Voluntary Carbon Standard
- Sustainable Development Goals
- Corporate social responsibility
- International Carbon Reduction and Offset Alliance (ICROA)
