= ClimateCare =

- Type: Privately held company
- Industry: Green
- Founded: 1997
- Founders: Mike Mason, Edward Hanrahan and Tom Morton
- Headquarters: Oxford, United Kingdom
- Number of locations: 3 (United Kingdom, Kenya, India)
- Area served: Worldwide
- Products: Carbon offsets, RECs, Social impact outcomes
- Services: CSR programmes, Government Aid Programmes, Supply Chain and market development projects in India and Africa
- Website: climatecare.org

ClimateCare is a profit for purpose environmental and social impact company known for its role providing carbon offset services, with a particular focus on using carbon and other results based finance to support its 'Climate+Care Projects'. It also provides businesses and governments with sustainable development programmes, environmental and social impact measurement and project development.

The company was founded in 1997 with a focus on projects that cut carbon and fund social development. ClimateCare is a certified B Corporation and a founding member of the B Corporation movement in the UK. The company has offices in the UK, India, and Kenya.

== History ==
ClimateCare was founded in 1997 to encourage organisations and individuals to take voluntary action on climate change. In 2001, ClimateCare was contracted by The Co-operative Bank to replant part of the rainforest in the Kibale National Park as part of the bank's effort to create a carbon neutral mortgage product.

In 2007, ClimateCare worked with The Travel Foundation to establish the World Care Fund, the largest emission reduction programme in the travel industry. On 24 August 2007, ClimateCare announced that it had delivered its first million tonnes of greenhouse gas emission reductions. Climate Care was sold to J.P.Morgan in 2008 and became part of its Environmental Markets business. It was taken private through a Management Buy Out in 2011 and began operating under a 'profit for purpose' business model. In 2012, ClimateCare worked with the Kenyan government to develop a 10-year National Climate Change plan. In 2014, ClimateCare was awarded the Queen's Awards for Enterprise for its contribution to addressing climate change.

In April 2016, the company announced it has funded over 20.6 million tonnes of greenhouse gas emission reductions worldwide and improved the lives of 16.5 million people. In 2018 ClimateCare was ranked as the number one B Corporation in the UK.

== Operations ==
ClimateCare designs and delivers projects that deliver against multiple Sustainable Development Goals and measures both environmental and social outcomes from these projects. It uses a market approach to sustainable development, kick starting markets for live enhancing goods and services. The company developed a Revolving Fund model which it is using to create a new market for clean burning ethanol cookers in Kenya, helping the community to leapfrog traditional development pathways. ClimateCare also works with corporations by measuring their carbon, natural capital and social impacts, and has worked with organisations such as Jaguar Land Rover and Aviva.

=== ClimateCare projects ===
ClimateCare funds many projects around the world mainly in developing countries with the aim of reducing greenhouse gas emissions and supporting sustainable development in these countries. Projects are submitted to various independent standards to ensure accuracy, additionality and verification that emissions reductions are achieved. Standards for carbon offsetting include the Gold Standard, developed by charities such as WWF, and the Voluntary Carbon Standard developed by The Climate Group.

Cookstove projects: In 2009, ClimateCare partnered with Impact Carbon and registered the first voluntary Gold Standard cookstove project. This project creates a market for fuel-efficient stoves in households and institutions throughout Uganda. These stoves use less charcoal than traditional cooking methods, cutting carbon emissions and reducing indoor air pollution, making them much less damaging to the health of the cooks and their families. As of June 2016, the partnership had sold more than 835,000 stoves, while creating over 700 jobs and cutting 824,977 tonnes of carbon emissions.

In November 2014, the company partnered with Safi International to distribute ethanol cookstoves in Kenya. Through a mixture of micro-financing, government subsidies and carbon finance, ClimateCare was able create a revolving market for the stoves that allowed the initial capital to be reused. ClimateCare has also used a revolving fund model on the Pamoja Life project that helps provide cookstoves, solar lighting and other low-carbon products to very poor people in east Africa.

LifeStraw Carbon for Water: In 2012, ClimateCare partnered with health company Vestergaard Frandsen to develop this project that uses carbon finance to fund provision of safe water to 4 million people in Western Kenya. The project was the first in the world to link carbon credits with water provision at scale and has won awards including the Carbon Finance Transaction of the Year award 2012.

AquaClara project: In 2014, the Non-profit organisation Aqua Clara International, partnered with ClimateCare to establish a water purification project in Kenya, manufacturing and distributing household water filters that replace the need to boil water. The resulting emissions reductions are measured, independently verified and sold to businesses that want to reduce their unavoidable carbon footprint by supporting projects that improve people's lives as well as the environment.

The project is funded through the sale of carbon credits and, as a result, an estimated 18,750 families will have safe water by May 2017.

== See also ==
- B corporation
- Carbon neutrality
- Carbon offset
- CDM Gold Standard
- Climate change
- International Carbon Reduction and Offset Alliance
- Sustainable business
- Voluntary Carbon Standard
