= Christoph Sutter =

Swiss carbon expert and entrepreneur (born 1973)

- Born: 20 March 1973; Basel, Switzerland
- Occupation: Carbon professional
- Children: 1 son

Christoph Sutter (born 20 March 1973) is a Swiss carbon expert and entrepreneur. Christoph attended the Swiss Federal Institute of Technology where he studied for an MSc in environmental science (1993–1999) and a master of didactics on environmental science. He also concluded his PhD on the topic, "Sustainability Assessment of CDM Projects under the Kyoto Protocol" at the same school. His thesis was awarded the ETH medal for the best PhD thesis in 2003. He completed his education with a McKinsey mini MBA in Toronto in Summer 2005.

After working for the consultancy Ernst Basler & Partner in Zurich during his studies he was part of setting up the myclimate foundation based on his PhD results. Myclimate is an offset provider for the voluntary offsetting market, focused on CDM Gold Standard certificates. During this activity, Christoph was called to work for the UNFCCC Methodology Panel in 2005 where he worked for 3 years. Unsatisfied with the exclusive focus on voluntary offsetting, he later founded the company South Pole Carbon with his former colleagues Thomas Camerata and Renat Heuberger.

He was co-CEO of South Pole Carbon Asset Management Ltd from 2006 until 2012, and continues to act as non-executive chairman and shareholder. On 1 June 2012 he joined Swiss power generator Axpo as head of asset development.

He was awarded as one of the WEF Young Global Leaders in 2009.

Additionally, Sutter is actively engaged in the work–life balance community, as he reduced his workload to 80%, taking off on Fridays after the birth of his son.
