= Architecture for REDD+ Transactions =

Carbon-crediting programme for jurisdictional REDD+

- Abbreviation: ART
- Formation: 2018; 8 years ago
- Type: Carbon-crediting programme
- Headquarters: Little Rock, Arkansas, United States
- Website: artredd.org

Architecture for REDD+ Transactions (ART) is a carbon-crediting programme for jurisdictional and national Reducing emissions from deforestation and forest degradation (REDD+) activities. Established in 2018, it administers The REDD+ Environmental Excellence Standard (TREES), a standard for the quantification, monitoring, reporting and verification of forest-sector greenhouse gas emission reductions and removals at national and eligible subnational scale.

ART is governed by an independent advisory board, while daily operations are managed by the ART Secretariat, hosted by Winrock International. The programme also oversees validation and verification procedures and a public registry for participant documents, the issuance of carbon credits, and other programme records.

ART received broader public attention after the first TREES credits were issued to Guyana in 2022, after TREES-certified credits were used in purchase arrangements associated with the LEAF Coalition, and after the Integrity Council for the Voluntary Carbon Market (ICVCM) approved ART as a Core Carbon Principles (CCP)-Eligible programme in 2024 and approved the non-HFLD TREES 2.0 crediting level later that year. ART and TREES have also drawn criticism over high forest, low deforestation (HFLD) crediting, consultation with Indigenous peoples, and the operation of safeguards and grievance procedures.

== History ==
ART was established in 2018 as a market-based initiative intended to incentivise the protection and restoration of tropical forests at jurisdictional scale.

The first version of TREES was published in February 2020. In August 2021 the ART Board approved TREES 2.0, which expanded the standard beyond avoided deforestation and forest degradation to include optional HFLD and removals approaches and wider stakeholder participation pathways.

Guyana became the first jurisdiction to have credits issued under ART-TREES. By 2023 it remained the only jurisdiction for which a claim had been verified and credits issued under the system, following the submission of an ART programme concept in 2020 and a credit claim for 2016–2020 results in 2022. In February 2024 Guyana became the first country to make TREES credits available under CORSIA after completing the required corresponding-adjustment steps.

In 2024 the ICVCM approved ART as a CCP-Eligible carbon-crediting programme. Later that year it approved the non-HFLD TREES 2.0 crediting level as part of wider efforts to restore confidence in scrutinised REDD+ credits. Separate consideration of the HFLD and removals approaches remained pending in 2026.

In January 2025 ART and the American Carbon Registry (ACR) announced a planned early-2026 transition to Intercontinental Exchange's GreenTrace registry platform.

=== Selected milestones ===
Selected milestones in the development of ART
Date	Development
2018	ART is established as a jurisdictional REDD+ carbon-crediting programme.
February 2020	First version of TREES is published.
August 2021	ART Board approves TREES 2.0, adding optional HFLD and removals approaches.
December 2022	ART issues the first TREES credits to Guyana.
April 2024	ICVCM approves ART as a CCP-Eligible carbon-crediting programme.
November 2024	ICVCM approves the non-HFLD TREES 2.0 crediting level.
January 2025	ART and ACR announce a planned transition to ICE GreenTrace registry technology.

== Aims ==
ART is intended as a jurisdictional REDD+ framework designed to unlock finance for forest protection and restoration by standardising how large-scale results are measured, verified and issued as carbon credits. Its governance structure combines standard-setting, independent validation and verification, registry administration and public programme documentation. Advisory board members serve in their personal capacities rather than as representatives of specific organisations or stakeholder groups.

ART is often discussed alongside the Verified Carbon Standard jurisdictional and nested REDD+ framework and UNFCCC REDD+ results-based finance as one of the principal jurisdictional approaches in the forest carbon market.

== Standards and operations ==
ART's principal standard is TREES, under which countries and eligible subnational jurisdictions can generate verified emission reduction and removal credits by meeting requirements on accounting, safeguards, monitoring, reporting and verification. TREES 2.0 introduced optional approaches for HFLD jurisdictions and for jurisdictional removals.

The programme requires independent third-party validation and verification before credits are issued. ART publishes programme information through its registry, and its public ART Registry includes reports on listed programmes, issued credits, retired credits, cancelled credits, buffer-pool balances, and Article 6 and CORSIA information.

Because ART operates at jurisdictional scale, it must address the relationship between jurisdictional programmes and project-level activities within the same landscape, making nesting a recurrent issue in policy guidance.

== Market role ==
ART has been closely associated with the LEAF Coalition, which uses TREES-certified credits in its purchase arrangements and became a major buyer of jurisdictional TREES credits. ART TREES also formed part of wider efforts to standardise verification for higher-integrity forest carbon credits after prolonged scrutiny of the voluntary carbon market.

ART has also been linked to CORSIA. By 2025 it was one of the existing standards approved to supply units to the aviation scheme, and Guyana remained the only country so far to provide TREES credits with a corresponding adjustment for that purpose. In November 2024 the Brazilian state of Tocantins announced plans to offer credits under ART-TREES, reflecting the programme's growing role in proposed jurisdictional carbon-market transactions.

ART has also featured in debates over how Article 6 of the Paris Agreement authorisation and corresponding adjustments interact with voluntary carbon markets.

== Reception and criticism ==
Because ART's public role centres on TREES, criticism of ART has focused largely on the design and implementation of the standard. Critics have argued that ART's HFLD approach can award credits for hypothetical future deforestation and therefore over-credit intact-forest jurisdictions; Guyana has often been used as the main example in that debate. Supporters, including some researchers and market groups, have argued that historical baselines alone can under-reward jurisdictions maintaining large intact forests under rising pressure and have defended HFLD crediting as a way to direct finance before deforestation accelerates.

Concerns have also focused on consultation and grievance procedures. In 2023 the Amerindian Peoples Association said it was reviewing ART's decision on its complaint about Guyana's carbon credits, including whether free, prior and informed consent and other TREES requirements had been met. Public submissions on draft TREES 3.0 later called for stronger safeguards, clearer rules and methodological changes, including proposals from Rainforest Foundation Norway and the Öko-Institut.
