= CarbonFix Standard =

Initiative to certify climate forestation projects to sequester carbon

The CarbonFix Standard (CFS) was an initiative to certify climate forestation projects to sequester carbon from the atmosphere. The CarbonFix Standard was administered by CarbonFix, a non-profit association based in Germany. In 2012, it was acquired by and integrated into the Gold Standard.

== History ==
The association CarbonFix was founded in 1999. In 2007, the association developed the first version of the CarbonFix Standard, which was presented at the World Climate Conference in Bali, in December 2007.

The standard contained criteria a forestation project had to meet in order to be certified. Sustainable Forest Management was required.

== See also ==
- Voluntary Carbon Standard
- Carbon Credit
- SGS S.A.
- Woodland Carbon Code
