= BBC Radio Somerset =

BBC Local Radio service for the ceremonial county of Somerset, England

Coordinates: 51°00′50″N 3°06′25″W

- Taunton; England
- Broadcast area: Somerset
- Frequencies: FM: 95.5 MHz (Mendip); AM: 1566 kHz (until the end of November 2026); DAB: 10B; Freeview: 714
- RDS: BBC SOMS

Programming
- Language: English
- Format: Local news, talk and music

Ownership
- Owner: BBC Local Radio, BBC South West, BBC West

History
- First air date: 11 April 1988
- Former names: BBC Somerset Sound (1988–2007); BBC Somerset (2007–2020)
- Former frequencies: 1323 MW

Technical information
- Licensing authority: Ofcom

Links
- Website: BBC Radio Somerset

BBC Radio Somerset is the BBC's local radio station serving the county of Somerset, England.

It broadcasts on FM, AM (until the end of November 2026), DAB, digital TV and via BBC Sounds from studios in the Blackbrook area of Taunton.

According to RAJAR, the station has a weekly audience of 55,000 listeners and a 7.2% share as of December 2023.

== History ==
The first BBC service for the county of Somerset was established in 1978, as an emergency measure following storms in the county.

=== BBC Somerset Sound (1988–2007) ===
The station proper was launched as BBC Somerset Sound on 11 April 1988, broadcasting as a part-time station on BBC Radio Bristol's former frequency of 1323 medium wave, opting out of BBC Radio Bristol for a few hours each day. It was based in studios above a café on Paul St, Taunton, run by producer-in-charge, Clinton Rogers and news producer Anne Ashworth, with a smaller satellite studio in Yeovil run by district producer, Steve Haigh. The signal on 1323 MW was for many years interfered with by a radio station in Russia.

In August 2002, BBC Somerset Sound moved to new premises in Park Street, Taunton, and acquired a more robust frequency of 1566 MW.

=== BBC Somerset (2007–2020) ===
In 2007, the station relaunched as BBC Somerset, with the launch of the BBC Somerset bus in May. On 3 December of that year, the station was given BBC Radio Bristol's former frequency of 95.5 FM, and broadcasts to the whole county of Somerset (including the unitary districts of North Somerset and Bath and North East Somerset) and beyond. Listeners from as far afield as Finland have reported hearing the station clearly. BBC Somerset sometimes uses its AM frequency for cricket commentary while regular programming continues on FM. BBC Somerset began broadcasting on DAB in September 2014.

BBC Somerset was for many years an 'opt-out' from BBC Radio Bristol, but in May 2012, the BBC established it as a station in its own right. The BBC's Annual Report and Accounts for 2005/2006 stated: "The BBC is committed to extending its network of local radio stations to a limited number of under served areas, and BBC management is carrying out preparatory work for new stations in Somerset, Dorset and Cheshire".

On 6 October 2011, the BBC announced that it intended to close BBC Somerset's 1566 MW frequency as part of its Delivering Quality First (DQF) programme of cutbacks. No decision on the timing of the medium wave switch-off has yet been made.

In November 2017, BBC Somerset moved from the Park Street premises to a new building on the edge of Taunton in Blackbrook.

=== BBC Radio Somerset (2020–present) ===
On 27 April 2020, the station changed its name to BBC Radio Somerset in order to fit the station name into the new jingle package.

On 5 July 2020, the station switched from the BBC West feed to join BBC South West.

In September 2023, the station joined again with BBC Radio Bristol sharing some programmes.

== Programming ==
Local weekday programmes are produced and broadcast from the BBC's Taunton studios from 6 am to 2 pm. The weekday afternoon programme is shared with BBC Radio Bristol. Evening weekday programmes are shared across the BBC West region. The 10 pm to 1 am Late Show is a programme broadcast across England and the Channel Islands from either London or Manchester.

Weekend 6 am to 2 pm programmes are broadcast across the BBC West region. Saturday sport (2 pm to 6 pm) is a shared programme with BBC Radio Bristol with the option to broadcast local commentaries. Saturday evenings are region wide shared programmes,

Sunday afternoons are shared with BBC Radio Bristol. After 6pm all programmes are national.

Overnight, BBC Radio Somerset simulcasts BBC Radio 5 Live between 1 am and 6 am.

== Technical ==
The service is broadcast across Somerset on 95.5 FM from the Mendip transmitting station located on the summit of Pen Hill, part of the Mendip Hills. The station also broadcasts on 1566 kHz medium wave, but is however planned to be switched off at the end of November 2026, as part of the final phase of the medium wave switch-offs of BBC Local Radio.

BBC Radio Somerset broadcasts DAB from different transmitters, including Mendip, Taunton, Coker Hill, and Hutton.

The station also broadcasts on Freeview TV channel 714 in the BBC South West and BBC West regions and streams online via BBC Sounds.

== The Challenge ==
BBC Somerset took part in The Challenge

In 2007, BBC Somerset took part in an initiative to create the first carbon-zero radio station in the UK known as The Challenge.

Carbon auditors CO2balance analysed every aspect of the operation – from the mileage of the transport fleet down to what happens to the office tea bags.

At the time of the audit, the station generated more than 64 tonnes of CO_{2} each year. On hearing the results the staff voluntarily dipped into their pockets to fund the three main accredited methods of carbon offsetting – tree planting, sustainable projects and carbon trading. On average the cost to each member of staff was between £25 and £50, depending on their salary. Staff also looked at all areas where pollution is generated to reduce the station's carbon footprint and make it more environmentally friendly. These included:

- The fleet of cars for reporters were swapped for fuel-efficient vans.
- Lighting systems were replaced with more energy-efficient ones.
- Loft insulation was improved and double glazing was considered.
- The electricity and paper supplies were checked to make sure they are eco-friendly.
- Water coolers were removed in favour of tap water.
- New recycling measures were introduced.
- Eco-friendly cleaning products were introduced.

== Presenters ==
=== Current presenters ===
- Charlie Taylor (Weekday Breakfast)
- Simon Parkin (Weekday Daytimes)
- Claire Carter (Afternoons Mon-Thurs)
- Andy Bennett (Friday Afternoons and Weekend Daytimes)
- Caroline Martin (Weekend Breakfast)
- Jack Killah (Total Sport - Friday evenings)

=== Former presenters ===
- Carrie Davis
- Fi Glover
- Ben McGrail
- Geoff Twentyman

== Awards and nominations ==
Year	Association	Category	Nominee(s)	Result
2017	Diversity in Media Awards	Radio Programme / Station of the Year	BBC Somerset	Nominated
