= BSI PAS 2060 =

British standard for measuring carbon neutrality

PAS 2060 was a Publicly Available Specification which detailed how to demonstrate an organisation's carbon neutrality. It was produced and published by the British Standards Institution (BSI).

== History ==
The BSI announced the development of the PAS 2060 Standard for Carbon Neutrality in October 2009 with the objective of increasing the transparency of carbon neutrality claims by providing a common definition and recognized method of achieving carbon neutral status.

The steering group was made up of a number of public and private organisations and associations, including the Association of British Certification Bodies, Aviva, BREEAM (BRE Environmental Assessment Method), Carbon Clear, The Carbon Neutral Company, EcoAct, The Carbon Trust, The Co-operative Group, Department of Energy and Climate Change, Eurostar, Future Conversations (Concrete Centre), Good Energy, Institute of Environmental Management and Assessment, Marks and Spencer, Oxford Brookes University and UPM-Kymmene.

The specification for the demonstration of carbon neutrality was launched in June 2010, and an updated version of the specification was published in 2014.

BSI published BS ISO 14068-1:2023 "Climate change management. Transition to net zero - Carbon neutrality" on 30 November 2023, and PAS 2060 was withdrawn from use on 30 November 2025.

== Compliance with PAS 2060 ==
The specification defined a consistent set of measures and requirements for entities (e.g. organisations, governments, communities, families, individuals) to demonstrate carbon neutrality for a product, service, organisation, community, event or building.

The carbon footprint measurements should include 100% of Scope 1 and Scope 2 emissions, plus all Scope 3 emissions that contribute more than 1% of the total footprint.

The entity must develop a Carbon Management Plan which contains a public commitment to carbon neutrality and outlines the following major aspects of the reduction strategy: a time scale, specific targets for reductions, the planned means of achieving reductions and how residual emissions will be offset.

PAS 2060 requires that the total amount of carbon emissions at the end of a reduction period be offset by high-quality, certified carbon credits which meet the following criteria:

• From one of the PAS 2060 approved schemes (for example the Clean Development Mechanism, Joint Implementation or Verified Carbon Standard) • Genuinely additional (i.e. reductions that would not have happened anyway) • Verified by an independent third party to ensure that emission reductions are permanent, avoid leakage (so that emissions are not increased in another area as a result of the project reductions) and are not double counted • Retired after a maximum of 12 months to a credible registry.

== Documentation and verification ==
PAS 2060 required a standard-compliant declaration of achievement of neutrality through a set of Qualifying Explanatory Statements and public disclosure of all the documentation that supports the carbon neutrality claim.

The standard stipulated three types of validation of the achievement of neutrality: self validation, other party validation and third party independent validation. Other party validation occurred when the methodology and data had been audited and verified by an external organisation; third party independent validation occurred when it is verification is by an agent registered with UKAS.
