= Bastien Girod =

Swiss politician (born 1980)

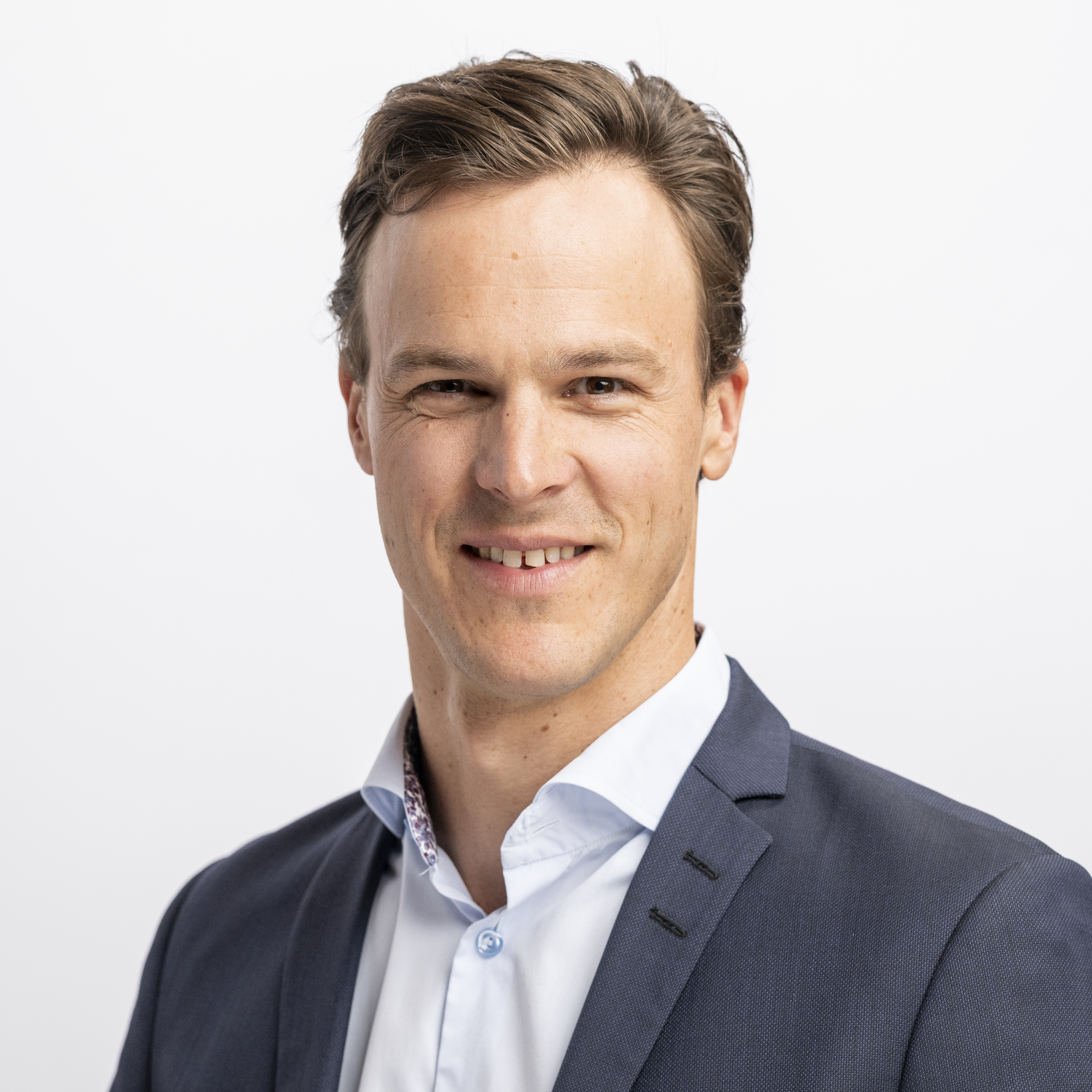
- Official portrait, 2023

Member of the National Council
- Incumbent
- Assumed office 3 December 2007
- Succeeded by: Meret Schneider
- Constituency: Canton of Zurich

Personal details
- Born: Bastien Girod; 21 December 1980 (age 45) Geneva, Switzerland
- Party: Green Party of Switzerland
- Spouse: Ellen Tkatch (m. 2012; sep. 2023)
- Children: 2
- Education: ETH Zurich, University of Zurich
- Occupation: Researcher, lecturer, politician
- Committees: environment, spatial planning and energy committee
- Website: Official website Parliament website

Bastien Girod (French: [bas.tjɛ̃ ʒi.ʁo]; born 21 December 1980) is a Swiss sustainability researcher, corporate and industry advisor and politician who serves as a member of the National Council for the Green Party since 2007. In August 2024, Girod announced to step back from office, and designated Meret Schneider as his successor.

== Early life and education ==
Girod was born 21 December 1980 in Geneva, Switzerland. He has one sister as well as a half-brother and half-sister from his fathers previous marriages. Additionally his family took-in three foster children. He was raised in Biel/Bienne. His family was well situated with his father being a physician and his mother a social worker.

He received a private Waldorf education and then at the German-speaking high school in Biel/Bienne. Ultimately, Girod studied environmental science at ETH Zurich as well as at Utrecht University in the Netherlands. He had later completed an Executive MBA at the University of Zürich.

== Career ==
Girod is lecturer (Privatdozent) at the ETH Zurich on Sustainability and Technology. He also holds an Executive MBA from the University of Zurich, conducted a PhD at ETH Zurich with the title „Integration of Rebound Effects into Life-Cycle Assessment“.

Since 2018 Bastien Girod works at South Pole Group as corporate sustainability advisor and head of the DACH business development unit. In the same year he took over the presidency of the industry association for Swiss waste revalorization plants (VBSA), which is committed to a sustainable Swiss waste system.

== Politics ==
Since 2007, Bastien Girod (Green Party) has been an elected member of the Swiss national council, where he serves on the environment, spatial planning and energy committee.

== Personal life ==
In 2012, Girod married Ellen Tkatch (born 1984), a native of Ukraine, a communications executive and former Miss Zurich 2005. They have two daughters, Ari Girod (born 2014) and Lin (born 2017). They legally separated in 2023.

Girod resides in Zürich West.
