= TerraPass =

Social enterprise providing carbon offsets

- Industry: Social enterprise
- Successor: JustGreen
- Area served: United States
- Products: Carbon offsetting
- Website: www.terrapass.com

TerraPass is a social enterprise that provides carbon offsetting products. TerraPass use proceeds from member purchases to fund greenhouse gas reduction projects.

== Carbon portfolio ==
TerraPass's projects is divided into four project types, all based in the United States:

- Wind energy – TerraPass purchased Green-e-certified wind Renewable Energy Certificates (RECs) from wind farms and calculates the carbon reduction from these RECs based on the EPA eGRID methodology.
- Farm methane digesters (or "Farm Power") – TerraPass funds emissions reductions from digesters that collect the methane from animal manure on dairy farms and burn it, which often generates renewable energy.
- Landfill methane flaring – TerraPass funds reductions from landfill flaring of methane, collected from decomposing garbage.
- Clean energy – TerraPass funds wind energy after calculating the "environmental gains" with the “carbon profile” of the electricity grid.

== History ==
=== Acquisition by Just Energy Group ===
In 2014, TerraPass sold its retail carbon offset business to JustGreen, a subsidiary of the Just Energy Group Inc., a Canada-based competitive retailer of natural gas and electricity. JustGreen assumed the TerraPass brand. The remaining TerraPass Energy & Wholesale group renamed itself Origin Climate.

=== Partnerships ===
TerraPass has entered into several business partnerships:

- In August 2006, TerraPass began selling airplane emission offsets through Expedia. Expedia offsets are intended to offset the specific flight(s) booked through the travel site.
- In January 2007, TerraPass partnered with uShip.com to provide a "TerraPass Certified Green Provider Program" to shipping companies wishing to do so.
- In June 2007, Flexcar partnered with TerraPass to provide a premium "Green Membership". In addition to regular Flexcar privileges.

=== Hidden Fees Lawsuit ===
In July 2025, TerraPass entered into a consent order with the California Department of Financial Protection and Innovation to settle a DFPI lawsuit over TerraPass' failure to disclose to consumers that it was pocketing 40% of carbon offset credit purchases for its own operating costs. TerraPass was ordered to refund $68,500 in undisclosed fees to nine California businesses and 621 California consumers.

== Verification ==
TerraPass tries to reduce greenhouse gas against the Verified Carbon Standard. All of the RECs TerraPass purchases are Green-e certified through the Center for Resource Solutions. The primary standards they use are Verified Carbon Standard and the Climate Action Reserve.

TerraPass is audited according to guidelines established by the Center for Resource Solutions. The focus of the audit is to verify that TerraPass fulfills its carbon purchase obligations on behalf of its customers; to enforce certain carbon portfolio quality standards; and to review TerraPass marketing language and disclosure policies.

Adam Stein, co-founder and VP of Marketing, was an occasional contributor to environmental news site Grist Magazine.
