= Global Carbon Council =

MENA region's carbon offsetting program

Global Carbon Council (GCC), formerly known as Global Carbon Trust (GCT), is MENA region's first voluntary carbon offsetting program. It facilitates global stakeholders in implementing climate actions through provision of voluntary carbon offsetting program.

The overall purpose of GCC is to contribute to achieve Paris Agreement objective of limiting global warming to 1.5 °C by developing relevant standards and framework and by providing price signal to the market to catalyze, enhance and leverage climate change mitigation finance globally and especially for MENA region, which has largely remained under-represented in using carbon market instruments to catalyze climate actions.

On 19 March 2021, Global Carbon Council received full approval under Carbon Offsetting and Reduction Scheme for International Aviation (CORSIA) of United Nations' International Civil Aviation Organization (ICAO). Following CORSIA's approval, Global Carbon Council has been listed among select international programs qualified to supply carbon credits to international airlines in order to meet their carbon neutral growth targets. Based in Qatar, Global Carbon Council is now one of the two CORSIA-eligible international GHG programs that are headquartered in developing countries. GCC has also received full endorsement from the International Carbon Reduction and Offset Alliance (ICROA).

Presided by noted Qatari environmentalist Dr. Yousef Alhorr, Global Carbon Council is facilitating organizations to implement carbon reduction projects and issue carbon credits that will be used to deliver, as indicated by the organizing parties, a carbon-neutral 2022 FIFA World Cup and many other potential carbon neutrality purposes. Global Carbon Council is a member of the International Emissions Trading Association (IETA). Within MENA region, it is the first and only global voluntary GHG offsetting program.

== Coverage, certifications and labels ==
GHG reduction projects recognized by Global Carbon Council aim to mitigate six greenhouse gases i.e. Carbon dioxide (CO_{2}), Methane (CH_{4}), Nitrous oxide (N_{2}O), Hydrofluorocarbons (HFCs), Perfluorocarbons (PFCs) and Sulfur hexafluoride (SF_{6}). Apart from issuance of carbon credits, the Council incentivizes projects that in addition to reducing greenhouse-gas emissions, work towards the achievement of United Nations’ Sustainable Development Goals (SDGs) by applying Project Sustainability Standard. Depending on the number of SDGs obtained, projects are awarded with additional certification labels. Similarly, GHG reduction projects that voluntarily commit to cause no net-harm to the environment or to society during their operations are rewarded with additional certification labels: the Environmental No-net-harm Label (E+) and the Social No-net-harm Label (S+).

== GCC program framework ==
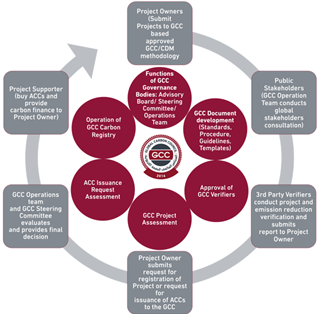
Program Framework of the Global Carbon Council

GCC Program has developed the governance structure, systems, carbon registry and the documentation framework to facilitate the building of low-carbon economies. This is via operation of a voluntary carbon marketplace to provide recognition of, and facilitate carbon finance for, GCC projects. The GCC Operations Team in Doha, Qatar serves as Secretariat of the GCC Program and works under the strategic advice of the GCC Advisory Board. Decisions on projects or issuance of Approved Carbon Credits (ACCs) are made collectively by the GCC Steering Committee, composed of nominated and recognized experts, based on a positive verification report by a GCC Verifier.

== Monitoring methodologies and registered GHG reduction projects ==
GCC Program develops methodologies for the potential project activities for which CDM methodologies are either not available or are too complex. The purpose of GCC methodology is to make them user friendly, and simple where possible, without compromising with their environmental integrity. GCC is receiving projects from countries representing various continents. GCC Program expects to issue more than 10 Million Carbon Credits in 2021.

== GCC carbon registry ==
The GCC program has a carbon registry which collates, displays, issues and transfers carbon credits (Approved Carbon Credits or ACCs) for a range of GHG reduction projects. The Program's Carbon Registry is designed, operated and maintained by S&P Global Commodity Insights that follows operational procedures related to the management of projects and units throughout the entire lifecycle of credits. The use of carbon registry helps prevent double counting and double issuance while ensuring complete transparency.

GCC Program is an Advisory Board member for the work on the development of Global Carbon Credit Meta-Registry by S&P Global Commodity Insights, which once developed, will be the first global meta-registry aimed at providing transparency and efficient tracking, accounting and trade lifecycle management of carbon credits. The rationale behind a meta registry is to maintain transparency and prevent double counting and double issuance. GCC Program is supporting the development of Climate Warehouse by the World Bank.
