= Renat Heuberger =

Swiss businessman

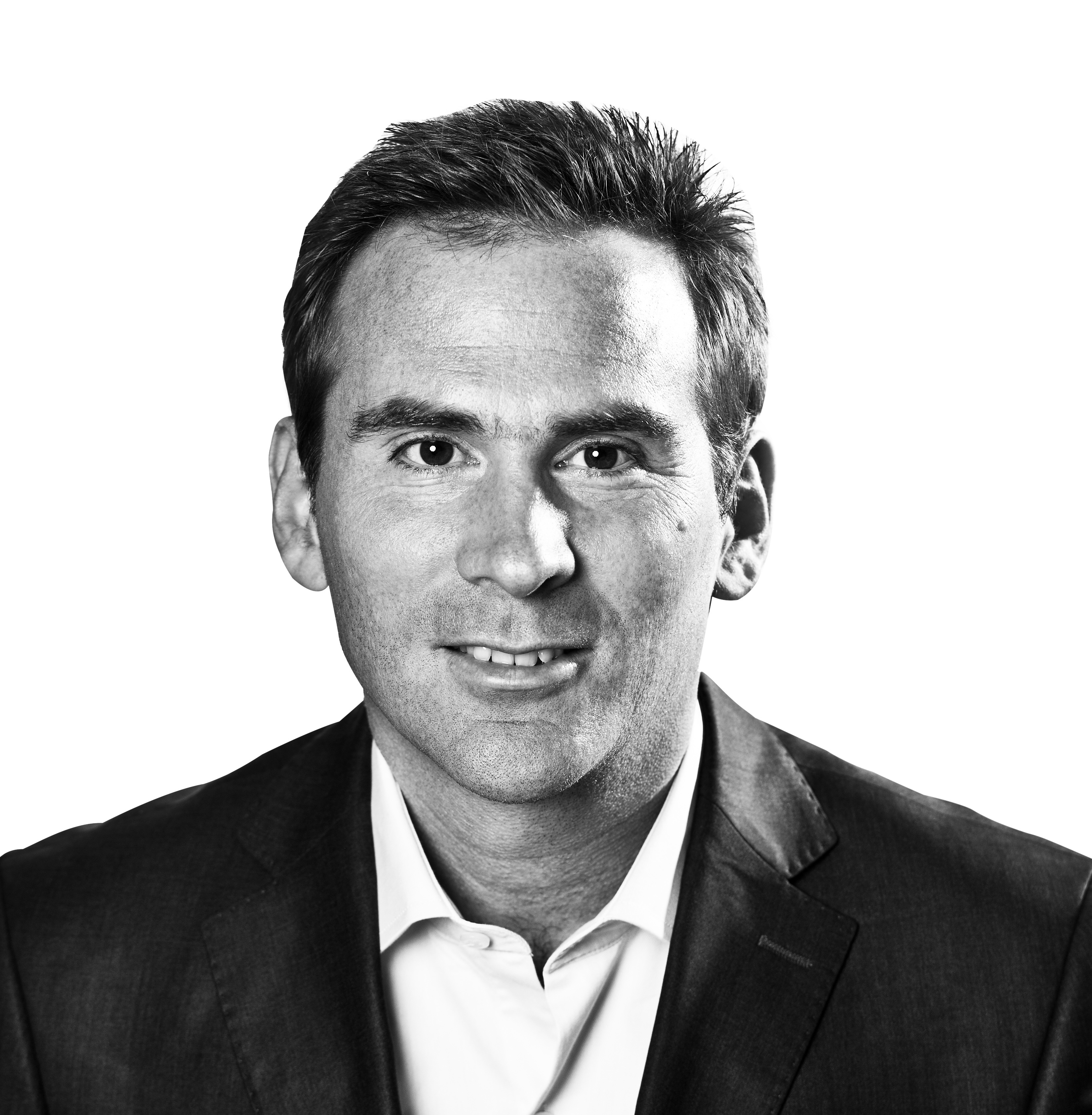
- Renat Heuberger (2014)
- Born: Renat Heuberger; 18 December 1976 (age 49); Zurich, Switzerland
- Occupations: CEO, Terra Impact Ventures

Renat Heuberger (born 18 December 1976) is a Serial Entrepreneur, Impact Investor, Author, and Board Member, active in climate and nature tech since 1999. He is co-founder of CEO of Terra Impact Ventures, a strategy advisor and company builder. He is Chairman of MPower, elected Innovation Council at InnoSuisse and serves on numerous boards. Prior to Terra, he was co-founder and CEO of South Pole. He has been engaged as a social entrepreneur in the fields of sustainability, climate change and renewable energies since 1999.

Before founding South Pole, Heuberger co-founded and acted as the CEO of the myclimate foundation.

Heuberger published the climate action drama The Carbon Paradox with co-authors Steve Zwick and Marco Hirsbrunner.

Heuberger holds a Master's in Environmental Sciences from the Swiss Federal Institute of Technology and completed the Social Entrepreneur Programme, ISEP, at INSEAD and Executive Education at Harvard Kennedy School (HKS).

== Professional life ==
After working for development organisation Swisscontact in Indonesia, Heuberger co-founded the World Student Community on Sustainable Development, as well as platform for interdisciplinary projects Seed Sustainability. In 2002, he founded the Swiss myclimate foundation, a non-profit climate protection organisation that was inspired by a successful initiative to compensate the greenhouse emissions of flights of attendees at the annual meeting of the Alliance for Global Sustainability in Costa Rica. Heuberger acted as my-climate's CEO until 2006. Heuberger then co-founded South Pole and led the company to one of the largest global climate platforms with over 1000 employees on 6 continents. South Pole was the broker and technical lead on a carbon credit scheme that was supposed to redirect funds to the Lake Kariba region in Zimbabwe and support the communities who protect it. Following exposés by Follow the Money, Die Zeit and the New Yorker, which raised concerns about the project's financial transparency and undisclosed trophy-hunting activity in the project area, Heuberger stepped down with immediate effect. Reflecting on the global attacks on carbon markets, Heuberger launched the platform Carbon Paradox to spark a broad discussion on the future of climate finance.

Heuberger has also supported the UNFCCC process regularly chairing and presenting at official side events on topics such as "Sustainable CDM - Best Practice" at CoP 11/MoP 1 of the UNFCCC in Montreal and "What has carbon trade taught us about ecological markets?" at CoP 16/MoP 6 of the UNFCCC Cancun Summit. Heuberger presented his Shifting Fortunes insight at the 2013 WEF in Davos.

== Awards and recognition ==
Heuberger was elected Social Entrepreneur of the Year by the Schwab Foundation. He was a finalist of the 2022 EY Entrepreneur of the Year award, won a YPO Global Impact Award in 2023 and was named runner-up in Illuminem's Most-Read Thought Leaders in Carbon.

== Positions of trust ==
Heuberger was elected Swiss Social Entrepreneur 2011 by the World Economic Forum’s Schwab Foundation, along with Christoph Sutter, and received the sustainability award in 2013 by the Zurich Cantonal Bank (ZKB). In 2014, Heuberger was elected as Member of the Global Agenda Council on Climate Change of the World Economic Forum.

Heuberger currently serves as a board member of Climate-KIC, Europe's largest public-private innovation partnership on climate change and is a member of the Innovation Council of InnoSuisse, the Swiss Innovation Agency. He is also a member of the Advisory Board of the Impact Hub Zurich, a platform for social entrepreneurship, and a member of the Expert Network of the World Economic Forum.

== Bibliography ==
- Heuberger R: “Mexico’s Clean Development Mechanism Potential”, Mexico Energy & Sustainability Review, p. 216 ff., 2014
- Heuberger R: “Transparenz im Strommarkt – wie kann die Marktliberalisierung zur Energiewende beitragen?” aus Tobias Reichmuth (Hrsg.) 2014: die Finanzierung der Energiewende in der Schweiz. Bestandsaufnahme, Massnahmen, Investitionsmöglichkeiten. NZZ Libro: Zürich, S. 69 f., 2014
- Heuberger R.: 'Der globale CO2-Handel nach der Klimakonferenz in Cancun, Umweltrecht in der Praxis' URP 2010 365, S. 821 f., 2010
- Heuberger Renat, Brent Alan, Santos, Luis, Sutter Christoph, Imboden Dieter, "CDM Projects under the Kyoto Protocol: A Methodology for Sustainability Assessment – Experiences from South Africa and Uruguay", "Environment, development and sustainability : a multidisciplinary approach to the theory and practice of sustainable development", Springer, doi:10.1007/s10668-005-9002-7, 2007.
- Heuberger R, Thomas F, "Quality standards for micro-climate protection projects""Qualitäts-Standards für Mikro-Klimaschutz-Projekte", Umwelt-Fokus, 2004.
- Renat Heuberger, Alan Brent, Luis Santos, Christoph Sutter, Dieter Imboden, "Evaluating projects that are potentially eligible for Clean Development Mechanism (CDM) funding in the South African context: A case study to establish weighting values for sustainable development criteria", ETH, doi:10.3929/ethz-a-004498711, 2003.
