= Climate, Community & Biodiversity Alliance =

Partnership in land management activities

- Founded: 2003
- Location: Arlington, Virginia, U.S.
- Members: CARE, Conservation International, The Nature Conservancy, Rainforest Alliance, WCS
- Website: www.climate-standards.org

The Climate, Community & Biodiversity Alliance (CCBA) is a partnership consisting of Conservation International, CARE, The Nature Conservancy, Rainforest Alliance, and the Wildlife Conservation Society that is primarily active in the field of land management activities.

The CCBA was established in 2003 with an aim to increase public and private investment in forest protection, restoration and agroforestry by developing standards intended to reduce the emissions of greenhouse gases.

The CCBA advocates for the adherence to Climate, Community, and Biodiversity (CCB) Standards, which are guidelines for investors, policymakers, project managers and civil society observers to evaluate land-based climate change mitigation projects by identifying projects that aid local communities and biodiversity, as well as delivering lower carbon offsets. CCB Standards are reviewed and revised by Centro Agronomico Tropical de Investigacion y Ensanansa, the World Agroforestry Center, and the Center for International Forestry Research. Other climate change mitigation standards supported by the CCBA include REDD+ Social and Environmental Standards, developed in collaboration with the governments of Ecuador, Nepal and Tanzania.

== History of the CCB Standards ==
The first draft of CCB Standards was written by the NGO coalition of the CCBA and opened to the public for a 3-month comment period in 2004. The draft CCB Standards were field-tested on existing and planned projects in Indonesia, Tanzania, Peru, Bolivia, Ecuador, Scotland, and Madagascar. A secondary draft was tested by CCBA advising institutions Centro Agronomico Tropical de Investigacion y Ensanansa, the World Agroforestry Center, and the Center for International Forestry Research. The First Edition of the Standards was released in May 2005.

In February 2008, the CCBA began a revision of the Standards as described in the Terms of Reference, Procedures and Work Plan for the Revision of the CCB Standards. The Second Edition of CCB Standards was released on Dec 6, 2008, at Forest Day 2 in Poznan, Poland. The Third Edition of the CCB Standards was released in December 2013.

== Use of the CCB Standards ==
Climate, Community & Biodiversity Alliance
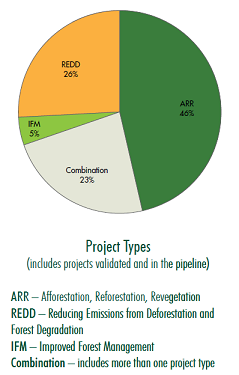

The CCB Standards provide rules and guidance for land-based carbon projects at any stage of implementation. Their goal is to assess a climate change mitigation project's design efficacy; suitability to local conditions; and climate, community, and biodiversity benefits. The standards can be combined with a carbon accounting standard, such as, the CarbonFix Standard (CFS), the Clean Development Mechanism (CDM) or the Voluntary Carbon Standard (VCS).

The Standards, now managed by the non-profit Verra, have been applied to nearly 200 projects, over 50 of which have achieved full verification. The projects cover over 60 countries on every continent except Antarctica. Projects validated and verified to the Standards encompass more than 10 million hectares.

== Structure of the CCB Standards ==
The Standards comprise fourteen required criteria and three optional "Gold Level” criteria. Once a project has been designed, a third-party evaluator uses indicators to determine if individual criteria are satisfied. Only projects that use best practices and deliver significant climate, community and biodiversity benefits earn CCB approval. Gold status is awarded to projects that satisfy one of the optional criteria by providing exceptional benefits including explicit design for adaptation to climate change, benefits for globally poorer communities, or conservation of biodiversity at sites of global conservation significance.

== CCB Standards Validation and Verification Process ==
The first step is an internal desk review of the project design against the CCB Standards. From here, any need for revision in the project's design, or gathering of documentation (evidence) for the audit is looked into.

Subsequently, an independent verifier does the CCB audit and validates the project. Currently, eligible CCB verifiers are accredited CDM verification bodies (Designated Operational Entities - DOEs). Once an independent verifier is chosen, a project design document (PDD) can be created, with the assistance of the CCB Validation Guidance document, and submitted to the CCBA for validation. The CCB audit and validation usually takes about two months or sometimes more depending on the audit findings. Typically, the CCB auditor reviews all the project documents and once they find that the documentation is sufficient and appropriate to proceed with an audit they forward the documents to the CCBA for the mandatory public comment period. Once the auditor evaluates the responses they write up the final audit & validation report and forward this with their statement of conformance to CCB Standards to the CCBA for publication on the CCBA website. In the end, the project is deemed “CCB validated”.

== Combined Use with Other Certification Systems ==
The CCB Standards can be combined with many other standards, such as the Clean Development Mechanism, or the Verified Carbon Standard. In this case, the CCB Standards provide a basis for evaluating a project’s social and environmental impact, while the carbon accounting standard enables verification and registration of quantified greenhouse gas emissions reductions or removals. In this way, the CCB Standards verify the social and environmental benefits generated by the project, enabling investors to select carbon credits with additional benefits, while screening out projects with unacceptable social and environmental impacts.

== See also ==
- CarbonFix Standard
- CARE
- Clean Development Mechanism
- Conservation International
- The Nature Conservancy
- Reducing emissions from deforestation and forest degradation
- Verified Carbon Standard
