= Jakob Maurer =

Swiss architect and urban planner

- Born: 28 December 1929; Uster, Switzerland
- Died: 30 May 2025 (aged 95); Zurich, Switzerland
- Education: ETH Zurich (1948–1952)
- Occupations: Architect, urban planner, professor
- Known for: Urban planning methodology, co-founding the Federation of Swiss Urban Planners
- Spouse: Hilde Lea Esposito (m. 1953)
- Parent(s): Jakob Maurer (father); Ida Zubler (mother)

Jakob Maurer (28 December 1929 – 30 May 2025) was a Swiss architect and urban planner who served as a professor at ETH Zurich and played a significant role in the development of spatial planning methodology in Switzerland. He was also a member of the Grand Council of Zurich representing the Alliance of Independents.

== Early life and education ==
Jakob Maurer was born on 28 December 1929 in Uster, Switzerland, to Jakob Maurer, an architect, and Ida Zubler. He was Protestant, and studied architecture at the Swiss Federal Institute of Technology (ETH) in Zurich from 1948 to 1952.

== Career ==
=== Architecture and early planning work ===
After completing his studies, Maurer worked as an employed or independent architect from 1952 to 1960. He then transitioned to urban planning, serving as head of the traffic planning office at the city of Zurich's building department from 1960 to 1962. From 1963 to 1967, he worked as technical director of regional planning for Zurich and surrounding areas.

=== Academic career ===
In 1966, Maurer completed his doctorate with a thesis on urban planning and research, focusing on urbanism. That same year, he was appointed assistant professor of local, regional and national planning at ETH Zurich. He was promoted to extraordinary professor in 1970 and to full professor of spatial planning methodology in 1977, a position he held until 1997.

During his academic career, Maurer co-founded the Federation of Swiss Urban Planners. His international work included projects in Germany, Austria, and France, where he served as a planner and consultant.

=== Political career ===
Maurer was active in politics as a member of the Alliance of Independents (AdI). He served as a deputy in the Grand Council of Zurich from 1963 to 1967.

== Personal life ==
In 1953, Maurer married Hilde Lea Esposito. He died on 30 May 2025 in Zurich at the age of 95.

== Bibliography ==
- Heer, Ernst; Scholl, Bernd; Signer, Rolf (éd.): Aspekte der Raumplanung in Europa. Festschrift für Jakob Maurer, 1990.
