= Carbon Clear =

UK sustainability consultancy

Carbon Clear Limited
- Company type: Private
- Industry: Environmental
- Founded: 2005
- Headquarters: London, N1, United Kingdom
- Number of locations: Barcelona, Texas, Istanbul, Ankara, Paris
- Area served: Worldwide
- Products: Sustainability consultancy

Carbon Clear is a sustainability consultancy. Carbon Clear is a founding member of the International Carbon Reduction and Offset Alliance (ICROA).

Carbon Clear was acquired by EcoAct Group in 2017.

== History ==
In 2005, sustainable energy expert Jamal Gore and entrepreneur Mark Chadwick created Carbon Clear. Since then the market for sustainability management services has grown in line with the need for private and public sector organisations to reduce their greenhouse gas emissions, in response to new climate change legislation and the imperative for voluntary action.

The company headquarters is in London, UK, and the company now operates offices in the United States, Spain, France and Turkey. It was recognised by the ENDS Report in 2008 as a Quality Offset Provider.

== Services and products ==
Carbon Clear offers sustainability services including energy management, carbon footprint services, strategy and target setting and climate change risks and opportunities analysis. It develops its own carbon offset projects.

The company also offers consultancy services for organisations that must comply with legislation including the UK Government's CRC Energy Efficiency Legislation, the Energy Savings Opportunity Scheme, Mandatory Greenhouse Gas Reporting and the EU Emissions Trading Scheme.

== See also ==
- Carbon neutrality
- Climate change
- Carbon offsets
- Carbon footprint
