= Myclimate =

myclimate
- Founded: 2002
- Type: nonprofit climate protection organisation
- Location: Zürich
- Website: www.myclimate.org

myclimate was spun off from the Swiss Federal Institute of Technology Zurich in 2002 as a nonprofit climate protection organisation based in Switzerland to enable climate protection with economic mechanisms such as price-tagging carbon dioxide and integrating the externality into the market. They promote climate protection on three levels: avoidance techniques such as capacity building and teaching, reduction (which includes energy efficiency, renewable energy and management methods) and carbon offsetting. myclimate advocates for the development of a carbon market while setting new standards in carbon emissions and in designing a sustainable society.

== The 3 pillars ==
=== Avoid ===
myclimate promotes the gathering of knowledge about CO_{2} reduction, raises awareness and inspires long-term climate protection. To achieve these goals, myclimate works with schools, institutions and businesses, organises exhibitions, contests, designs schoolbooks and games. In 2008 the climate protection game TriCO_{2}lor was awarded by the UNESCO.

=== Reduce ===
myclimate provides carbon assessment services, as well as more comprehensive life cycle assessments. In 2008, together with the Swiss ecological centre of Langenbruck, the association Climatop was founded which awards climate-positive products. The initiative thereby hopes to increase competition among producers and to encourage the development of better products and promote ecodesign. The label is, among others, used by the biggest retailer in Switzerland, Migros.

In addition, businesses are provided a range of tools for the development of strategies, the analysis of products and the optimisation of existing processes. Furthermore, myclimate designs carbon neutral products, for example climate neutral printing.

=== Offset ===
myclimate develops its own projects according to the CDM Gold Standard. This most stringent standard for carbon offsetting projects was developed by 21 NGOs, including the World Wide Fund for Nature. The Standard is supported by 60 NGOs worldwide. The Golden Standard is the only standard which certifies projects' sustainable development factors, e.g. co-benefit criteria like healthcare, job creation or reforestation.

== Characteristic traits ==
In comparison to other climate protection companies working in the carbon market, myclimate has several unique characteristics:

- it is a charity foundation
- it operates within the "voluntary" carbon market (i.e., carbon offset is realized in addition to the Kyoto Protocol targets)
- it generates "sustainability" carbon certificates in self-developed carbon offsetting projects (i.e., it does not trade carbon certificates).

== Partners and Patronage ==
The original idea for myclimate comes from former students of the Swiss Federal Institute of Technology Zurich (ETH Zurich) and is academically supported by different institutes in the university, such as the ETH Centre for Sustainability, as well as the Swiss Federal Office for Energy. Its patrons include, among others, the Swiss Minister of the Environment Doris Leuthard and the former member of the German Bundestag Prof. Ernst Ulrich von Weizsäcker. The government of Liechtenstein, UNEP Global Civil Society Forum, the Swiss federal office for environmental protection or the Swiss WWF Climate Group compensate their emissions with myclimate.

== Market Insecurities ==
There is some controversy around the topic of emission reduction through carbon offset. There are several insecurities within the three trading markets under the so-called Kyoto flexible mechanisms (see also Carbon market mechanism), e.g. most standards lack of a proper quality assurance scheme which can lead to double counting or lacking Additionality. According to myclimate the CDM Gold Standard was developed to avoid these insecurities.

== Studies ==
In 2006 the climate department of Tufts University in the United States examined 13 organisations that offer compensations for CO_{2} emissions. Criteria were transparency, exactness of the calculations, price of the certificates and administrative costs. myclimate was one of four suppliers who reached the mark "excellent". The ENDS guide also lists myclimate in its top three carbon offsetters.

== Criticism ==
In 2022, journalists from the weekly newspaper Die Zeit had a non-existent flower store certified by Myclimate. The information provided was not verified by Myclimate. Only a fraction of the costs charged were to flow into a project to offset the unaudited CO_{2} emissions of the fictitious company.
