= International Carbon Reduction and Offset Alliance =

The International Carbon Reduction and Offset Alliance (ICROA)
- Formation: 2008
- Purpose: Industry trade group
- Members: Worldwide
- Website: http://www.icroa.org/

The International Carbon Reduction and Offset Alliance (ICROA) is an industry trade group for providers of voluntary carbon offsets. It was established in 2008, and aims to promote industry self-regulation based on its ICROA Code of Best Practices. Members produce an annual report demonstrating compliance with the ICROA Code.

== History ==
ICROA was launched by eight carbon offset providers on June 9, 2008. Along with the initial eight, ICROA has been open to new members which meet its membership criteria, and this was reflected in their early announcement that they intended to increase fourfold over the following twelve months. Nevertheless, the co-chairman of the organization, Jonathan Shopley, stated in 2008 that most offset providers would not be qualified to join.

With ICROA headquartered in the United Kingdom, the eight founding members consisted of five British firms (Carbon Clear, The Carbon Neutral Company, ClimateCare, CO2balance and Targetneutral), two from the United States (Native Energy and TerraPass), and one from Australia (Climate Friendly). Current membership is eleven companies worldwide.

== Criticism ==
In February 2009, ICROA criticised the UK Government quality assurance scheme for carbon offsets as it did not include voluntary emissions cuts (VERS). In a statement a spokesman said, "Unfortunately, it still fails to recognise VERs and we feel very strongly there's no reason for this." In turn ICROA was criticised by Dr Bruce Elliott, managing director of carbon offset company Clear which had achieved accreditation under the government scheme. Elliot stated that, "The trade body which represents offset organisations who sell VERs, ICROA, have unsurprisingly been vociferous in their criticism of the scheme. Many of its members have substantial investments in VER projects which now face an uncertain future without the government’s backing. This financial conflict of interest is readily apparent in their persistent public criticism of a scheme which matches or sets higher standards than its own code of conduct for the majority of criteria."

== See also ==
- Carbon emission trading
- Contraction and Convergence
