= South Pole (company) =

Swiss carbon finance consultancy

- Type: Private
- Industry: Environmental
- Founded: 2006
- Founder: Patrick Bürgi, Thomas Camerata, Renat Heuberger, Ingo Puhl, Christoph Sutter, Christoph Grobbel, Marco Hirsbrunner, Christian Dannecker
- Headquarters: Zurich, Switzerland
- Number of locations: 23
- Area served: Worldwide
- Key people: Nadia Kaddouri (CEO); Inga Beale (Chairwoman)
- Products: Carbon Offset and Renewable Energy Certificates, Corporate Climate Risks & Opportunities, Land Use and Water, Supply Chain Advisory, Renewable Energy Solutions, Climate Policy, Public Advisory, Climate-Smart Cities, Digital Lab, Sustainability Marketing, Green Finance, Fund Advisory
- Owner: 92% employee owned
- Number of employees: 700
- Website: www.southpole.com

South Pole is a Swiss carbon finance consultancy, founded in 2006 in Zurich, Switzerland. The firm provides services in project and technology finance, data and advisory on sustainability risks, as well as the development of environmental commodities, such as carbon and renewable energy credits.

== History ==
South Pole was founded in 2006 by graduates of the Swiss Federal Institute of Technology (ETH) including Patrick Bürgi, Thomas Camerata, Renat Heuberger, Ingo Puhl, and Christoph Sutter, and joined by Christoph Grobbel, Marco Hirsbrunner, and Christian Dannecker as equal partners. The company originally started as a spin-off from the ETH Zurich as the non-profit ‘myclimate.’

Following the success of myclimate, the founders decided to position climate change as a business opportunity, and ‘South Pole Carbon’ was born. The company rebranded to ‘South Pole Group’ in 2015, and then again to the current ‘South Pole’ in January 2018.

In 2012, South Pole acquired a major stake in Australian carbon farming project developer and offset retailer, Sydney-based Climate Friendly. In 2017, the company acquired Climate Friendly's domestic and international carbon and renewables division outright, which at that point was a majority-owned subsidiary of the South Pole. In 2019, South Pole sold its majority share in Climate Friendly back to the Australian subsidiary's management team.

By 2019, South Pole claimed to have reduced or removed over 170 million tonnes of CO_{2}.

South Pole consecutively won awards, as part of Environmental Finance's Annual Voluntary Carbon Market Rankings, from 2018 to 2021.

In 2021, a 10% stake in the South Pole was bought by Lightrock, a leading global impact investor backed by LGT and the Princely House of Liechtenstein. The investment was reported to be in the range of “€20 million-plus.” Also in 2021, South Pole acquired Belgium-based climate consultancy CO2logic to expand its offerings in Belgium and France. This was followed in 2022 by the acquisition of Italy-based Carbonsink, with offices in Milan, Florence, and Maputo.

== Projects ==
South Pole has developed more than 1000 projects in over 50 countries, including reforestation and forest protection, renewable energy, habitat restoration, clean cookstoves, and other project types.

South Pole has provided services or provided offsets to major companies including Nestlé, Gucci, EY, Hilton, and ALDO Group.

== Controversy ==
In 2023, doubt was cast over the integrity of the South Pole main project in Kariba, Zimbabwe by several media reports, who questioned whether the large quantities of carbon credits generated by the project were backed by real emission reduction. On the 27th October 2023, South Pole cut all ties with the project, confirming that the project had failed to meet standards.
