= ISO 14064 =

Greenhouse gas emissions standard

The ISO 14064 standard (initially published in 2006 and updated in 2018) is the core part of the ISO 14060 family of standards that are part of the ISO 14000 series of international standards by the International Organization for Standardization (ISO) for environmental management. The ISO 14064 standards provides governments, businesses, regions and other organisations with a complementary set of tools for programs to quantify, monitor, report and verify greenhouse gas emissions. The ISO 14064 standards supports organisations to participate in both regulated and voluntary programs such as emissions trading schemes and public reporting using a globally recognised standard.

== Structure of Standard ==
The Standard has three parts:

- ISO 14064-1:2018 specifies principles and requirements at the organization level for quantification and reporting of greenhouse gas (GHG) emissions and removals. It includes requirements for the design, development, management, reporting and verification of an organization's GHG inventory.
- ISO 14064-2:2019 specifies principles and requirements and provides guidance at the project level.
- ISO 14064-3:2019 specifies principles and requirements and provides guidance for those conducting or managing the validation and/or verification of greenhouse gas (GHG) assertions. It can be applied to organizational or GHG project quantification, including GHG quantification, monitoring and reporting carried out in accordance with ISO 14064-1 or ISO 14064-2.

== Uses ==
ISO 14064-3 specifies requirements for selecting GHG validators/verifiers, establishing the level of assurance, objectives, criteria and scope, determining the validation/verification approach, assessing GHG data, information, information systems and controls, evaluating GHG assertions and preparing validation/verification statements.

The ISO 14064-3 verification standard is one of the standards accepted by the Carbon Disclosure Project, the widely used climate impact disclosure system, as a valid framework for measuring and reporting GHG emissions.

The principles behind ISO 14064 have been used in national calculation methodologies such as the UK's Carbon Trust Standard.

== History ==
The standards were updated in 2018 from their initial versions published in 2006. They incorporate work that was carried out by BSI through its Publicly Available Specifications BSI PAS 2060 Carbon Neutrality and BSI PAS 2050 Product Carbon Footprints.
