= African carbon market =

Carbon market in Africa

The African carbon market is a platform that seeks to integrate climate change mitigation with poverty alleviation for local-level farmers in Africa. Agricultural carbon market participants look forward to receiving credits for avoiding greenhouse gas emissions. The carbon market grants monetary benefits to farmers.

== Description ==
Carbon markets are carbon pricing mechanisms enabling governments and non-state actors to trade greenhouse gas emission credits. The aims are to achieve climate targets and implement climate action costs effectively. There are compliance carbon markets and voluntary carbon markets. The carbon market allows for the trading of carbon credits generated by projects in various countries to reduce greenhouse gas emissions or carbon sequestration projects.

There are several controversies and discourses surrounding the African carbon market, and carbon markets as a whole concerning the efficacy of the projects and systems that attempt to alleviate poverty and mitigate the effects of carbon emissions and the fundamental power structures that come with corporate influence over the carbon cycling capacity of the environment and developing communities and countries in which carbon markets are located.

== Background ==
The African carbon market is one of the many carbon credit trading markets established since the Kyoto Protocol in 1997.

Microsoft and the Wildlife Conservation Society (WCS) participated in the first government-backed sale of carbon credits in Africa with the Government of Madagascar in 2014.

There is also the West African Alliance For Carbon Market constituting Gambia, Burkina-Faso, Benin, Ghana, Guinea-Bissau, Mauritania, Liberia, Sierra Leone, Niger, Senegal, Ivory Coast, Togo, and Cape Verde.

== Purpose and implementation ==
In some cases carbon credit projects are done directly with small-scale farmers, and in other cases large parcels of land are leased to a government or corporation for processes like reforestation or afforestation. For example, Green Resources Ltd (GRL) is one owner of a long term lease from the Tanzanian government in order to reforest certain areas. Practices that receive carbon credits include mainly: implementation of sustainable energy practices, soil carbon management, implementation of crop rotation agriculture, reforestation, and afforestation. In a 2013 study of 78 voluntary market-based projects, located in 23 countries in Africa, 42% of projects were energy efficiency projects, 40% afforestation/reforestation, 7% solar projects, 4% biomass energy projects, and the remaining percent makes up smaller types of projects (such as hydro and wind).

The program evolved in the 2000s to divide into two systems: compliance and voluntary markets. These markets diverge when it comes to regulation structures. The Voluntary Carbon Market (VCM) is less formalized, and not addressed by the Clean Development Mechanism (CDM). These make up the projects mediated by private, non-state entities. The compliance market, governed by the CDM, is much more formal and hierarchical, with these being the projects mediated by national and international institutions.

In a 2013 study of 78 voluntary market-based projects, located in 23 countries in Africa, of the project developers 59% were private international businesses, 28% were international non-profit organizations, 9% were private local businesses, and 4% were local non-profit organizations.

In 2011, voluntary carbon markets brought $60 million to Africa, with that increasing to $66 million in 2012.

== Controversy and discourse ==
There has been much discussion about the effectiveness of carbon financing as a whole, and controversy around such topics. The case of Africa is unique from the rest in the way that there is relatively little experience, but when combined with extensive evidence from across the global south, Africa plays an important part in the discussion of carbon markets as a whole.

The root of the criticisms of carbon markets as a whole, is in that privatization of the Earth's carbon cycling capacity has been based in political and economic processes including neoliberalism of the environment, increasing financialization, and the ongoing governance configurations across key institutions and nation states. This is then used to argue that carbon financing as a whole is used to protect the interests of the fossil fuel-dependent industrial complex. Essentially, critics of carbon markets assert that the whole system is used to avoid responding to the need for low-carbon infrastructure and to perpetuate the current economic relations or 'business as usual'.

The efficacy of carbon pricing in general has been evaluated in a study of global carbon pricing emissions reductions from 1990 to 2021. Compiling more than 37 studies on the efficacy on carbon pricing, the data indicated that the emissions reductions from this method maintained in the range of 0% and 2% per year globally. For comparison, the IPCC states that emissions must fall by 45% by 2030 in order to reach the limit set as a goal during the Intergovernmental Panel on Climate Change in 2018 (known as the Paris Agreement).

There have also been concerns expressed about whether afforestation, reforestation, and carbon soil sequestration projects are being assessed at the proper level or carbon emission reductions, or whether this process is as effective at storing or reducing carbon as it is supposed to be. Scientists currently cannot evaluate exactly how much carbon is stored or released in these processes, and concerns about the payout of carbon credits for these uncertain processes exist among climate scientists.
