= Cheyne Capital Management =

UK alternative asset manager

Cheyne Capital Management (UK) LLP.
- Industry: Finance
- Founded: 2000
- Headquarters: London, UK
- Key people: Jonathan Lourie (CEO); Stuart Fiertz (President)
- AUM: US$ 15 billion (as of 31 July 2026)
- Number of employees: 180
- Website: www.cheynecapital.com

Cheyne Capital was founded in 2000 by Jonathan Lourie (CEO & CIO) and Stuart Fiertz (President). Cheyne is a leading Alternative investment fund manager investing across the capital structure, focusing primarily on corporate and real estate assets.

The Cheyne group currently employs approximately 180 people in its 11 offices world-wide.

The firm's co-founder, Stuart Fiertz, was a member of the 14-person Hedge Fund Working Group, which devised best practice policies regarding financial valuation, transparency, and risk management. Those guidelines evolved into what is now the Standards Board for Alternative Investments, a self-regulatory body of which Cheyne is a member. It is also a member of the Alternative Investment Management Association (AIMA), the global representative of the alternative investment industry. In April 2014, Stuart Fiertz was appointed as a Director of the AIMA Global Council and is Chair of AIMA's Alternative Credit Council, a committee of alternative asset management firms which are financing the real economy.

== History ==
Cheyne Capital was founded in 2000 by Jonathan Lourie and Stuart Fiertz who are currently the CEO and President of Cheyne Capital Management (UK) LLP respectively. At its launch, it was authorised and regulated by the U.K. Financial Services Authority (FSA).

Cheyne Capital Management (UK) LLP is authorised and regulated by the Financial Conduct Authority (FCA) and is an Alternative Investment Fund Manager (AIFM). The firm is also registered in the United States with the Securities Exchange Commission (SEC) as an Investment Adviser. Cheyne was one of the initial signatories to the Standards Board for Alternative Investments and is a signatory to the United Nations-supported Principles for Responsible Investment (PRI).
