= Winrock International =

Nonprofit organization based in Arkansas, US

Winrock International Institute For Agricultural Development
- Formation: Tax-exempt since March 1985; 41 years ago
- Type: 501(c)(3)
- Headquarters: North Little Rock
- Revenue: 118,534,035 USD (2023)
- Expenses: 118,970,595 USD (2023)
- Endowment: 83,643,840 USD (2023)
- Website: winrock.org

Winrock International is a nonprofit organization whose stated mission is to increase economic opportunity, sustain natural resources, and protect the environment. Based in Little Rock, Arkansas, and Washington, D.C., Winrock is named for Winthrop Rockefeller, who served as the 37th governor of Arkansas.

== History ==
In 1953, Winthrop Rockefeller founded Winrock Enterprises and Winrock Farms in Morrilton, Arkansas. Winrock Farms served as a model facility to test and demonstrate agricultural practices that other farmers could emulate.

After his death, Rockefeller's trustees created the Winrock International Livestock Research and Training Center. In 1985, the center merged with two other Rockefeller organizations—the Agricultural Development Council (founded by John D. Rockefeller III) and the International Agricultural Development Service (founded by the Rockefeller Foundation). The newly merged organization became known as Winrock International.

== Initiatives ==
Winrock's projects are focused on four main areas: agriculture, economic development, energy and environment, and human and social capital. More than 95% of the organization's funding comes from the U.S. government, primarily the U.S. Agency for International Development (USAID).

Winrock initiatives include:

- The American Carbon Registry, the first private, voluntary greenhouse-gas registry.
- The Arkansas Regional Innovation Hub, a makerspace that provides facilities, technology, support and equipment for entrepreneurs, artists and makers.
- Farmer-to-Farmer, a USAID-funded program that sends American agricultural experts to the developing world to provide technical assistance to farmers, agribusinesses, and other groups involved with food production.
- Innovate Arkansas, a project funded by the Arkansas Economic Development Commission that helps the state's technology entrepreneurs move from the startup phase to commercial viability.
- Wallace Center, which was founded in 1983 as the Institute for Alternative Agriculture. Today, the Wallace Center (now named for former Secretary of Agriculture, Henry A. Wallace) brings together diverse people and ideas to co-create solutions that build healthy farms, equitable economies, and resilient food systems. The organization strives to remain a power-shifting intermediary, stepping in where there’s an invitation to serve, and urging others toward a more diverse and connected food system where sustainable farming is vibrant and thriving.

In 1995, Winrock's Forestry and Natural Resource Management Program absorbed the Nitrogen Fixing Tree Association (NFTA), formed in 1981, and renamed it the Forest, Farm, and Community Tree Network (FACT Net) in 1996; though FACT Net ceased operation at the end of 1999, all material is maintained online by the Forestry and Natural Resource Management Program, including clarifications and errata of FACT sheets issued prior to closing of FACT Net.
