= Gold Standard (carbon offset standard) =

Standard and logo certification mark program

The Gold Standard logo

The Gold Standard (GS), or Gold Standard for the Global Goals, is a standard and logo certification mark program, for non-governmental emission reductions projects in the Clean Development Mechanism (CDM), the voluntary carbon market and other climate and development interventions. It is published and administered by the Gold Standard Foundation, a non-profit foundation headquartered in Geneva, Switzerland. It was designed with an intent to ensure that carbon credits are real, verifiable, and that projects make measurable contributions to sustainable development. The objective of the GS is to add branding, with a quality label, to carbon credits generated by projects which can then be bought and traded by countries that have a binding legal commitment according to the Kyoto Protocol, businesses, or other organizations for carbon offsetting purposes. The Integrity Council for the Voluntary Carbon Market lists Gold Standard as a "CCP-Eligible" program under the Core Carbon Principles benchmark.

== History ==
The Gold Standard for CDM (GS-CER) was developed in 2003 by World Wide Fund for Nature (WWF), South-North, and Helio International. The Voluntary Gold Standard (GS-VER), a standard for use within the voluntary carbon market, was launched in May 2006. The programs were created following a 12-month consultation period that included workshops and web-based consultation conducted by an independent standard advisory board composed of non-governmental organizations (NGOs), scientists, project developers and government representatives.

As of October 2018, more than 80 non-profit organizations internationally had officially endorsed the Gold Standard program.

The program is administered by the Gold Standard Foundation, a non-profit foundation under Swiss law that is headquartered in Geneva, Switzerland. It also employs local experts in Brazil, India, and South Africa.

In July 2008, the Gold Standard Version 2.0 was released, including sets of guidelines and manuals on the GS requirements, toolkits, and other supporting documents to be used by project developers and DOEs. This relegated the previously applicable manuals to Version 1.0. The Version 2.0 also supports Program of Activities (PoA).

In July 2017, a new version called the Gold Standard for the Global Goals was released, superseding the previous Gold Standards.

In June 2024 Gold Standard released a Public Carbon Regulations tracker, commissioned by South Pole to increase visibility on regulations across continents for project developers.

== Scholarly recognition and criticisms ==
The Gold Standard is recognized by carbon market and scholars of carbon markets and climate change politics scholars as a prime example of voluntary standards. As a program certifying emissions trading programs, criticisms of the general practice of emissions trading may also generally apply to the Gold Standard certification program.

== Eligibility ==
To be eligible for Gold Standard Certification, a project must:

1. Be a Gold Standard-approved Renewable Energy Supply or End use Energy Efficiency, Afforestation/Reforestation or Agriculture project type
2. Be reducing one of the three eligible Greenhouse Gases: Carbon Dioxide (CO_{2}), Methane (CH_{4}) and Nitrous Oxide (N_{2}O)
3. Not employ Official Development Assistance (ODA) under the condition that the credits coming out of the project are transferred to the donor country
4. Not be applying for other certifications, to ensure there is no double counting of credits
5. Demonstrate its additionality by using the United Nations Framework Convention on Climate Change's (UNFCCC) Large Scale Additionality Tool; and show that the project is not a 'business-as-usual' scenario
6. Make a net-positive contribution to the economic as well as the environmental and social welfare of the local population that hosts it, in the form of contributions to a minimum of three Sustainable Development Goals (SDGs)

== The Gold Standard Registry ==
Status of projects that apply for Gold Standard can be tracked on its registry. Project Developers, Designated Operational Entities (DOEs) (also known as Validators), Traders and Buyers of credits can open accounts with the registry. There are various publicly available reports.

== See also ==
- Climate, Community & Biodiversity Alliance
- Verified Carbon Standard
