= Swiss Federal Institute of Technology =

The Swiss Federal Institutes of Technology are two institutes of higher education in Switzerland (part of the ETH Domain):

- Swiss Federal Institute of Technology in Lausanne (EPFL)
- Swiss Federal Institute of Technology in Zürich (ETHZ)
