= Verified Carbon Standard =

Standard for certifying carbon emissions reductions

Verra
- Formation: 2005
- Type: Nonprofit 501(c)(3)
- Purpose: A carbon accounting standard and organisation.
- Headquarters: Washington, D.C.
- CEO: Mandy Rambharos
- Website: https://verra.org/

The Verified Carbon Standard (VCS), formerly the Voluntary Carbon Standard, is a standard for certifying carbon credits to offset emissions. VCS is administered by Verra, a certifier of voluntary carbon offsets. As of 2024, more than 2,300 projects were registered under the Verified Carbon Standard (VCS), spanning various sectors such as AFOLU (Agriculture, Forestry, and Other Land Use), energy, transport, waste, manufacturing industries, and others. These projects have collectively issued over 1.3 billion credits, with more than 776 million credits retired to date.

There are also specific methodologies for REDD+ projects. Verra is a program of choice for most of the forest credits in the voluntary market, and almost all REDD+ projects. The Integrity Council for the Voluntary Carbon Market lists Verra's Verified Carbon Standard (VCS) as a "CCP-Eligible" program under the Core Carbon Principles benchmark.

Verra was developed in 2005 when the company Climate Wedge and its partner Cheyne Capital designed and drafted the first version (version 1.0) of the Voluntary Carbon Standard. This standard was intended as a quality standard for transacting and developing "non-Kyoto" Protocol carbon credits. Climate Wedge was at the time active as a carbon markets investment advisory firm.

There are controversies around this standard and how it is implemented. In 2023, an investigation by The Guardian, Die Zeit, and SourceMaterial (a non-profit investigative journalism outlet) found that about 94% of the rainforest carbon offsets certified by Verra are worthless. The investigation even found that the standard may in fact worsen climate change: "Investigation into Verra carbon standard finds most are ‘phantom credits’ and may worsen global heating". In May 2023, following months of criticism towards Verra in its handling of carbon-offsetting, CEO David Antonioli resigned.

In June 2024, three carbon credit projects were suspended in the Brazilian Amazon after the police raids targeting Verra certified projects linked to a land-grabbing and illegal logging scam.

== Usage in voluntary carbon markets ==
Verra was developed in 2005. It is a widely used voluntary carbon standard, which also offers specific methodologies for REDD+ projects. As of 2020, there had been over 1,500 certified VCS projects covering energy, transport, waste, forestry, and other sectors. In 2021, Verra issued 300 MtCO_{2}e worth of offset credits for 110 projects. Verra is the program of choice for most of the forest credits in the voluntary market, and almost all REDD+ projects.

== Development ==
In 2005, carbon markets investment advisory firm Climate Wedge and its partner Cheyne Capital designed and drafted the first version (version 1.0) of the Voluntary Carbon Standard, intended as a quality standard for transacting and developing "non-Kyoto" Protocol carbon credits. Those were voluntary carbon emissions reductions from greenhouse gas reduction projects that met the quality and verification standards of the UNFCCC Kyoto Protocol's Clean Development Mechanism (CDM) carbon offset mechanism, but were not eligible, as the CDM only allows emission-reduction projects in developing countries to earn certified emission reduction (CER) credits.

In March 2006, Climate Wedge and Cheyne Capital transferred the Voluntary Carbon Standard version 1.0 to The Climate Group, International Emissions Trading Association (IETA) and World Economic Forum. They also provided the initial sponsor capital for these non-profit organizations to subsequently convene a team of global carbon market experts to further draft the VCS requirements. The World Business Council for Sustainable Development (WBCSD) joined later on. The team later formed the VCS Steering Committee, which worked to draft the second and subsequent versions of the VCS Standard.

In 2008, the Board of Directors named David Antonioli the organization's first chief executive officer. In 2009, VCS incorporated in Washington D.C. as a non-profit non-governmental organization.

On February 15, 2018, the organization that maintains the Verified Carbon Standard changed its name from Verified Carbon Standard (VCS) to Verra. The new name was chosen to suggest "‘verification’ and ‘terra’, and reflects the fundamental nature of our work".

In May 2023, following months of criticism towards Verra in its handling of carbon-offsetting, CEO David Antonioli resigned.

== Controversies ==
A 2021 study by The Guardian newspaper and Unearthed reported that Verra's carbon offsetting standard was flawed. Accredited forest protection projects were using inconsistent predictive methods and overstating their emissions reductions. 11 of the 12 projects studied showed no difference in emissions compared to control groups. The study said the findings raised doubts about the validity of the carbon offsetting market.

A nine-month investigation published on January 18, 2023, by The Guardian, Die Zeit, and SourceMaterial, a non-profit investigative journalism organization, found that approximately 94% of the rainforest carbon credits certified by Verra – which accounted for about 40% of all credits it approved – do not represent a tonne of carbon dioxide equivalent. They also found that the credit scheme may worsen global heating and that the deforestation threat for Verra projects was overstated by 400% on average. At one of Verra's project sites in Peru, residents complained about being forcefully evicted from their homes, which were then demolished. The investigation was based on one peer-reviewed study by a group of University of Cambridge scientists, and another from a team of international researchers that at the time of the Guardian publication was not published or peer-reviewed.

In 2024, a Channel 4 documentary highlighted these concerns alongside claims from Human Rights Watch that it was investigating a Verra carbon reduction project where Indigenous Cambodians lived in fear of homes and farmland being destroyed by armed rangers.

In May 2024, an investigation report by Brazilian news outlet Mongbay discovered that two carbon credit projects certified by Verra in the Brazilian Amazon has found that they may be connected to illegal timber laundering. Following the report, Brazilian police raided the three carbon credit projects belonging to Ricardo Stoppe, Brazil's top individual seller of carbon credits. Clientele of the projects include major corporations such as GOL Airlines, Nestlé, Toshiba, Spotify, Boeing, and PwC.

=== Concerns with forestry projects ===
Forestry projects have faced increasing criticism over their integrity as offset or credit programs. A number of news stories from 2021 to 2023 criticized nature-based carbon offsets, the REDD+ program, and certification organizations. In one case it was estimated that around 90% of rainforest offset credits of the Verified Carbon Standard are likely to be "phantom credits".

Tree planting projects in particular have been problematic. Critics point to a number of concerns. Trees reach maturity over a course of many decades. It is difficult to guarantee how long the forest will last. It may suffer clearing, burning, or mismanagement. Some tree-planting projects introduce fast-growing invasive species. These end up damaging native forests and reducing biodiversity. In response, some certification standards such as the Climate Community and Biodiversity Standard require multiple species plantings. Tree planting in high latitude forests may have a net warming effect on the Earth's climate because tree cover absorbs sunlight thus creating a warming effect that balances out their absorption of carbon dioxide. Tree-planting projects can also cause conflicts with local communities and Indigenous people if the project displaces or otherwise curtails their use of forest resources.

== See also ==
- Architecture for REDD+ Transactions
- Climate, Community & Biodiversity Alliance – Partnership in land management activities
- Carbon accounting – Processes used to measure emissions of carbon dioxide equivalents
- Carbon dioxide removal – Removal of atmospheric carbon dioxide through human activity
