= Carbon offsets and credits =

Carbon dioxide reduction scheme

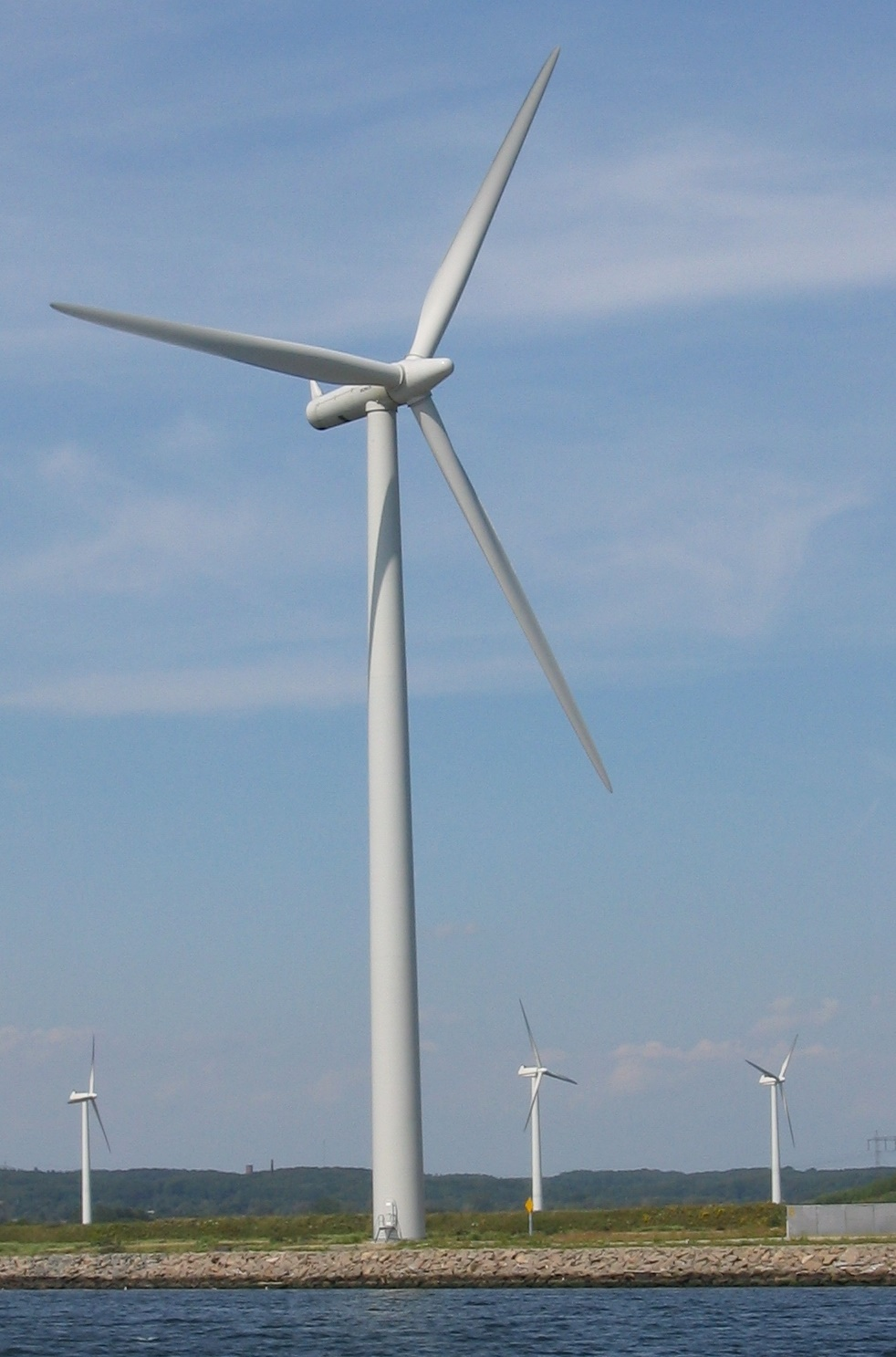
Renewable energy projects, such as these wind turbines near Aalborg, Denmark, constitute one common type of carbon offset project.

A carbon credit is a tradable instrument (typically a virtual certificate) that conveys a claim to have avoided greenhouse gas (GHG) emissions or to have enhanced removal of GHG from the atmosphere. One carbon credit represents the avoided or enhanced removal of one metric ton of carbon dioxide or its carbon dioxide-equivalent (CO_{2}e).

Carbon offsetting is the practice of using carbon credits to offset or counter an entity's greenhouse gas inventory emissions in line with reporting programs or institutional emissions targets/goals. Carbon credit trading mechanisms (i.e., crediting programs), enable project developers to implement projects that mitigate GHGs and receive carbon credits which can be sold to interested buyers who may use the credits to claim they have offset their inventory GHG emissions. Similar to "offsetting", carbon credits that are permitted as compliance instruments within regulatory compliance markets (e.g., The European Union Emission Trading Scheme or the California Cap-n-Trade program) can be used by regulated entities to report lower emissions and achieve compliance status (with limitations around their use that vary by compliance program). Aside from "offsetting", carbon credits can also be used to make contributions toward global net zero GHG-level targets. It is an individual buyer's choice how to use, or "retire", the carbon credit.

Projects entail mitigation actions that avoid or enhance the removal of GHG emissions. Projects are implemented in line with the standards of crediting programs, including their methodologies, rules, and requirements. Methodologies are approved for each specific project type (e.g., tree planting, mangrove restoration, early retirement of coal powerplants). Provided a project fulfills all of the requirements and provisions of a crediting program, it will be issued credits that can be sold to buyers. Each crediting program typically has its own carbon credit 'label' such as CDM's Certified Emission Reductions (CERs), Article 6.4 Mechanism Emission Reductions (A6.4ERs), VCS' Verified Emission Reductions (VERs), ACR's Emission Reduction Tonnes, Climate Action Reserves' Climate Reserve Tonnes (CRTs), etc.

Hundreds of GHG mitigation project types exist and have approved methodologies with established crediting programs. But each crediting program has its own list of approved methodologies, for example unless explicitly stated, an ACR approved methodology could not be used by someone trying to work through Verra's Verified Carbon Standard. Carbon credits are a form of carbon pricing, along with carbon taxes, and Carbon Border Adjustment Mechanisms (CBAM). Carbon credits are intended to be fungible across different markets, but some compliance markets and reporting programs limit eligibility to specified carbon credit types or characteristics (e.g., vintage, project origin, project type).

== Credit quality ==
"The originating idea behind a carbon credit is that it can substitute for reductions that a buyer could have made to their own emissions (i.e., compensation use). For this to be true, the world must be at least as well off when a carbon credit is used as it would have been if the buyer had reduced their own carbon footprint. The "quality" of a carbon credit refers to the level of confidence that the use of the credit will fulfill this basic principle." Carbon credits and crediting programs have come under increased scrutiny following the rigorous assessment of credit quality and many investigative journalism articles, which have identified significant quality, or environmental integrity, concerns related to credit's avoided emissions or enhanced removals claims. The Australia Institute highlights 23 instances where carbon crediting programs were found to have significant shortcomings. These include claims of overestimated carbon sequestration, double-counting of credits, and the failure of projects to provide "additional" environmental benefits beyond what would have occurred in the absence of the project. Many enhanced removal projects have received criticism as greenwashing because they overstated their ability to sequester carbon, with some projects being shown to actually increase overall emissions.

The essential elements of carbon credit quality can be distilled to five criteria. Higher-quality carbon credits are those associated with avoided emissions or enhanced removals that are:

- Additional
- Robustly quantified
- Permanent
- Not claimed by another entity
- Not associated with significant social or environmental harms

Carbon credit quality is possible to assess and in response to the growing concerns related to credit quality, many credit ratings initiatives began to form around 2020 to aid buyers and crediting programs in discerning high-quality from low-quality projects and to make improvements to crediting methodologies so that future credits will only be issued if they meet more rigorous requirements. These credit ratings initiatives have taken the form of open access resources like OffsetGuide.org, labeling initiatives like the Integrity Council for the Voluntary Carbon Market that works to assess methodologies and determine if they meet the threshold of quality (determined by applying an assessment framework) to receive the Core Carbon Principle (CCP) label or not, or the Carbon Credit Quality Initiative which conducts deep analysis (an exhaustive assessment framework) and assigns a score of 1-5 representing the holistic quality of a methodology. For profit credit ratings companies have also sprung up that provide quality ratings for individual projects by reviewing their project documents.

== The Paris Agreement crediting mechanism ==
Through international climate negotiations led by the UNFCCC, the Paris Agreement was agreed to in 2015 and included provisions for carbon crediting to be a mechanism that could be used to aid countries in meeting their Nationally Determined Contributions (NDCs). At COP27, negotiators agreed to define credits issued under Article 6 of the Paris Agreement as "mitigation contributions" toward a country's NDC fulfillment. Article 6 of the Paris Agreement includes three mechanisms for "voluntary cooperation" between countries toward climate goals, including carbon credit markets. Article 6.2 enabled countries to directly trade carbon credits through the development of bilateral crediting mechanisms (i.e., bilateral crediting programs). Article 6.4 established a new international crediting program that supplants the CDM program. The third option is Article 6.8, which enables non-credit generating cooperation (and is not relevant to this article). These provisions allow for mechanisms (excluding Article 6.8) to be developed to enable carbon credits to aid countries in meeting their Nationally Determined Contributions (NDC) commitments to achieve the goals of the Paris Agreement. Article 6.4, also referred to as the Paris Agreement Crediting Mechanism (PACM), and is supplanting the CDM but seeks to respond to quality concerns raised by researchers and the media by enhancing the quality of credits and raise the standard of rigor for the entire market. CDM projects may transition to become PACM projects if they meet the eligibility requirements and the Article 6.4 Methodology Panel is reviewing CDM (and other submitted methodologies) to determine if they meet the more rigorous standards of the PACM standard documents to be adopted by PACM to guide project development.

== Project types ==
Some include forestry projects that avoid logging and plant saplings, renewable energy projects such as wind farms, biomass energy, biogas digesters, hydroelectric dams, as well as energy efficiency projects. Further projects include carbon dioxide removal projects, carbon capture and storage projects, and the elimination of methane emissions in various settings such as landfills.

== Common terms ==
Forward crediting, is typically regarded as a risky practice that leads to lower-quality credits. Forward crediting is a process where credits are issued for projected avoided emissions or enhanced removals, which can be claimed by buyers even before the reduction activities have occurred.

The vintage of a carbon credit is the year in which a carbon credit was issued by a crediting program, which usually corresponds to the year in which a third party auditor reviews the project — generates the carbon offset credit is known as the vintage.

A registry is a core function of a carbon crediting program. Through a typically publicly accessible registry, carbon credits are tracked for their ownership and retirement. Registries may contain project information such as project status, project documents, credits generated, ownership, sale, and retirement.

== History ==
In 1977, major amendments to the US Clean Air Act created one of the first tradable emission offset mechanisms, allowing permitted facilities to increase emissions in exchange for paying another company to reduce its emissions of the same pollutant by a greater amount. The 1990 amendments to that same law established the Acid Rain Trading Program, which introduced the concept of a cap and trade system, which allowed companies to buy and sell offsets created by other companies that invested in emission reduction projects subject to an overall limit on emissions. In the 1990s, regulatory frameworks for the US Clean Water Act enabled mitigation banking and wetlands offsetting, which set the procedural and conceptual precedent for carbon offsetting.

In 1997, the original international compliance carbon markets emerged from the Kyoto Protocol, which established three mechanisms that enable countries or operators in developed countries to acquire offset credits. One mechanism was the Clean Development Mechanism (CDM), which expanded the concept of carbon emissions trading to a global scale, focusing on the major greenhouse gases that cause climate change: carbon dioxide (CO_{2}), methane, nitrous oxide (N_{2}O), perfluorocarbons, hydrofluorocarbons, and sulfur hexafluoride. The Kyoto Protocol was to expire in 2020, to be superseded by the Paris Agreement. Countries are still determining the role of carbon offsets in the Paris Agreement through international negotiations on the agreement's Article 6.

In November 2024, after years of deadlock, governments attending the COP29 conference in Baku, Azerbaijan agreed to rules on creating, trading and registering emission reductions and removals as carbon credits that higher-emission countries can buy, thus providing funding for low-emission technologies.

== Economics ==
The economics behind programs such as the Kyoto Protocol was that the marginal cost of reducing emissions would differ among countries. Studies suggested that the flexibility mechanisms could reduce the overall cost of meeting the targets. Offset and credit programs have been identified as a way for countries to meet their NDC commitments and achieve the goals of the Paris agreement at a lower cost. They may also help close the emissions gap identified in annual UNEP reports.

There is a diverse range of sources of supply and demand as well as trading frameworks that drive offset and credit markets. Demand for offsets and credits derives from a range of compliance obligations, arising from international agreements, national laws, as well as voluntary commitments that companies and governments have adopted. Voluntary carbon markets usually consist of private entities purchasing carbon offset credits to meet voluntary greenhouse gas reduction commitments. In some cases, non-covered participants in an ETS may purchase credits as an alternative to purchasing offsets in a voluntary market.

These programs also have other positive externalities, or co-benefits, which include better air quality, increased biodiversity, and water and soil protection; community employment opportunities, energy access, and gender equality; and job creation, education opportunities, and technology transfer. Some certification programs have tools and research products to help quantify these benefits.

Prices for offsets and credits vary widely, reflecting the uncertainty associated with verifying the indirect value of carbon offsets. At the same time, uncertainty has caused some companies to become more skeptical about buying offsets .

=== Emissions trading systems ===
Emissions trading are now an important element of regulatory programs to control pollution, including GHG emissions. GHG emission trading programs exist at the sub-national, national, and international level. Under these programs, there is a cap on emissions. Sources of emissions have the flexibility to find and apply the lowest-cost methods for reducing pollution. A central authority or government body usually allocates or sells a limited number (a "cap") of permits. These permit a discharge of a specific quantity of a specific pollutant over a set time period. Polluters are required to hold permits in amounts equal to their emissions. Those that want to increase their emissions must buy permits from others willing to sell them. These programs have been applied to greenhouse gases for several reasons. Their warming effects are the same regardless of where they are emitted. The costs of reducing emissions vary widely by source. The cap ensures that the environmental goal is attained.

== Regulations and schemes ==
As of 2022, 68 carbon pricing programs were in place or scheduled to be created globally. International programs include the Clean Development Mechanism, Article 6 of the Paris Agreement, and CORSIA. National programs include ETS systems such as the European Union Emissions Trading System (EU-ETS) and the California Cap and Trade Program. Eligible credits in these programs may include credits that international or independent crediting systems have issued. There are also standards and crediting mechanisms that independent, nongovernmental entities such as Verra and Gold Standard manage.

=== Kyoto Protocol ===
Under the Clean Development Mechanism, a developed country can sponsor a greenhouse gas reduction project in a developing country, where the costs of greenhouse gas reduction activities are usually much lower. The developed country receives credits for meeting its emission reduction targets known as Certified Emission Reductions (CERs), while the developing country receives capital investment and clean technology or beneficial change in land use. Under Joint Implementation, a developed country with relatively high domestic costs of emission reduction would set up a project in another developed country. Offset credits under this program are designated as Emission Reduction Units.

The International Emissions Trading program enables countries to trade in the international carbon credit market to cover their shortfall in assigned amount units. Countries with surplus units can sell them to countries that are exceeding their emission targets under Annex B of the Kyoto Protocol.

Nuclear energy projects are not eligible for credits under these programs. Country-specific designated national authorities approve projects under the CDM.

=== Paris Agreement Article 6 mechanisms ===
Article 6 of the Paris Agreement continues to support offset and credit programs between countries, including CDM projects from the Kyoto Protocol. Programs now occur to help achieve emission reduction targets set out in each country's nationally determined contribution (NDC).

Article	Regulation	Ref
Art 6	Allows countries to transfer carbon credits from reducing GHG emissions to help other countries meet their climate targets.	
Art 6.2	Creates a program for trading GHG emission reductions via bilateral agreements between countries using credits known as internationally transferred mitigation outcomes (ITMOs). ITMOs can be purchased by countries to achieve NDCs, and also be used in market-based schemes such as CORSIA	
Art 6.4	Similar to the Clean Development Mechanism of the Kyoto Protocol, it establishes a centralized program to trade GHG emission reductions between countries, supervised by a UNFCCC supervisory board. Countries, companies, and individuals can buy Emission Reduction (ER) credits purchased under this program.	

The ITMO system requires "corresponding adjustments" to avoid double counting of emission reductions. Double-counting occurs if both the host country and purchasing country count the reduction towards their target. If the receiving country uses ITMOs towards its NDC, the host country must discount those reductions from its emissions budget by adding and reporting that higher total in its biennial reporting. Otherwise Article 6.2 gives countries a lot of flexibility in how they can create trading agreements.

The supervisory board under Article 6.4 is responsible for approving methodologies, setting guidance, and implementing procedures. The preparation work for this is expected to last until the end of 2023. ER credits issued will fall by 2% to ensure that the program as a whole results in an overall Mitigation of Global Emissions. An additional 5% reduction of ERs will go to a fund to finance adaptation. Administrative fees for program management are still under discussion.

CDM projects may transition to the Article 6.4 program subject to approval by the country hosting the project, and if the project meets the new rules, with certain exceptions for rules on methodologies. Projects can generally continue to use the same CDM methodologies through 2025. From 2026 on, they must meet all Article 6 requirements. Up to 2.8 billion credits could potentially become eligible for issuance under Article 6.4 if all CDM projects transition.

Article 6 does not directly regulate the voluntary carbon markets. In principle, it is possible to issue and purchase carbon offsets without reference to Article 6. It is possible that a multi-tier system could emerge with different types of offsets and credits available for investors. Companies may be able to purchase 'adjusted credits' that eliminate the risk of double counting. These may be seen as more valuable if they support science-based targets and net-zero emissions. Other non-adjusted offsets and credits could support claims for other environmental or social indicators. They could also support emission reductions that are seen as less valuable in terms of these goals. Uncertainty remains around Article 6's effects on future voluntary carbon markets. There is also uncertainty about what investors could claim by purchasing various types of carbon credits.

=== REDD+ ===
REDD+ is a UNFCCC framework, largely addressed at tropical regions in developing countries, that is designed to compensate countries for not clearing or degrading their forests, or for enhancing forest carbon stocks. It aims to create financial value for carbon stored in forests, using the concept of results-based payments. REDD+ also promotes co-benefits from reducing deforestation such as biodiversity. It was introduced in its basic form at COP11 in 2005 and has grown into a broad policy initiative to address deforestation and forest degradation.

In 2015, REDD+ was incorporated into Article 5 of the Paris Agreement. REDD+ initiatives typically compensate developing countries or their regional administrations for reducing their emissions from deforestation and forest degradation. It consists of several stages: One, achieving REDD+ readiness; two, formalizing an agreement for financing; three, measuring, reporting, and verifying results; and four, receiving results-based payments.

Over 50 countries have national REDD+ initiatives. REDD+ is also taking place through provincial and district governments and at the local level through private landowners. As of 2020, there were over 400 ongoing REDD+ projects globally. Brazil and Colombia account for the largest amount of REDD+ project land area.

=== CORSIA ===
The Carbon Offsetting and Reduction Scheme for International Aviation (CORSIA) is a global, market-based program to reduce emissions from international aviation. It aims to allow credits and offsets for emissions that cannot be reduced by technology and operational improvements or sustainable aviation fuels. To ensure the environmental integrity of these offsets, the program has developed a list of eligible offsets that can be used. Operating principles are similar to those under existing trading mechanisms and carbon offset certification standards. CORSIA was applied to international aviation since January 2019. At that point all airlines had been required to report their CO_{2} emissions on an annual basis. International flights must undertake offsetting under CORSIA since January 2021.

== Markets ==
Compliance market credits account for most of the offset and credit market today. Trading on voluntary carbon markets was 300 MtCO_{2}e in 2021. By comparison, the compliance carbon market trading volume was 12 GtCO_{2}e, and global greenhouse gas emissions in 2019 were 59 GtCO_{2}e.

Currently several exchanges trade in carbon credits and allowances covering both spot and futures markets. These include the Chicago Mercantile Exchange, CTX Global, the European Energy Exchange, Global Carbon Credit Exchange gCCEx, Intercontinental Exchange, MexiCO_{2}, NASDAQ OMX Commodities Europe and Xpansiv. Many companies now engage in emissions abatement, offsetting, and sequestration programs, which generate credits that can be sold on an exchange.

At the start of 2022 there were 25 operational emissions trading systems around the world. They are in jurisdictions representing 55% of global GDP. These systems cover 17% of global emissions. The European Union Emissions Trading System (EU-ETS) is the second largest trading system in the world after the Chinese national carbon trading scheme. It covers over 40% of European GHG emissions. California's cap-and-trade program covers about 85% of statewide GHG emissions.

=== Voluntary carbon markets and certification programs ===
Voluntary carbon markets (VCM) are largely unregulated markets where carbon offsets are traded by corporations, individuals and organizations that are under no legal obligation to make emission cuts. In voluntary carbon markets, companies or individuals use carbon offsets to meet the goals they set themselves for reducing emissions. Credits are issued under independent crediting standards. Some entities also purchase them under international or domestic crediting mechanisms. National and subnational programs have been increasing in popularity.

Many different groups exist within the voluntary carbon market, including developers, brokers, auditors, and buyers. Certification programs for VCMs establish accounting standards, project eligibility requirements, and monitoring, reporting and verification (MRV) procedures for credit and offset projects. They include the Verified Carbon Standard issued by Verra, the Gold Standard, the Global Carbon Council based in Qatar, the Climate Action Reserve, the American Carbon Registry, and Plan Vivo. Puro Standard, the first standard for engineered carbon removal, is verified by DNV GL. Isometric was the first carbon registry to issue credits for enhanced weathering carbon removal. There are also some additional standards for validating co-benefits, including the Climate, Community and Biodiversity Standard (CCB Standard), also issued by Verra, and the Social Carbon Standard, issued by the Ecologica Institute. The Integrity Council for the Voluntary Carbon Market (ICVCM) publishes the Core Carbon Principles (CCPs) as a benchmark for carbon credit integrity and assesses carbon crediting programs to determine whether they are "CCP-Eligible".

The voluntary carbon markets currently represent less than 1% of the reductions pledged in country NDCs by 2030. It represents an even smaller portion of the reductions needed to achieve the 1.5 °C Paris temperature goal pathway in 2030. However, the VCM is growing significantly. Between 2017 and 2021, both the issuance and retirement of VCM carbon offsets more than tripled. Some predictions call for global VCM demand to increase 15-fold between 2021 and 2030, and 100 times by 2050. Carbon removal projects such as forestry and carbon capture and storage are expected to have a larger share of this market in the future, compared to renewable energy projects. However, there is evidence that large companies are becoming more reluctant to use VCM offsets and credits because of a complex web of standards, despite an increased focus on net zero emissions goals.

==== Determining value ====
In 2022 voluntary carbon market (VCM) prices ranged from $8 to $30 per tonne of CO_{2}e for the most common types of offset projects. Several factors can affect these prices. The costs of developing a project are a significant factor. Those tied to projects that can sequester carbon have recently been selling at a premium compared to other projects such as renewable energy or energy efficiency. Projects that sequester carbon are also called Nature-Based Solutions. Projects with additional social and environmental benefits can command a higher price. This reflects the value of the co-benefits and the perceived value of association with these projects. Credits from a reputable organization may command a higher price. Some credits located in developed countries may be priced higher. One reason could be that companies prefer to back projects closer to their business sites. Conversely, carbon credits with older vintages tend to be valued lower on the market.

Prices on the compliance market are generally higher. They vary based on geography, with EU and UK ETS credits trading at higher prices than those in the US in 2022. Lower prices on the VCM are in part due to an excess of supply in relation to demand. Some types of offsets are able to be created at very low costs under present standards. Without this surplus, current VCM prices could be at least $10/tCO_{2}e higher.

Some pricing forecasts predict VCM prices could increase to as much as $47–$210 per tonne by 2050. There could be an even higher spike in the short term in certain scenarios. A major factor in future price models is the extent to which programs that support more permanent removals can influence future global climate policy. This could limit the supply of approvable offsets, and thereby raise prices.

Demand for VCM offsets is expected to increase five to ten-fold over the next decade as more companies adopt Net Zero climate commitments. This could benefit both markets and progress on reducing GHG emissions. If carbon offset prices remain significantly below these forecast levels, companies could be open to criticisms of greenwashing. This is because some might claim credit for emission reduction projects that would have been undertaken anyway. At prices of $100/tCO_{2}e, a variety of carbon removal technologies could deliver around 2 GtCO_{2}e per year of annual emission reductions between now and 2050. These technologies include reducing deforestation, forest restoration, CCS, BECCs and renewables in least developed countries. In addition, as the cost of using offsets and credits rises, investments in reducing supply chain emissions will become more attractive.

==== Verified Carbon Standard by Verra ====
Verra was developed in 2005. It is a widely used voluntary carbon standard, which also offers specific methodologies for REDD+ projects. As of 2020, there had been over 1,500 certified VCS projects covering energy, transport, waste, forestry, and other sectors. In 2021, Verra issued 300 MtCO_{2}e worth of offset credits for 110 projects. Verra is the program of choice for most of the forest credits in the voluntary market, and almost all REDD+ projects.

==== Gold Standard ====
The Gold Standard was developed in 2003 by the World Wide Fund for Nature (WWF) in consultation with an independent standards advisory board. Projects are open to any non-government, community-based organization. Allowable categories include renewable energy supply, energy efficiency, afforestation, reforestation, and agriculture. The program also promotes the Sustainable Developments Goals. Projects must meet at least three of those goals besides reducing GHG emissions. Projects must make a net-positive contribution to the economic, environmental and social welfare of the local population. Program monitoring requirements help determine this.

== Types of offset projects ==
A variety of projects can be used to reduce GHG emissions and thus to generate carbon offsets and credits. These can include land use improvement, methane capture, biomass sequestration, renewable energy, or industrial energy efficiency. They also include reducing methane, reforestation and switching fuel, for example to carbon-neutral and carbon-negative fuels. The CDM identifies over 200 types of projects suitable for generating carbon offsets and credits. An example of land use improvement is better forest management.

Offset certification and carbon trading programs vary by how much they consider specific projects eligible for offsets or credits. The European Union Emission Trading System considers nuclear energy projects, afforestation or reforestation activities, and projects involving destruction of industrial gases ineligible. Industrial gases include HFC-23 and N_{2}O.

=== Renewable energy ===
Renewable energy projects can include hydroelectric, wind, photovoltaic solar, solar hot water, biomass power, and heat production. These types of projects help societies move from electricity and heating based on fossil fuels towards forms of energy that are less carbon-intensive. However, they may not qualify as offset projects. This is because it is difficult or impossible to determine their additionality. They usually generate revenue. And they usually involve subsidies or other complex financial arrangements. This can make them ineligible under many offset and credit programs.

=== Methane collection and combustion ===
Methane is a potent greenhouse gas. It is most often emitted from landfills, livestock, and from coal mining. Methane projects can produce carbon offsets through the capture of methane for energy production. Examples include the combustion or containment of methane generated by farm animals by use of an anaerobic digester, in landfills, or from other industrial waste.

=== Energy efficiency ===
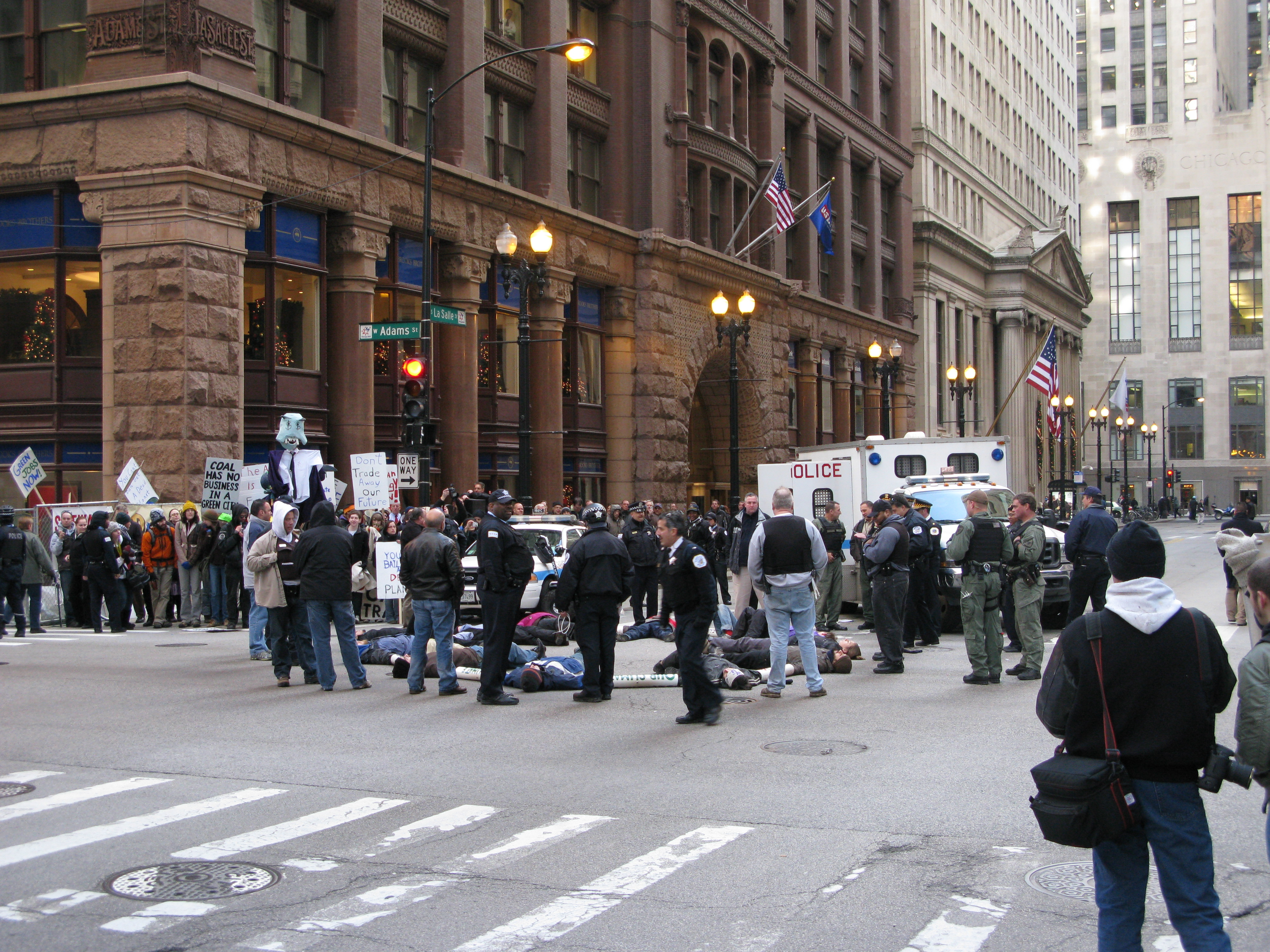
Chicago Climate Justice activists protesting cap and trade legislation in front of Chicago Climate Exchange building in Chicago Loop

Carbon offsets that fund renewable energy projects help lower the carbon intensity of energy supply. Energy conservation projects seek to reduce the overall demand for energy. Carbon offsets in this category fund projects of three main types.

Cogeneration plants generate both electricity and heat from the same power source. This improves upon the energy efficiency of most power plants. That is because these plants waste the energy generated as heat. Fuel efficiency projects replace a combustion device with one using less fuel per unit of energy provided. They can do this by optimizing industrial processes, reducing energy costs per unit. They can also optimize individual action, for example making it easier to cycle to work instead of driving.

=== Destruction of industrial pollutants ===
Industrial pollutants such as hydrofluorocarbons (HFCs) and perfluorocarbons (PFCs) have a much greater potential for global warming than carbon dioxide by volume. It is easy to capture and destroy these pollutants at their source. So they present a large low-cost source of carbon offsets. As a category, HFCs, PFCs, and N_{2}O reductions represent 71 percent of offsets issued under the CDM. Since many of these are now banned by an amendment to the Montreal Protocol, they are often no longer eligible for offsets or credits.

=== Land use, land-use change and forestry ===
Land use, land-use change and forestry have the collective label LULUCF. LULUCF projects focus on natural carbon sinks such as forests and soil. There are a number of different types of LULUCF projects. Forestry-related projects focus on avoiding deforestation. They do this by protecting existing forests, restoring forests on land that was once forested, and creating forests on land that previously had no forests, typically for more than a generation. Soil management projects attempt to preserve or increase the amount of carbon sequestered in soil.

Deforestation is particularly significant in Brazil, Indonesia, and parts of Africa, accounting for about 20 percent of greenhouse gas emissions. Carbon offsets allow firms to avoid deforestation by paying directly for forest preservation or providing substitutes for forest-based products. Offset schemes using reforestation, such as REDD, are available in developing countries, and are becoming increasingly available in developed countries including the US and the UK.

China has a policy of forestry carbon credits. Forestry carbon credits are based on the measurement of forest growth, which is converted into carbon emission reduction measurements by government ecological and forestry offices. Owners of forests (who are typically rural families or rural villages) receive carbon tickets (碳票; tan piao) which are tradeable securities.

== Processes ==
=== Creation ===
An offset project is designed by project developers, financed by investors, validated by an independent verifier, and registered with a carbon offset program. Official registration indicates that a program has approved the project and that the project is eligible to start generating carbon offset credits once it starts. Most carbon offset programs have a library of approved methodologies covering a range of project types. After a project has begun, programs will often verify it periodically to determine the quantity of emission reductions generated. The length of time between verifications can vary, but is typically one year. After a program approves verification reports, it issues carbon offset credits, which are deposited in the project developer's account in a registry system administered by the offset program.

=== Criteria for assessing quality ===
Criteria for assessing the quality of offsets and credits usually cover the following areas:

- Baseline and Measurement
- Additionality
- Leakage
- Permanence
- Double counting
- Co-benefits

=== Approaches for increasing integrity ===
Besides the certification programs mentioned above, industry groups have been working since the 2000s to promote the quality of these projects. The International Carbon Reduction and Offset Alliance (ICROA) was founded in 2008. It promotes best practice across the voluntary carbon market. ICROA's membership consists of carbon offset providers based in the United States, European and Asia-Pacific markets who commit to the ICROA Code of Best Practice.

Other groups are now advocating for new approaches to ensure that offsets and credits have integrity. The Oxford Offsetting Principles state that traditional carbon offsetting schemes are "unlikely to deliver the types of offsetting needed to ultimately reach net zero emissions." These principles focus instead on cutting emissions as a first priority. In terms of offsets, they advocate for shifting to carbon removal offset projects that involve long-term storage. The principles also support the development of offsetting aligned with net zero. The Science Based Targets initiative's net-zero criteria argue that it is important to move beyond offsets based on reduced or avoided emissions. Instead projects should base offsets on carbon that has been sequestered from the atmosphere, such as CO_{2} Removal Certificates.

Some initiatives focus on improving the quality of current carbon offset and credit projects. The Integrity Council for the Voluntary Carbon Market has published a draft set of principles for determining a high integrity carbon credit. These are known as the Core Carbon Principles. Final guidelines for this program are expected in late 2023. The Voluntary Carbon Markets Integrity Initiative has developed a code of practice that was published in 2022. The UK government partly funds this initiative.

== Limitations and drawbacks ==
The use of offsets and credits faces a variety of criticisms. Some argue that they promote a "business-as-usual" mindset, allowing companies to use carbon offsetting to avoid making larger changes to reduce carbon emissions at source.

Research from The Australia Institute has suggested that at least 25% of carbon offsets may lack integrity, describing them as "hot air." Additionally, some reports have raised concerns that carbon offsets could be used to justify the continuation or expansion of fossil fuel projects, potentially delaying direct efforts to reduce emissions.

Using projects in this way is called "greenwashing". Pope Francis noted in his 2015 encyclical letter Laudato si' the risk that countries and sectors may use carbon credits as "a ploy which permits maintaining [their] excessive consumption".

Many projects that give credits for carbon sequestration have received criticism as greenwashing because they overstated their ability to sequester carbon, with some projects being shown to actually increase overall emissions.

In 2023, a civil suit was brought against Delta Air Lines based on its use of carbon credits to support claims of carbon neutrality. In 2016 the Öko-Institut analyzed a series of CDM projects. It found that 85% had a low likelihood of being truly additional or were likely to over-estimate emission reductions. In 2023, the University of California all but dropped the purchase of offsets in favor of direct reductions in emissions. An additional challenge is that carbon pricing and existing policies are still inadequate to meet Paris goals. However, there is evidence that companies that invest in offsets and credits tend to make more ambitious emissions cuts compared with companies that do not.

Researchers have raised the concern that the use of carbon offsets – such as by maintaining forests, reforestation or carbon capture – as well as renewable energy certificates allow polluting companies a business-as-usual approach to continue releasing greenhouse gases and for being, inappropriately trusted, untried techno-fixes.

=== Oversight issues ===
Several certification standards exist, with different ways of measuring emissions baseline, reductions, additionality, and other key criteria. However, no single standard governs the industry. Some offset providers have faced criticism that their carbon reduction claims are exaggerated or misleading. For example, carbon credits issued by the California Air Resources Board were found to use a formula that established fixed boundaries around forest regions. This created simplified, regional averages for the carbon stored in a wide mix of tree species.

Some experts have estimated that California's cap and trade program has generated between 20 million and 39 million forestry credits that do not achieve real climate benefits. This amounts to nearly one in three credits issued through that program. The Australia Institute shares that while Australia's carbon offset system appears to be regulated, it lacks independent verification and transparency. The government doesn't release the data that would allow independent scrutiny of offset projects.Without reliable data or oversight, there is no way to verify the effectiveness of these projects, which can lead to misleading claims and potentially increase emissions, especially when offsets are used to justify new fossil fuel projects.

Determining additionality can be difficult. This may present risks for buyers of offsets or credits. Carbon projects that yield strong financial returns even in the absence of revenue from carbon credits are usually not considered additional. Another example is projects that are compelled by regulations. Projects representing common practice in an industry are also usually not considered additional. A full determination of additionality requires a careful investigation of proposed carbon offset projects.

Offsets provide a revenue stream for the reduction of some types of emissions, so they can lead to perverse incentives. They may provide incentives to emit more, so that emitting entities can get credit for reducing emissions from an artificially high baseline. Regulatory agencies could address these situations. This could involve setting specific standards for verifiability, uniqueness, and transparency.

=== Concerns with forestry projects ===
Forestry projects have faced increasing criticism over their integrity as offset or credit programs. A number of news stories from 2021 to 2023 criticized nature-based carbon offsets, the REDD+ program, and certification organizations. In one case it was estimated that around 90% of rainforest offset credits of the Verified Carbon Standard are likely to be "phantom credits".

Tree planting projects in particular have been problematic. Critics point to a number of concerns. Trees reach maturity over a course of many decades. It is difficult to guarantee how long the forest will last. It may suffer clearing, burning, or mismanagement. Some tree-planting projects introduce fast-growing invasive species. These end up damaging native forests and reducing biodiversity. In response, some certification standards such as the Climate Community and Biodiversity Standard require multiple species plantings. Tree planting in high latitude forests may have a net warming effect on the Earth's climate because tree cover absorbs sunlight thus creating a warming effect that balances out their absorption of carbon dioxide. Tree-planting projects can also cause conflicts with local communities and Indigenous people if the project displaces or otherwise curtails their use of forest resources.

=== Lack of impact on the company's own operations ===
Offsetting, while a widely used tool for addressing greenhouse gas emissions, has inherent limitations in directly reducing carbon emissions at the source. By purchasing carbon credits from external projects, companies invest in external projects to counterbalance emissions, often through reforestation or renewable energy initiatives. However, offsetting has faced significant scrutiny and exploitation. There have been many cases of large companies purchasing carbon credits to offset their emissions without taking meaningful action to reduce their own emissions directly.

== See also ==
- African carbon market
- Cap and dividend
- Cap and Share
- Carbon Border Adjustment Mechanism
- Carbon tax
- Chinese national carbon trading scheme
