= Impacts of shipping on marine wildlife and habitats in Southeast Asia =

Southeast Asia (orthographic projection)

Southeast Asia is home to a diverse marine environment. The region is host to extensive coral reefs, mangroves and seagrass beds, and has even been described as the Amazon rainforest of the ocean. The region is estimated to contain approximately 35% of the world’s mangrove species and over 45% of the world’s seagrass species. The shipping industry has multiple damaging impacts on marine habitats and wildlife, such as pollution from port activities, oil spills, ballast and bilge discharge, waste dumping from ships, and direct physical impact from grounding and anchor damage.

== Background ==
Southeast Asia is defined to include countries such as Brunei, Cambodia, Malaysia, Indonesia, Myanmar, the Philippines, Singapore, Thailand, Timor-Leste, and Vietnam. It is positioned at the crossroads of the Indian Ocean, the Pacific Ocean, and the South China Sea. The region, characterized by extensive coastlines and numerous islands, is a global biodiversity hotspot with significant marine resources, including a large proportion of the world's reefs and mangroves. However, it faces critical challenges due to pollution resulting from rapid urbanization, industrialization, deforestation, and intensive farming and aquaculture activities., and the rapidly growing shipping industry. Southeast Asia is a busy transportation corridor, that Is likely to get busier especially as The Belt and Road Initiative (BRI) is rolled out Impacts of the shipping industry include physical changes to marine habitats from anchoring, mooring and vessel grounding, the use of antifouling, operational and accidental discharges (ballast and bilge water, hydrocarbons, waste, and sewage) and wildlife collisions. Overall, evidence shows the shipping industry has detrimental impacts to ecosystems and biodiversity in the Southeast Asian region. Global advocacy is intensifying for the implementation of stricter regulatory measures within the shipping industry, aimed at safeguarding endangered species and preserving vital wildlife habitats.

=== Shipping industry in Southeast Asia ===
Economic progress in the 20th and 21st centuries in Pacific Asia has coincided with a notable increase in container port traffic, leading to the establishment of a significant maritime trade route and its associated links. Southeast Asia, strategically located along major global shipping routes, is a pivotal hub in global maritime trade. The region is home to some of the world's busiest ports and shipping lanes. The main shipping routes in this region include The Strait of Malacca, The Singapore Straight, The South China Sea Routes, The Sunda Strait and the Lombok Strait. These routes are frequented by a multitude of vessels, connecting the bustling ports of Singapore, Port Klang in Malaysia, and the Port of Tanjung Pelepas, also in Malaysia, which are among the busiest in the world. Singapore's ports, in particular, stand out as a global leader in container throughput and transhipment activities. Major shipping companies like CMA CGM Asia Pacific Limited of Singapore and Evergreen Marine from Taiwan have a significant presence in the region. With the growth of seaborne trade, Southeast Asia's share of world trade has significantly increased, and eight of the top ten global container ports are located in this region. Southeast Asia is China’s largest trade partner. Looking to the future the shipping industry is predicted to grow in the region

== Habitat disruptions ==
The shipping industry can be harmful to marine habitats by causing disturbances from anchoring and mooring activities, which causes seabed scouring and damage to benthic habitats, including seagrass meadows and coral reefs. Vessel groundings can cause significant damage to coral reefs and soft bottom habitats, altering community structure and hydrodynamics The construction of shipping ports also has a number of negative impacts on marine wildlife. Coastal mangroves are often damaged in the construction of shipping ports. This is significant as these areas provide nurseries for marine fish and other species This has greatly affected waterbirds around the Manila port in the Philippines. A recent Waterbird Census in Manila Bay revealed a decline of more than 20% in waterbird populations since 2017. This census documented around 117,000 waterbirds, encompassing 62 species; These species are heavily dependent on wetlands for their survival. The primary causes for this decline are habitat loss and degradation due to land reclamation and commercial shipping activities. Key habitats such as sandbars and intertidal mudflats are diminishing around Manilla Bay, largely due to the issuance of permits for land reclamation and commercial dredging, which deteriorates waterbird habitat. Marine mammal habitats have been subject to degradation in the Philippines, Malaysia, and Thailand. It has been estimated that the Philippines has lost about 30–50% of its seagrass habitat in recent decades due to a combination of natural and man-made threats, of which shipping is a considerable one. The Vietnamese coastlines have seen a serious decline in the volume and quality of sea grass beds in recent years.

Another significant impact is noise pollution from shipping traffic, which interferes with the communication and navigation of marine mammals like whales and dolphins, potentially leading to disorientation and increased stress levels. The noise interference can lead to behavioural changes, such as altered migration patterns, reduced mating success, and impaired feeding habits. These disruptions can have large effects on the marine ecosystem, affecting predator-prey dynamics and overall biodiversity. Additionally, noise pollution can cause chronic stress in marine animals, leading to weakened immune systems and increased vulnerability to disease. In regions like the South China Sea and the Strait of Malacca, some of the world's busiest shipping lanes, the intensity of these impacts is heightened. Low-frequency sounds from shipping vessels interfere with the communication and navigation abilities of marine mammals, particularly cetaceans like whales and dolphins, who rely on echolocation for finding food, navigating, and social interaction. In areas with high shipping traffic, there is a marked increase in stress-related behaviour among these species, leading to altered feeding patterns and migration routes. Southeast Asian waters are home to a plethora of marine mammals, including dolphins, porpoises, killer whales, sperm whales, blue whales, sea lions and seals, all of which are at risk from the impacts of noise pollution

== Accidental wildlife collision ==
Collisions between shipping vessels and marine mammals in Southeast Asia have become an increasingly concerning issue, with empirical data underscoring the gravity of the situation. Vessel collisions pose hazards to aquatic vertebrates like turtles, dolphins, whales, and manatees. Studies reveal that large whales, including the endangered blue and humpback whales, are particularly at risk. Data from maritime reports and stranding networks indicate a rising trend in ship strikes, with several cases of whales found with propeller scars or blunt force injuries consistent with vessel collisions. In 2023, an autopsy of a stranded whale along the coast of Thailand revealed evidence of blunt force trauma and deep propeller cuts, confirming encounters with large vessels. The dense marine traffic, combined with the presence of important feeding and breeding grounds for these mammals, creates a dangerous environment. It has been reported that there has been an increase in ship strikes over the past decade in Southeast Asia. A report of the Third South East Asian Marine Mammal Symposium (SEAMAM), stated that boat strikes from commercial shipping represent a significant risk to snubfin Dolphins and Indo-Pacific humpback dolphins in Malaysia. Moreover, it has been highlighted that in areas around Indonesia and the Philippines, collisions are often underreported due to a lack of awareness and reporting infrastructure. A crucial aspect of this issue is the migratory patterns of these marine mammals, which often intersect with shipping routes. The "Southeast Asian Marine Mammal Stranding Network" (SEAMMSN) in its annual report, noted that migration routes of blue whales and other large cetaceans coincide with some of the busiest shipping lanes in the world. This overlap significantly increases the likelihood of collisions. Conservationists and marine biologists are pushing for enhanced monitoring systems, such as acoustic monitoring and satellite tracking, to better understand and mitigate collision risks. They also advocate for the establishment of mandatory reporting for vessel collisions with wildlife and the development of alternative shipping routes that avoid key marine mammal habitats. Efforts to mitigate these risks have been proposed, including the establishment of marine protected areas (MPAs), rerouting of shipping lanes, and implementing ship speed restrictions in areas of high cetacean activity

== Pollution ==
The shipping industry is a source of chemical pollution, including oil spills and toxic antifouling paints, which harm marine life through direct toxicity and the accumulation of pollutants in the food chain. Shipping vessel-related greenhouse gas emissions primarily come from internal combustion engines. The emissions include CO_{2}, SOX, and NOX, contributing significantly to global anthropogenic emissions. East Asia has experienced the fastest growth in shipping emissions, both CO_{2} and traditional air pollutants. The region's shipping emissions accounted for 16% of global shipping CO_{2} in 2013. GHGs from vessel operations, such as propulsion and refrigeration, can lead to decreased air and water quality, impacts on aquatic species, and climate alteration

Shipping vessels also contribute to marine pollution through discarded items, leading to ingestion and entanglement hazards for aquatic wildlife. Plastics, in particular, pose a significant threat due to their complex chemical composition and persistence in the environment. Antifouling Agents (AF) are applied to vessel hulls to prevent organism settlement and include various biocides like copper, TBT, and Irgarol 1051 these agents can impact water column and benthic biota due to their toxicity. Current alternative AF agents, such as algaecides and copper-based coatings, have been found to accumulate in the marine environment, causing toxic effects against non-target species. These agents can have devastating effects on ecosystems and marine biodiversity, especially through fisheries in the region.

Structural failures, leaks, and discharges from shipping vessels introduce hydrocarbons into aquatic environments They contain toxic substances like monocyclic and polycyclic aromatic hydrocarbons (PAHs), which can be lethal to aquatic organisms and lead to long-term carcinogenic impacts. Crude oil and refined petroleum products contain toxic substances that can be lethal to various aquatic organisms and affect their behaviour and reproduction. Oil spills in Southeast Asia have significant impacts on marine wildlife and habitats. A notable example is the sinking of the oil tanker MT Princess Empress in February 2023 in the Philippines' Verde Island Passage, spilling 800,000 litres of industrial oil. This disaster occurred in one of the world's most important biodiversity hotspots, affecting a critical waterway and the surrounding environment.

== Mitigation and management strategies ==
In terms of regulation, Southeast Asian nations, through the Association of Southeast Asian Nations (ASEAN) and other regional bodies, have been involved in discussions to mitigate the impact of shipping on the marine environment. However, the implementation and enforcement of international maritime laws and conventions, such as the International Maritime Organization's (IMO) guidelines for the reduction of underwater noise for example, are challenging. Compliance varies among countries due to differences in domestic priorities, economic considerations, and capacities for enforcement. The Marine Environment Protection of the South-East Asian Seas (MEPSEAS) project is a key initiative aimed at building capacity in developing countries to ratify and implement various International Maritime Organization (IMO) conventions. These conventions include the International Convention on the Control of Harmful Anti-fouling Systems on Ships (AFS Convention), the International Convention for the Control and Management of Ships' Ballast Water and Sediments (BWM Convention), and several annexes of the International Convention for the Prevention of Pollution from Ships (MARPOL). The ASEAN Maritime Transport Working Group (MTWG) and other regional partnerships, like Partnerships in Environmental Management for the Seas of East Asia (PEMSEA) and the Tokyo Memorandum of Understanding (TMOU), collaborate to enhance the implementation of these conventions.

Increased marine traffic in the Southeast Asian region is likely to raise risks to endangered and sensitive ecosystems. Looking to the future there is a need for comprehensive strategies to control pollution, including education and policy changes and integrating marine pollution concerns into existing conservation strategies. to help mitigate the negative impacts of the shipping industry on marine life around Southeast Asian. There is a need for the participation of governments and international organisations, such as the UN to help protect marine wildlife and ecosystems from the negative impacts of the shipping industry
