= Deforestation and climate change =

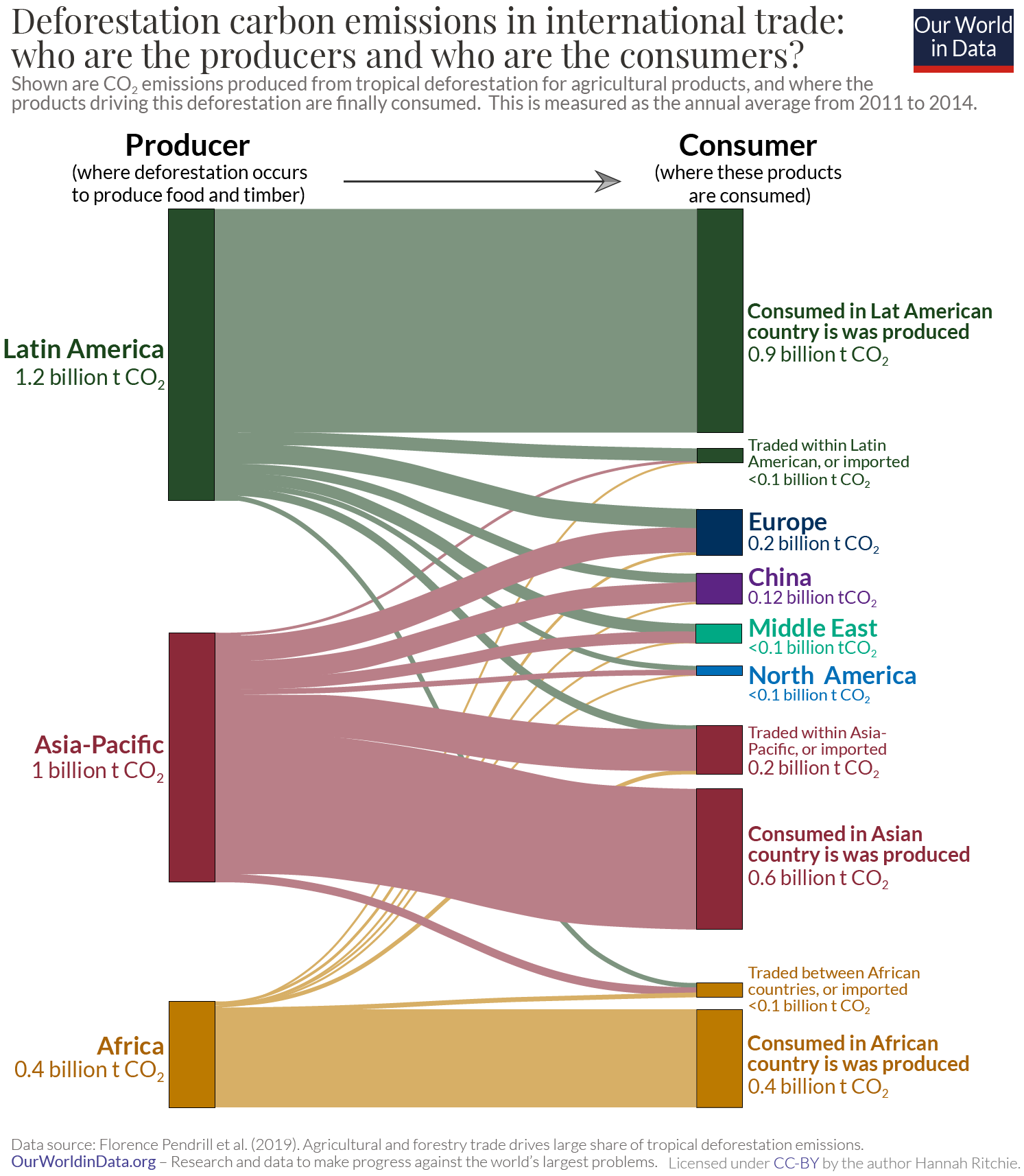
Deforestation in the tropics – given as the annual average between 2010 and 2014 – was responsible for 2.6 billion tonnes of CO_{2} per year. That was 6.5% of global CO_{2} emissions.

Deforestation is a primary contributor to climate change, and climate change affects the health of forests. Land use change, especially in the form of deforestation, is the second largest source of carbon dioxide emissions from human activities, after the burning of fossil fuels. Greenhouse gases are emitted from deforestation during the burning of forest biomass and decomposition of remaining plant material and soil carbon. Global models and national greenhouse gas inventories give similar results for deforestation emissions. As of 2019, deforestation is responsible for about 11% of global greenhouse gas emissions. Carbon emissions from tropical deforestation are accelerating.

When forests grow they are a carbon sink and therefore have potential to mitigate the effects of climate change. Some of the effects of climate change, such as more wildfires, invasive species, and extreme weather events can lead to more forest loss. The relationship between deforestation and climate change is one of a positive (amplifying) climate feedback. The more trees that are removed, the greater the effect of climate change which then results in the loss of more trees.

Forests cover 31% of the land area on Earth. Every year, 75,700 square kilometers (18.7 million acres) of the forest is lost. There was a 12% increase in the loss of primary tropical forests from 2019 to 2020.

Deforestation has many causes, among them agricultural clearcutting, livestock grazing, logging for timber, and wildfires.

== Causes of deforestation ==
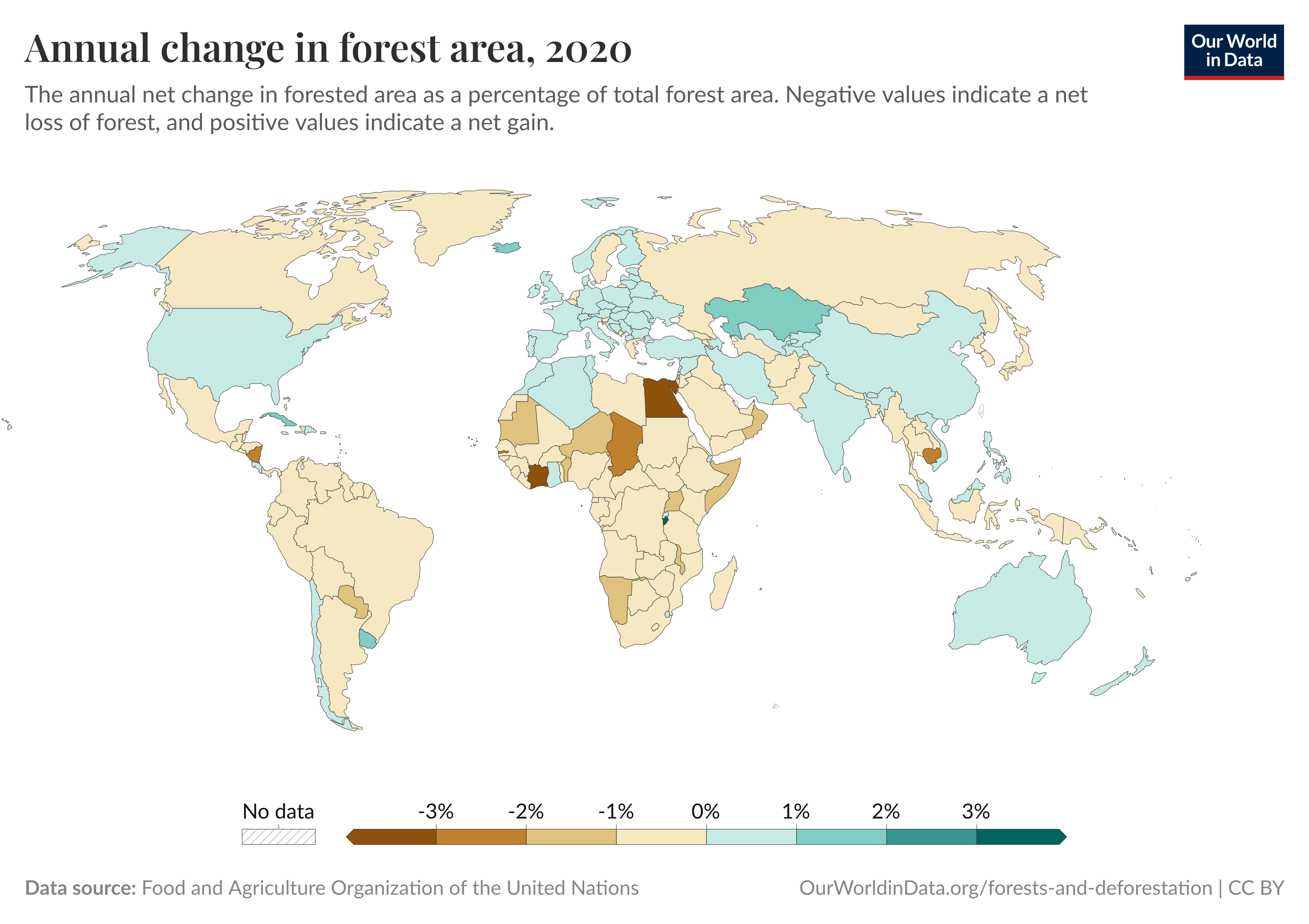
Forest area net change rate per country in 2020

=== Causes due to climate change ===
The rate of global tree cover loss has approximately doubled since 2001, to an annual loss approaching an area the size of Italy.

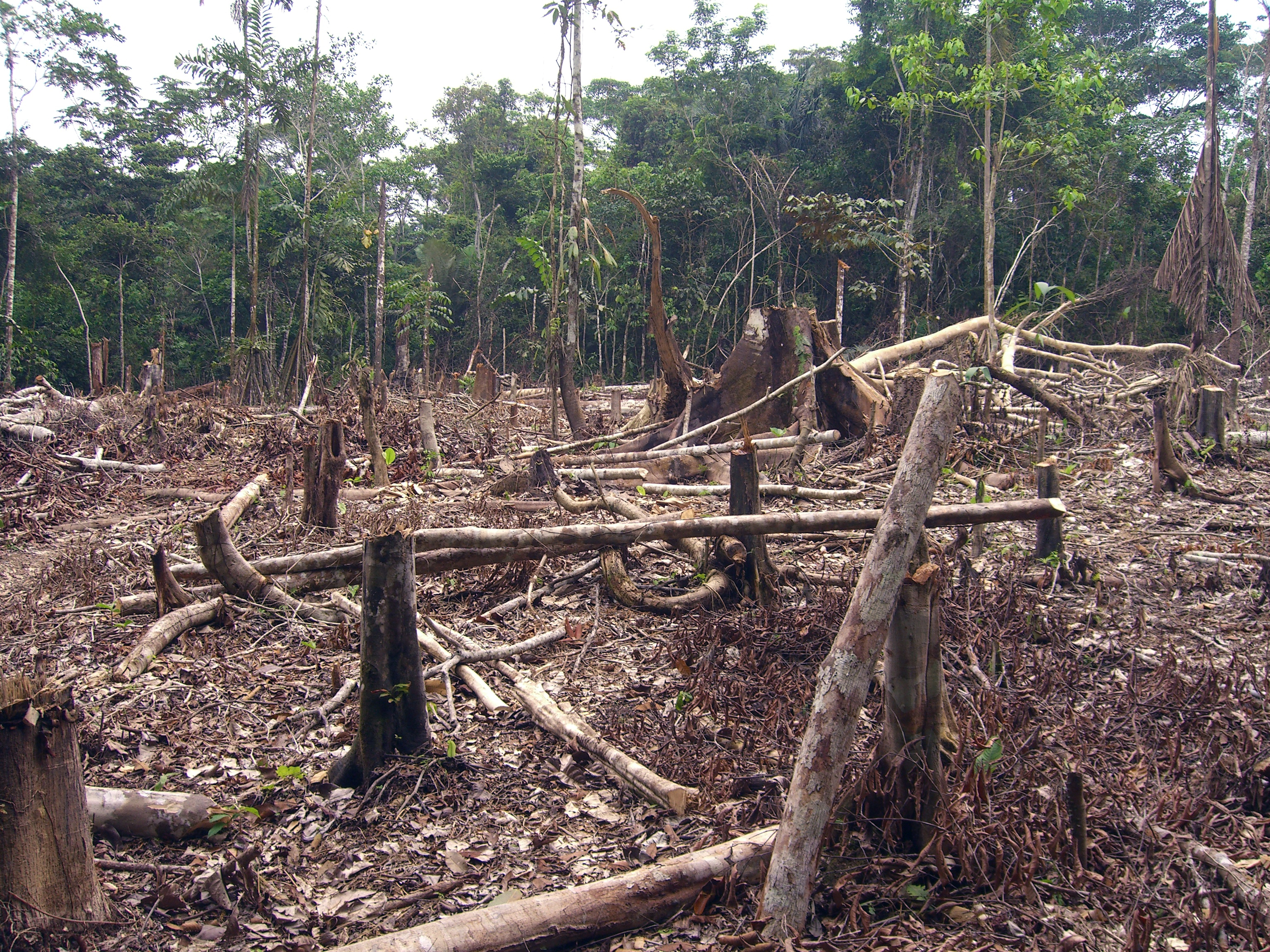
Amazon slash-and-burn agriculture, Colombia

Globally, wildfires and deforestation have reduced forests' net absorption of greenhouse gases, reducing their effectiveness at mitigating climate change. Global warming increases forest fires that release more greenhouse gases, creating a feedback loop that causes more warming.

Over recent decades, "forest disturbance" (damage) by fire has increased in most of the planet's forest zones. The increase in area, frequency, and severity of forest fires creates a positive feedback that increases global warming.

Another cause of deforestation is due to the effects of climate change: More wildfires, insect outbreaks, invasive species, and more frequent extreme weather events (such as storms) are factors that increase deforestation.

A study suggests that "tropical, arid and temperate forests are experiencing a significant decline in resilience, probably related to increased water limitations and climate variability" which may shift ecosystems towards critical transitions and ecosystem collapses. By contrast, "boreal forests show divergent local patterns with an average increasing trend in resilience, probably benefiting from warming and CO_{2} fertilization, which may outweigh the adverse effects of climate change". It has been proposed that a loss of resilience in forests "can be detected from the increased temporal autocorrelation (TAC) in the state of the system, reflecting a decline in recovery rates due to the critical slowing down (CSD) of system processes that occur at thresholds".

23% of tree cover losses result from wildfires and climate change increase their frequency and power. The rising temperatures cause massive wildfires especially in the Boreal forests. One possible effect is the change of the forest composition. Deforestation can also cause forests to become more fire prone through mechanisms such as logging.

== Effects of deforestation from climate change ==
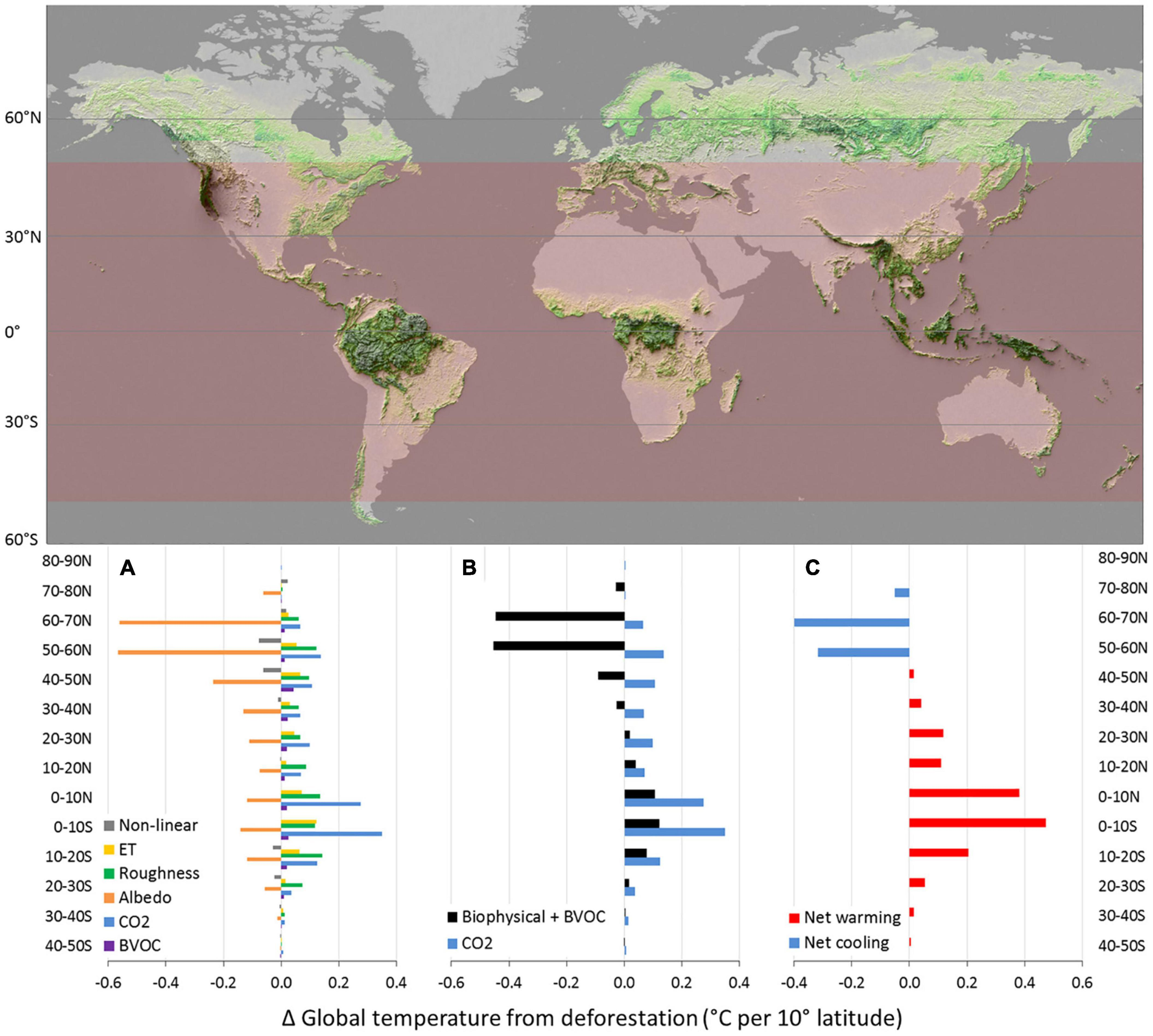
Biophysical mechanisms by which forests influence climate

Irreversible deforestation would result in a permanent rise in the global surface temperature. Moreover, it suggests that standing tropical forests help cool the average global temperature by more than 1 °C or 1.8 °F. Deforestation of tropical forests may risk triggering tipping points in the climate system and of forest ecosystem collapse which would also have effects on climate change.

Several studies since the early 1990s have shown that large-scale deforestation north of 50°N leads to overall net global cooling while tropical deforestation produces substantial warming. Carbon-centric metrics are inadequate because biophysical mechanisms other than CO_{2} impacts are important, especially the much higher albedo of bare high-latitude ground vis-à-vis intact forest.

Deforestation, particularly in large swaths of the Amazon, where nearly 20% of the rainforest has been clear cut, has climactic effects and effects on water sources as well as on the soil. A shrinkage in water sources increases droughts, which can also bring about more frequent fires. Moreover, the type of land usage after deforestation also produces varied results. When deforested land is converted to pasture land for livestock grazing it has a greater effect on the ecosystem than forest to cropland conversions. Deforestation, specifically in the Amazon, also destroys habitats for many species of plants and animals. Other effect of deforestation in the Amazon rainforest is seen through the greater amount of carbon dioxide emission. The Amazon rainforest absorbs one-fourth of the carbon dioxide emissions on Earth, however, the amount of CO_{2} absorbed today decreases by 30% than it was in the 1990s due to deforestation.

Modeling studies have concluded that there are two crucial moments that can lead to devastating effects in the Amazon rainforest which are increase in temperature by 4 °C or 7.2 °F and deforestation reaching a level of 40%.The time zone for these events is between 50 years and 200 years with researchers predicting that 100 years is the best estimate there is until the Amazon rainforest hits its tipping point.

=== Forest fires ===
Statistics have shown a direct correlation between forest fires and deforestation. Statistics regarding the Brazilian Amazon area during the early 2000s have shown that fires and the air pollution that accompanies these fires mirror the patterns of deforestation and "high deforestation rates led to frequent fires".

The Amazon rainforest has experienced fires inside the forest as well as wildfires on its outer edges. Wetlands have faced an increase in forest fires as well. Due to the change in temperature, the climate around forests have become warm and dry, conditions that allow forest fires to occur.

Under unmitigated climate change, by the end of the century, 21% of the Amazon would be vulnerable to post‐fire grass invasion. In 3% of the Amazon, fire return intervals are already shorter than the time required for grass exclusion by canopy recovery, implying a high risk of irreversible shifts to a fire‐maintained degraded forest grassy state. The south‐eastern region of the Amazon is currently at highest risk of irreversible degradation.

According to a study in tropical peatland forest of Borneo, deforestation also contributes to the increase in fire risk.

=== Carbon sequestration through forestry ===
Forests are an important part of the global carbon cycle because trees and plants absorb carbon dioxide through photosynthesis. Therefore, they play an important role in climate change mitigation. By removing the greenhouse gas CO_{2} from the air, forests function as terrestrial carbon sinks, meaning they store large amounts of carbon in the form of biomass, encompassing roots, stems, branches, and leaves. By doing so, forests sequester approximately 25% of human carbon emissions annually, playing a critical role in Earth's climate. Throughout their lifespan, trees continue to sequester carbon, storing atmospheric CO_{2} long-term. Sustainable forest management, afforestation, reforestation are therefore important contributions to climate change mitigation.

An important consideration in such efforts is that forests can turn from sinks to carbon sources. In 2019 forests took up a third less carbon than they did in the 1990s, due to higher temperatures, droughts and deforestation. National-scale forest inventory data also shows trends from 1999 to 2020 that some forests were already approaching climate thresholds shifting them from carbon sinks to carbon sources. The typical tropical forest may become a carbon source by the 2060s.

Researchers have found that, in terms of environmental services, it is better to avoid deforestation than to allow for deforestation to subsequently reforest, as the latter leads to irreversible effects in terms of biodiversity loss and soil degradation. Furthermore, the probability that legacy carbon will be released from soil is higher in a younger boreal forest. In particular, boreal forests have been noted to support the growth of Armillaria (honey fungus), which is a root pathogen that breaks down compounds necessary for wood integrity, increasing the likelihood of carbon release. Global greenhouse gas emissions caused by damage to tropical rainforests may have been substantially underestimated until around 2019. Additionally, the effects of afforestation and reforestation will be farther in the future than keeping existing forests intact. It takes much longer − several decades − for the benefits for global warming to manifest to the same carbon sequestration benefits from mature trees in tropical forests and hence from limiting deforestation. Therefore, scientists consider "the protection and recovery of carbon-rich and long-lived ecosystems, especially natural forests" to be "the major climate solution".

The planting of trees on marginal crop and pasture lands helps to incorporate carbon from atmospheric CO_{2} into biomass. For this carbon sequestration process to succeed the carbon must not return to the atmosphere from biomass burning or rotting when the trees die. Several species of Ficus such as Ficus wakefieldii have been observed to sequester atmospheric CO_{2} as calcium oxalate in the presence of oxalotrophic bacteria and fungi, which catabolize the oxalate, which produces calcium carbonate. The calcium carbonate is precipitated throughout the tree, which also alkalinizes the surrounding soil. These species are current candidates for carbon sequestration in agroforestry. Another example for an oxalogene tree is Brosimum alicastrum. This Calcium-oxalate fixation process was first observed in the Iroko tree, which can sequester up to a ton of calcium carbonate in the soil over its lifespan. Also Cacti, such as the Saguaro, transfer carbon from the biological cycle to the geological cycle by forming the mineral calcium carbonate.

Earth offers enough room to plant an additional 0.9 billion ha of tree canopy cover, although this estimate has been criticized, and the true area that has a net cooling effect on the climate when accounting for biophysical feedbacks like albedo is 20-80% lower. Planting and protecting these trees would sequester 205 billion tons of carbon if the trees survive future climate stress to reach maturity. To put this number into perspective, this is about 20 years of current global carbon emissions (as of 2019) . This level of sequestration would represent about 25% of the atmosphere's carbon pool in 2019.

Life expectancy of forests varies throughout the world, influenced by tree species, site conditions, and natural disturbance patterns. In some forests, carbon may be stored for centuries, while in other forests, carbon is released with frequent stand replacing fires. Forests that are harvested prior to stand replacing events allow for the retention of carbon in manufactured forest products such as lumber. However, only a portion of the carbon removed from logged forests ends up as durable goods and buildings. The remainder ends up as sawmill by-products such as pulp, paper, and pallets. If all new construction globally utilized 90% wood products, largely via adoption of mass timber in low rise construction, this could sequester 700 million net tons of carbon per year. This is in addition to the elimination of carbon emissions from the displaced construction material such as steel or concrete, which are carbon-intense to produce.

A meta-analysis found that mixed species plantations would increase carbon storage alongside other benefits of diversifying planted forests.

Although a bamboo forest stores less total carbon than a mature forest of trees, a bamboo plantation sequesters carbon at a much faster rate than a mature forest or a tree plantation. Therefore, the farming of bamboo timber may have significant carbon sequestration potential.

The Food and Agriculture Organization (FAO) reported that: "The total carbon stock in forests decreased from 668 gigatonnes in 1990 to 662 gigatonnes in 2020". In Canada's boreal forests as much as 80% of the total carbon is stored in the soils as dead organic matter.

The IPCC Sixth Assessment Report says: "Secondary forest regrowth and restoration of degraded forests and non-forest ecosystems can play a large role in carbon sequestration (high confidence) with high resilience to disturbances and additional benefits such as enhanced biodiversity."

Impacts on temperature are affected by the location of the forest. For example, reforestation in boreal or subarctic regions has less impact on climate. This is because it substitutes a high-albedo, snow-dominated region with a lower-albedo forest canopy. By contrast, tropical reforestation projects lead to a positive change such as the formation of clouds. These clouds then reflect the sunlight, lowering temperatures.

Planting trees in tropical climates with wet seasons has another advantage. In such a setting, trees grow more quickly (fixing more carbon) because they can grow year-round. Trees in tropical climates have, on average, larger, brighter, and more abundant leaves than non-tropical climates. A study of the girth of 70,000 trees across Africa has shown that tropical forests fix more carbon dioxide pollution than previously realized. The research suggested almost one-fifth of fossil fuel emissions are absorbed by forests across Africa, Amazonia and Asia. Simon Lewis stated, "Tropical forest trees are absorbing about 18% of the carbon dioxide added to the atmosphere each year from burning fossil fuels, substantially buffering the rate of change."

==== Concerns with forestry projects ====
Forestry projects have faced increasing criticism over their integrity as offset or credit programs. A number of news stories from 2021 to 2023 criticized nature-based carbon offsets, the REDD+ program, and certification organizations. In one case it was estimated that around 90% of rainforest offset credits of the Verified Carbon Standard are likely to be "phantom credits".

Tree planting projects in particular have been problematic. Critics point to a number of concerns. Trees reach maturity over a course of many decades. It is difficult to guarantee how long the forest will last. It may suffer clearing, burning, or mismanagement. Some tree-planting projects introduce fast-growing invasive species. These end up damaging native forests and reducing biodiversity. In response, some certification standards such as the Climate Community and Biodiversity Standard require multiple species plantings. Tree planting in high latitude forests may have a net warming effect on the Earth's climate because tree cover absorbs sunlight thus creating a warming effect that balances out their absorption of carbon dioxide. Tree-planting projects can also cause conflicts with local communities and Indigenous people if the project displaces or otherwise curtails their use of forest resources.

=== Changes in rainfall ===
As a consequence of reduced evapotranspiration, precipitation is also reduced. This implies having a hotter and drier climate, and a longer dry season. This change in climate has drastic ecological and global impacts including increases in severity and frequency of fires, and disruption in the pollination process that will likely spread beyond the area of deforestation. A 2025 study using statistical models to separate the effects of deforestation and global climate change across 29 areas in the Brazilian Legal Amazon estimated that deforestation accounted for approximately 74% of the decline in dry-season precipitation over 1985–2020. The study estimated a total decline of about 21 mm in dry-season precipitation over that period.

According to a study published in 2023, tropical deforestation has led to a significant decrease in the amount of observed precipitation. By the year 2100, researchers anticipate that deforestation in the Congo will diminish regional precipitation levels by up to 8-10%.

A 2025 study of 29 areas in the Brazilian Legal Amazon estimated that deforestation accounted for approximately 74% of the decline in dry season precipitation between 1985 and 2020.

=== Decreasing albedo ===
Deforestation changes the landscape and reflectivity of earth's surface, i.e. decreasing Albedo. This results in an increase in the absorption of light energy from the sun in the form of heat, enhancing global warming.

== Policies and programs to reduce deforestation ==
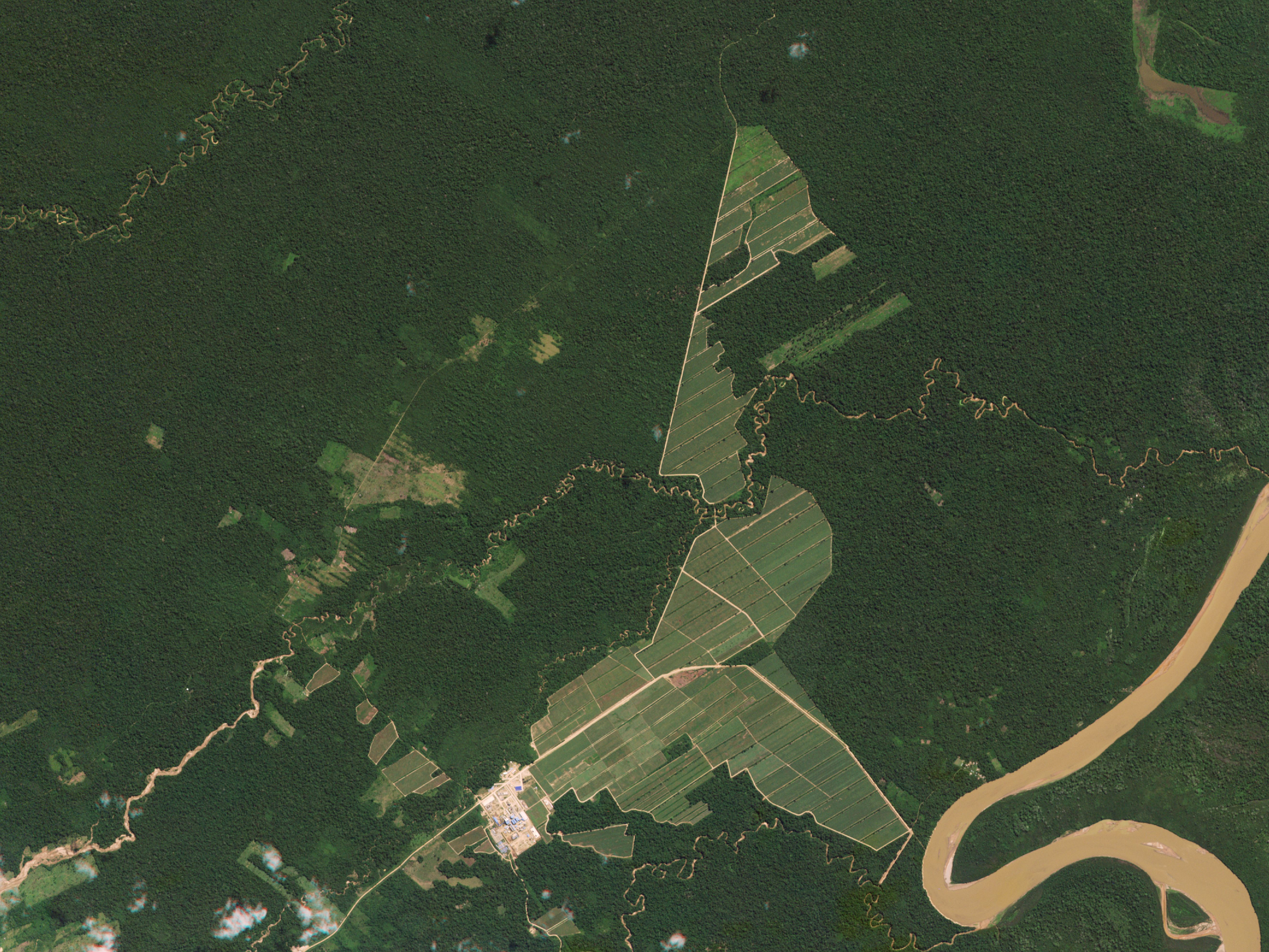
Deforestation in Bolivia

=== Reducing emissions from deforestation and forest degradation in developing countries ===
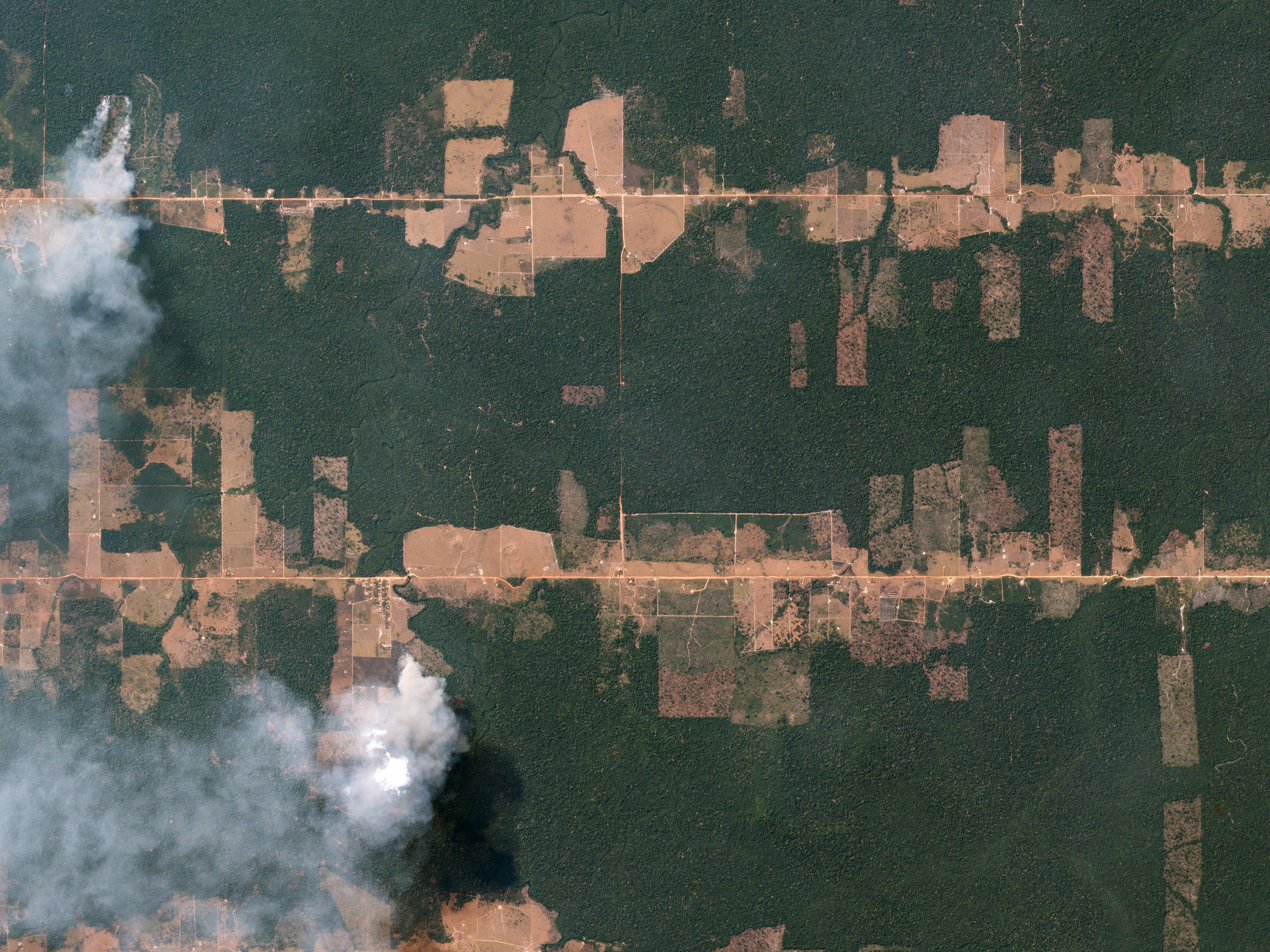
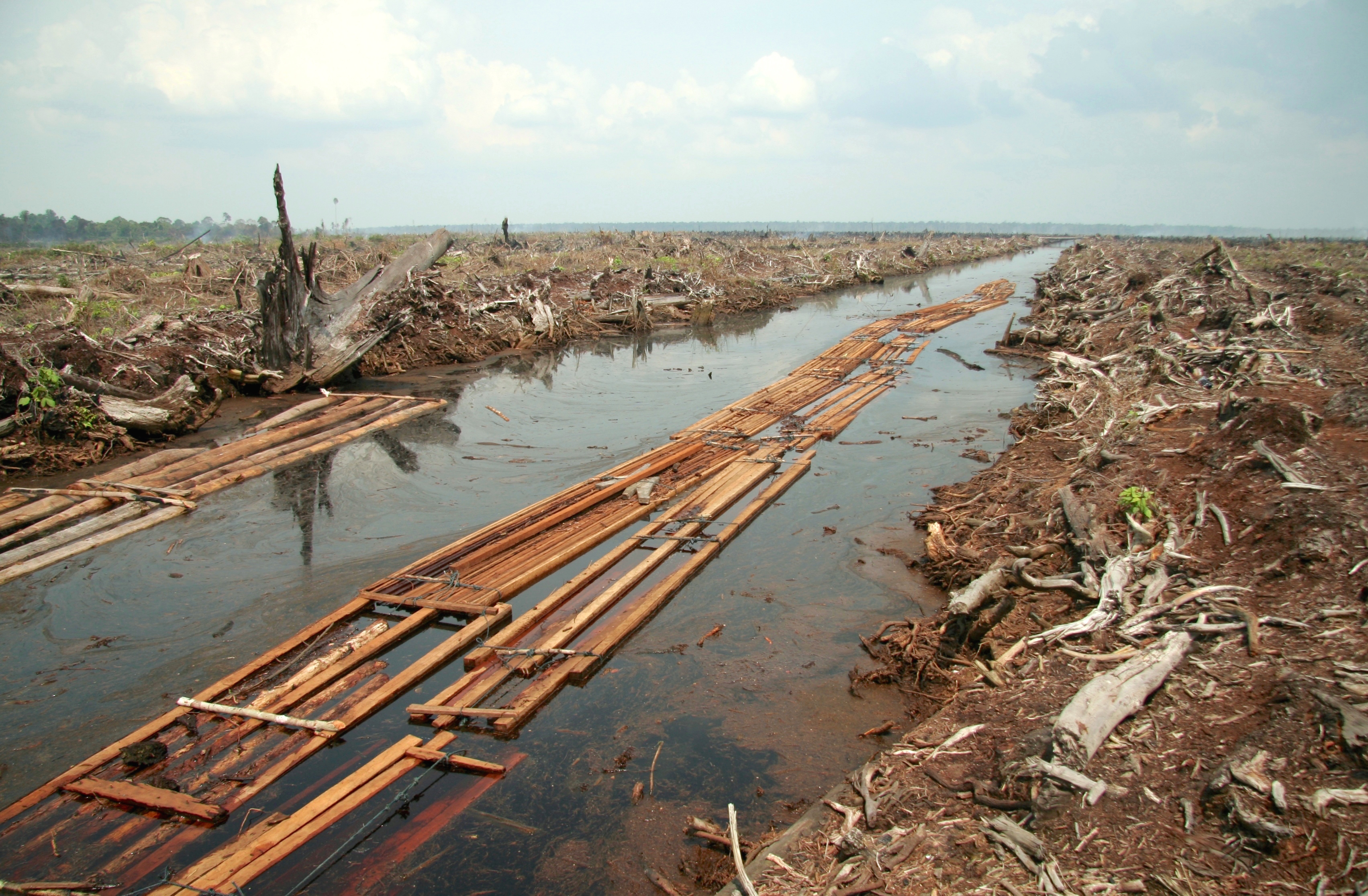
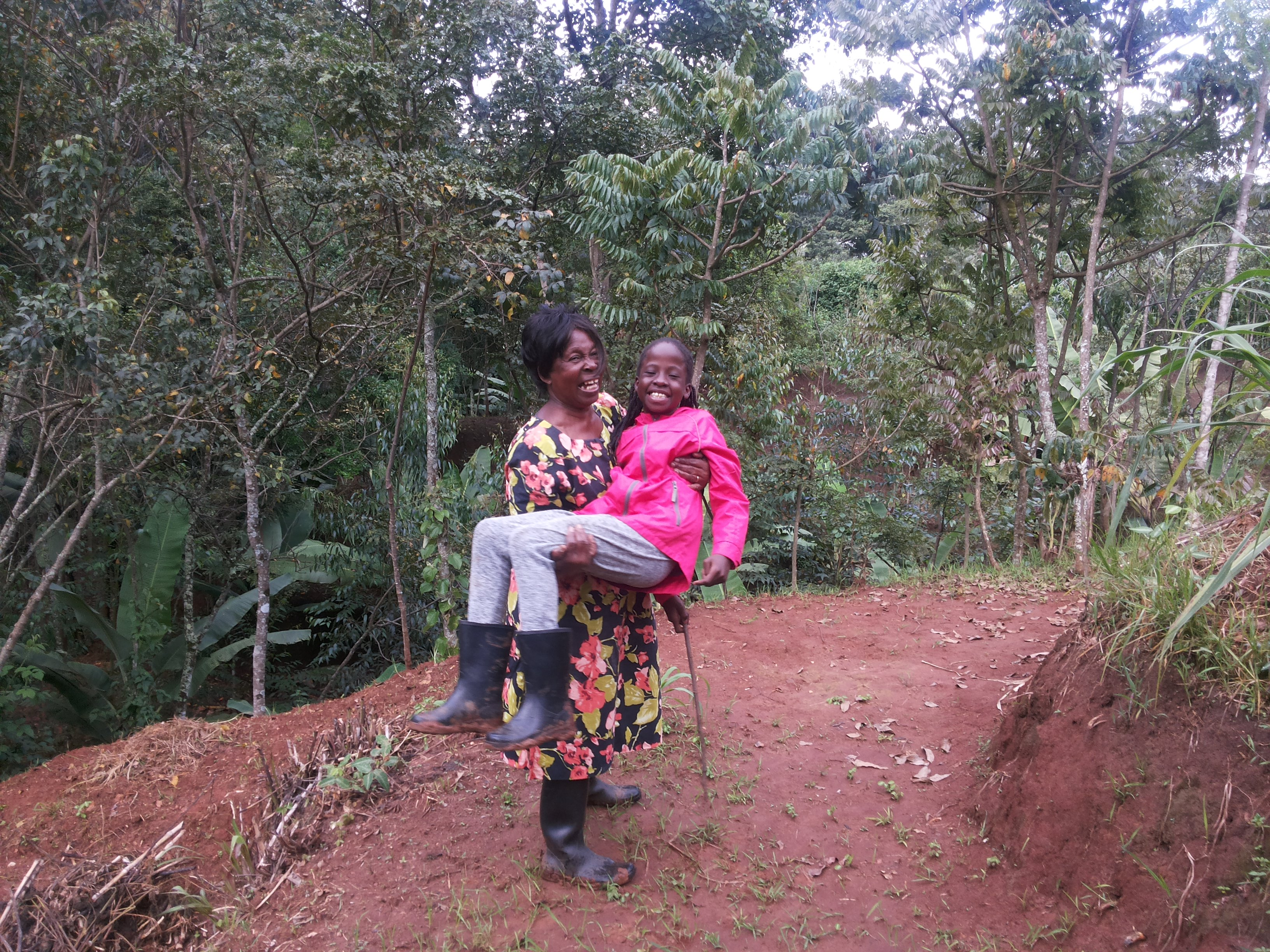
Examples of issues addressed by REDD+ in tropical forest landscapes: large-scale deforestation visible from space (top), conversion of carbon-rich peat forests for agriculture such as oil-palm (left), and community-based efforts to reduce forest degradation by creating income incentives for conservation (right).

REDD+ is a voluntary climate change mitigation framework developed under the United Nations Framework Convention on Climate Change (UNFCCC). It aims to encourage developing countries to reduce greenhouse gas emissions from deforestation and forest degradation, and to promote conservation, sustainable forest management, and enhancement of forest carbon stocks through financial incentives and policy support. The acronym is commonly expanded as "reducing emissions from deforestation and forest degradation in developing countries", and the "+" denotes the additional forest conservation and enhancement activities included in the UNFCCC scope.

UNFCCC decisions describe REDD+ as a phased approach, beginning with "readiness" activities (planning, capacity-building and institutional development), moving to implementation of national policies and measures, and evolving toward results-based actions that are fully measured, reported and verified. Countries undertaking REDD+ are expected to develop a national strategy or action plan, establish a forest reference (emission) level (FREL/FRL) as a benchmark for assessing performance, and build a national forest monitoring system to support monitoring, reporting and verification (MRV). UNFCCC decisions also include social and environmental safeguards (often referred to as the Cancún safeguards) and require countries seeking results-based payments to provide information on how safeguards are addressed and respected.

REDD+ is supported through a mix of multilateral and bilateral channels and can receive results-based finance when reported results meet UNFCCC methodological and transparency requirements under the Warsaw Framework on REDD-plus. A 2024 multi-country impact evaluation reported modest average forest outcomes and limited average welfare effects, with impacts not always sustained over time. Reviews and methodological assessments highlight uncertainties in baselines (reference levels), additionality, leakage, non-permanence and measurement capacity, especially for forest degradation and carbon pools that are harder to quantify. Criticisms and controversies also focus on governance and equity issues, including land tenure and carbon rights, benefit sharing, and the participation and consent of Indigenous peoples and local communities, alongside broader debates over the role of forest offsets in climate policy.

REDD+ remains an active part of the UNFCCC and Paris Agreement architecture. Most of the core UNFCCC decisions that define REDD+ were adopted between 2010 and 2015, including the Warsaw Framework on REDD-plus (2013). Countries continue to report REDD+ results through technical annexes to developing-country reports, including under the Paris Agreement's enhanced transparency framework via technical annexes to biennial transparency reports (BTRs). Results-based finance also continues through multilateral channels such as the Green Climate Fund's REDD+ results-based payments window.

=== The Bali Action Plan ===
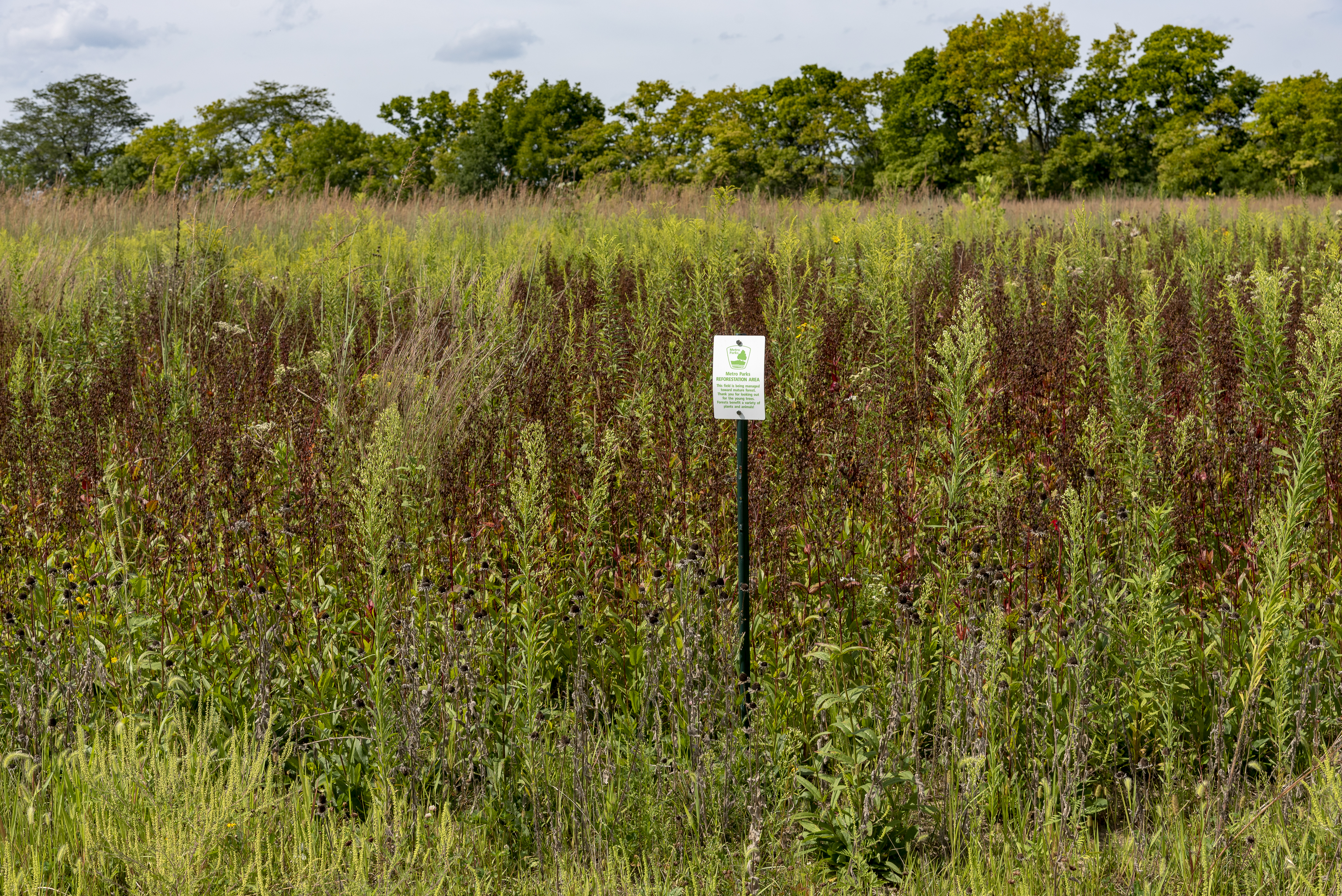
Scioto grove reforestation area

The Bali Action Plan was developed in December 2007 in Bali, Indonesia. It is a direct result of the Kyoto Protocol of December 1997. One of the key elements of The Bali Action Plan involves a concerted effort by the member countries of the Kyoto Protocol to enact and create policy approaches that incentivize emissions reduction caused by deforestation and forest degradation in the developing world. It emphasized the importance of sustainable forest management and conservation practices in mitigating climate change. This coupled with the increased attention to carbon emission stocks as a way to provide additional resource flows to the developing countries.

=== Trillion Tree Campaign ===
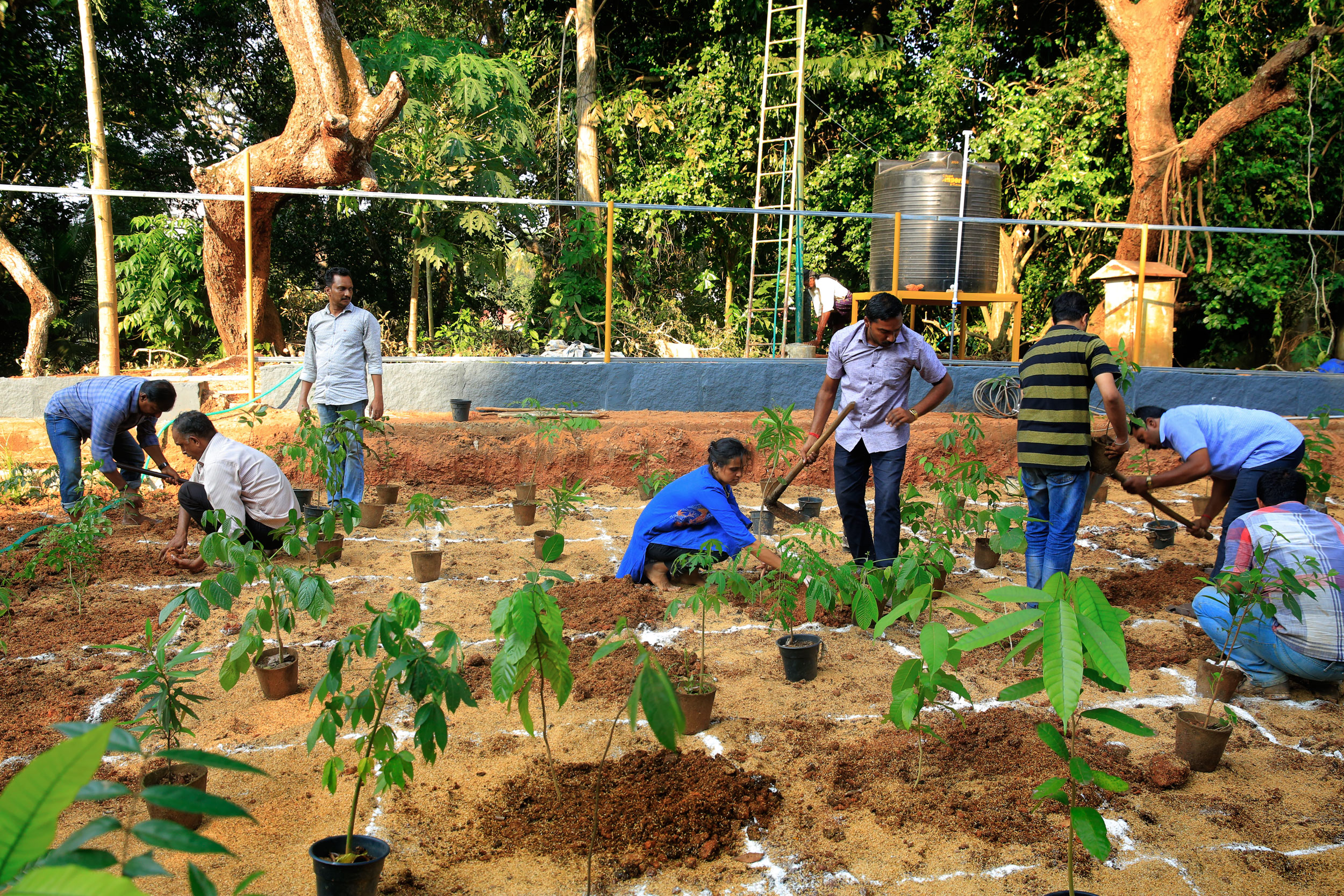
Afforestation at Kanakakunnu

The Billion Tree Campaign was launched in 2006 by the United Nations Environment Programme (UNEP) as a response to the challenges of climate change, as well as to a wider array of sustainability challenges, from water supply to biodiversity loss. Its initial target was the planting of one billion trees in 2007. Only one year later in 2008, the campaign's objective was raised to 7 billion trees—a target to be met by the climate change conference that was held in Copenhagen, Denmark in December 2009. Three months before the conference, the 7 billion planted trees mark had been surpassed. In December 2011, after more than 12 billion trees had been planted, UNEP formally handed management of the program over to the not-for-profit Plant-for-the-Planet initiative, based in Munich, Germany.

=== The Amazon Fund (Brazil) ===
Four-year plan to reduce in deforestation in the Amazon

The Amazon Fund (in Portuguese: Fundo Amazônia) is an initiative created by Brazil and managed by the National Bank for Economic and Social Development (BNDES). It was established on 1 August 2008, with the aim of attracting donations for non-reimbursable investments in actions for the prevention, monitoring, and combat of deforestation, and for the promotion of conservation and sustainable use of the Amazon rainforest. Additionally, the fund supports the development of monitoring and control systems for deforestation in the rest of Brazil and in other tropical countries.

The fund is used in various areas, including the management of public forests and protected areas, control, monitoring and environmental enforcement, sustainable forest management, economic activities developed from the sustainable use of the forest, ecological and economic zoning, land planning and regularization, conservation and sustainable use of biodiversity, and the recovery of deforested areas. The projects supported by the fund must be aligned with applicable public policies and the guidelines and criteria, in addition to demonstrating their direct or indirect contribution to the reduction of deforestation and forest degradation. The actions foreseen in the projects must be coherent with the proposed objective, with the budget and with the schedule of its implementation. Eligibility for accessing the Amazon Fund is determined based on compliance with several plans and criteria, including the PPCDAm (Action Plan for Prevention and Control of Deforestation in the Legal Amazon Region), ENREDD+ (National Strategy for REDD+), state plans for preventing and combating deforestation, and BNDES Operational Policies. Projects eligible for funding should directly or indirectly contribute to reducing deforestation in the Amazon. Various types of entities can submit projects for funding, including public administration bodies, NGOs, private companies, cooperatives, and research institutions.

Until 2018, the fund received R$ 3.4 billion in donations, with the majority coming from Norway, followed by Germany and Petrobras. Since 2023, several countries announced contributions to the fund or interest in contributing, including Germany, Norway, the United Kingdom, Switzerland, Denmark, France, Spain, Japan and others.

== See also ==
- Land use, land-use change, and forestry – Greenhouse gas inventory sector
- Special Report on Climate Change and Land – IPCC report
- Boreal forest of Canada – Biome characterized by coniferous forests
- Reducing emissions from deforestation and forest degradation – Climate change mitigation policy
- Natural Forest Standard – Voluntary carbon standard
