= Natural Forest Standard =

Voluntary carbon standard

The Natural Forest Standard (NFS) is a voluntary carbon standard designed specifically for medium- to large-scale REDD+ projects. The standard places equal emphasis on the combined carbon, social and biodiversity benefits of a project and requires a holistic approach to ensure compliance with the standards requirements and to achieve certification. The NFS applies a standardised risk-based approach to carbon quantification for consistent and comparable baseline calculations and aims to link local actions into national frameworks for reducing the loss of natural forests.

The NFS excludes commercial resource extraction and focuses on promoting the conservation of natural forests and the biodiversity and social values within them. The NFS requires projects to ensure no net loss of biodiversity and to establish an appropriate benefit distribution mechanism to deliver social benefits to communities within the project area. The NFS demands annual verification by independent third-party carbon auditors using the ISO14064-3 and ISO 14065 frameworks. The resulting certificates for fully verified projects are issued as Natural Capital Credits.

== History of the Standard ==
The NFS was developed in 2011 by Ecosystem Certification Organisation Ltd (ECO), a UK-based not-for-profit organisation, and Ecometrica, a sustainability and earth observation software company based in Edinburgh. The development process included engaging independent expert reviewers for comment and contribution to the standard requirements and methodology. The standard documentation was open for public consultation from 8 August to 12 October 2012 and again from 7 May to 31 July 2013.

== Natural Capital Credits ==
Natural Capital Credits (NCCs) are the carbon units generated by NFS projects and represent the combination of net positive environmental impacts achieved by the project. The carbon benefits are quantified using risk-based methodology; as such NCCs are denoted in tonnes of CO2e, however the term Natural Capital Credit more accurately reflects the combined values and benefits of the NFS approach.

== Methodology ==
The methodology adopted by the NFS is based on a standardised risk-based approach and is suitable for medium- to large-scale project application. The methodology NFS AM001, does not involve predicting land use changes in specific places at specific times, but applies a risk-based approach to baseline quantification which allows for a programmatic approach to reducing emissions. This allows efficient, valid and comparable results to be produced akin to performance benchmarking, where projects within a given region can use a consistent set of baseline data and accounting methods which provides a standardised approach to quantification of carbon benefits and is based on forest at risk and not a percentage or absolute rate of loss.

The methodology allows a combination of remote sensing and ground-based data as monitoring sources for monitoring the emissions from the project areas, with emphasis placed on satellite monitoring, such as PRODES for application in Amazonia.

== Verification requirements ==
The NFS requires that projects are independently, third-party validated and verified using ISO 14064-3 and ISO 14065 frameworks, carried out by industry-recognised, specialist VVB organisations. Projects achieve certification following successful completion of this verification process, and upon confirmation of the carbon assertions by the VVB, in compliance with the standard’s requirements.

== Normative Biodiversity Metric ==
The NFS requires project developers to use the Normative Biodiversity Metric (NBM) to assess the biodiversity within a project area. The NBM is a practical method of assessing the biodiversity value of a given area. The NBM is similar to the concepts of habitat hectares and mean species abundance.
