= List of road protests in the United Kingdom and Ireland =

This article lists individual current and past Road protests in the United Kingdom and in Ireland.

== Current protests ==
=== Lower Thames Crossing ===
Thames Crossing Action Group are campaigning against the proposed £8.2bn+ Lower Thames Crossing between Kent and Essex/Havering via Thurrock.

=== A27 Arundel Bypass ===
Stop the Arundel Bypass Alliance are campaigning against the proposed A27 Arundel Bypass in West Sussex.

=== A303 Stonehenge ===
Stonehenge Alliance are campaigning against the proposed A303 Stonehenge project.

=== A38 Derby Expansion ===
Stop the A38 Expansion group are campaigning against the proposed A38 road expansion in Derby.

=== A5036 Port of Liverpool Access ===
Save Rimrose Valley are campaigning against the proposed A5036 Port of Liverpool Access road scheme.

=== Bristol Metrobus M32 bus only bridge and junction ===
On 1 February 2015 the protest group 'RisingUp!' occupied land at Stapleton Allotments and Smallholdings, the planned site for a new motorway bus junction as part of the Bristol Metrobus North Fringe to Hengrove Project (NFHP). Building the junction and associated roads will result in a loss of Green Belt land, loss of long-held allotments (albeit with new laid plots being provided), and loss of smallholdings on some of the best soils in the country. The protesters claim that the junction is unnecessary and that buses could be routed via a suitably modified Junction 1 of the M32 at much less cost and with no loss of valuable growing land.

=== Central Access Scheme, Kilkenny, Ireland ===
Kilkenny Central Access Scheme (CAS), previously Kilkenny Inner Relief Road Scheme, is sections of new road, improvement of existing roads and junctions, and a new River Nore bridge crossing, with provisions for footpaths and cycle lanes throughout. CAS comprises 4.5 kilometers of single carriageway road that is 7.3 metres wide.

The proposed route dissects the medieval core of the old Irishtown of Kilkenny, one of the most historic quarters of the city.

The campaign group called "Complete Kilkenny Ring Road as a priority over the CAS" or CKRR is holding demonstrations to gain further support for a call to rethink the CAS and demand to complete the outer ring road around Kilkenny. Several of Kilkenny’s leading figures in the areas of tourism, heritage and archaeology – as well as local residents – have come out strongly against the imminent demolition of a number of historic buildings and the altering of one of the city’s oldest streetscapes.

The final phases of the scheme were opened in 2017.

=== A14 Ellington to Fen Ditton ===
The Highways Agency wished to increase capacity on the busy section of the A14 between Ellington and Fen Ditton. to reduce congestion and improve safety

The Offords A14 Action Group formed in 2007 to oppose the proposed route (the Orange route) for the scheme, favouring the Brown route which would have taken the new road further away from their villages. Cambridgeshire County Council have backed the scheme, and there is reported to be widespread support within the local communities for the plans.

=== A514 Swarkestone Causeway protest ===
During 2009 a protest group campaigning for a new causeway at Swarkestone, Derbyshire was established.

=== A57/A628 Mottram in Longdendale, Hollingworth and Tintwistle Bypass ===
The Highways Agency (HA) have planned to provide a section of bypass (also known as the Longdendale Bypass) to tackle congestions problems in Mottram, Hollingworth, and Tintwistle. and residents of these villages have campaigned for a bypass since the 1970s. Four groups: the Save Swallows Wood campaign, the Friends of the Peak District, the Council for the National Parks, and South Yorkshire group WAIT oppose the scheme, which will pass through the Peak District National Park, and the Swallows Wood nature reserve. In December 2007 the inquiry was adjourned for the fourth time at the request of the Highways Agency who requested time to adjust their correct their traffic modelling, the inspector commented that it was the fifth iteration of the traffic model since the original announcement in February 2006.

=== Boston Bypass ===
In May 2007 a single-issue political party, the Independent Bypass Group, campaigning for a bypass to be built around Boston, Lincolnshire, took control of Boston Borough Council.

=== Norwich Northern Distributor Road ===
A proposed road scheme to the north of Norwich linking the A1067 road and Norwich International Airport to the A47 has attracted opposition from both local and national groups.

=== Priory Park, Southend ===
Southend Borough Council wishes to build road to upgrade A1159/Priory Crescent in Southend in a dual carriageway.

The Camp Bling protest camp was established in 2005 and was still active in October 2008 and intending to stay in place until the road is scrapped. At a meeting with the council in April 2009 the authority told the protesters that the road widening scheme had been abandoned and the protesters agreed to leave.

=== Whaplode and Moulton bypass ===
In May 2007, the Spalding Guardian reported again that campaigners were calling for a bypass around the Lincolnshire villages of Whaplode and Moulton to be made a top priority. This call followed another fatal collision on the A151 road in Moulton. Measures which have already been taken on the road, including lower speed limits and speed cameras, haven't stopped the increasing death toll. The current campaign to have a bypass built started in 2002. In June 2004 the campaign group WRATH' (Whaplode Residents Against Traffic Horror) was launched to lobby for the bypass. In January 2005 WRATH submitted a proposed route for the bypass to Lincolnshire County Council. In July 2007, WRATH organised a three-mile (5 km) protest march through the villages to publicise their campaign. A Lincolnshire county councillor was reported to have said that there were twenty one other villages in Lincolnshire saying they had a need for a bypass.

=== Others ===
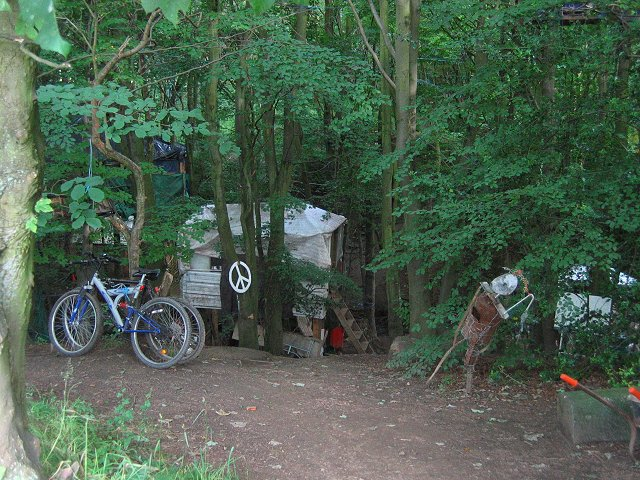
Road protest, Bilston Glen, Scotland

Other active protests include the ones against the following schemes: The South Bristol Link Road, Weymouth Relief Road, Bilston Glen, M6 widening, Bexhill to Hastings Link Road, Heysham to M6 Link, Kingskerswell Bypass, M1 Widening, Aberdeen Bypass, and the Westbury Bypass. In Ireland there is a protest opposed to bypassing the town of Slane with a new N2 dual carriageway which will pass a few kilometres from the Newgrange ancient monument.

== Past protests ==
=== 1979–1997 ===
General coverage of this time period can be found in Roads, Runways and Resistance (2021) by Steve Melia.

=== 1997–the present day ===
==== A66 Temple Sowerby bypass ====
The bypass around Temple Sowerby opened October 2007. The bypass aims to reduce traffic in the village by 95%. Locals had been calling for a bypass since the 1960s. In 1974 the government announced plans to build one, but these were abandoned in 1983. This was followed by years of increasingly vocal protests.

==== M74 Extension ====
Transport Scotland planned for some time to extend the M74 by five miles to link it to the M8. The M74 Extension, also known as 'M74 Completion' and 'M74 Northern Extension', extended the M74 northwards by 5 miles (8.0 km) through the south-eastern suburbs of Dalmarnock, Polmadie, Rutherglen, Govanhill and the Gorbals to meet the M8 near the Kingston Bridge in Glasgow on an elevated embankment. The Scottish Executive reported that the scheme will lead to a wealthier and fairer, healthier, safer and stronger, and greener future. However, JAM74, a coalition of community, environmental and sustainable transport groups, believed the scheme will be detrimental.

In May 2003, the Green and Socialist MSPs joined local campaigners to stop the project. A public inquiry for the scheme ran from December 2003 until March 2004 and the report, not published until March 2005 recommended against the building of the road, saying that it would "be very likely to have very serious undesirable results". The transport secretary at the time, Nicol Stephen, simultaneously announced that insufficient weight had been given to the economic benefits that the scheme would bring and that they would proceed with the scheme. Friends of the Earth Scotland said that it was "probably the worst environmental decision ever taken by the Scottish Executive" and that they would challenge the decision in court but then withdrew it in June 2006 on legal advice. In September 2004, the EU ruled that land on which the road was to be built should be classified as hazardous due to chromium dumps buried underground.

Construction work started in 2008, and the road opened on 28 June 2011. The extension involved the demolition of the Rosebery Park football ground.

== See also ==
- Road protest in the United Kingdom
