= Stop Climate Chaos Scotland =

UK Climate Change public body

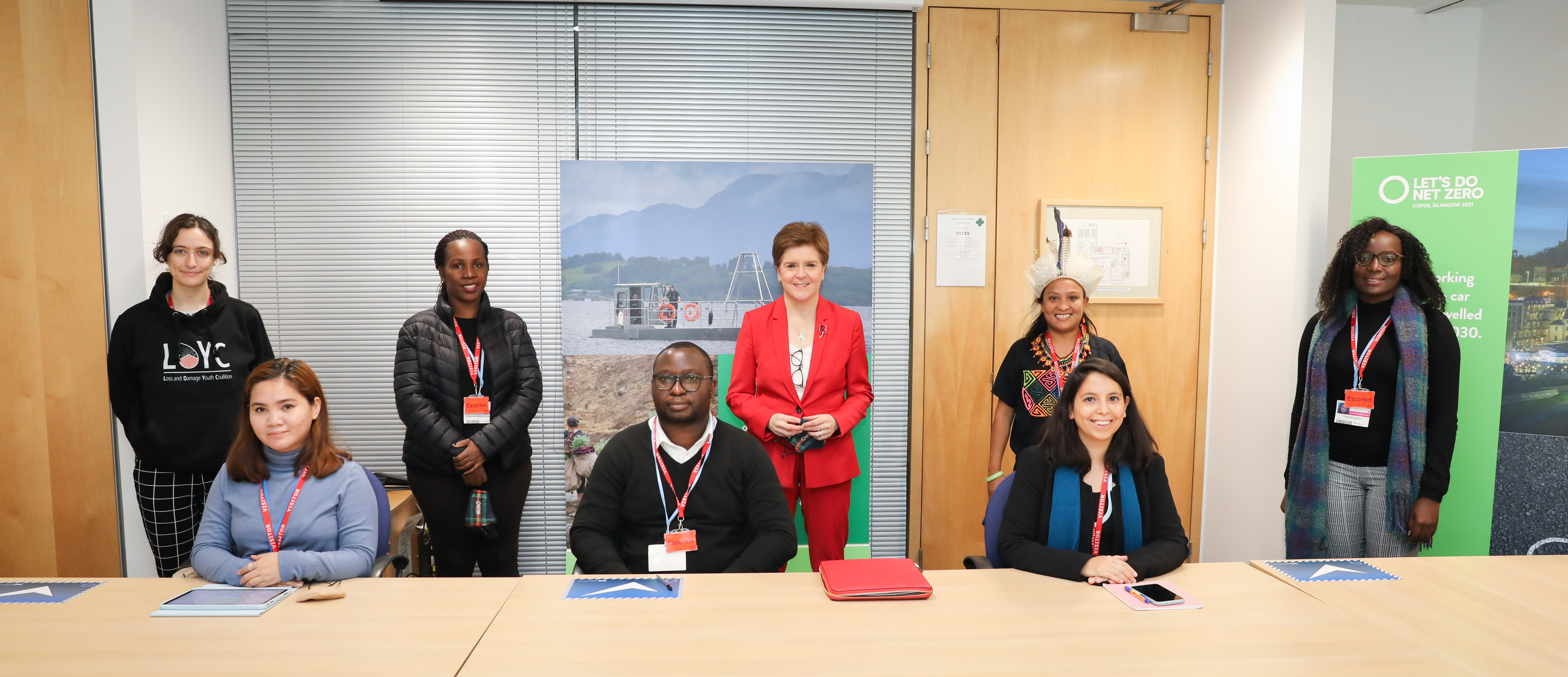
Nicola Sturgeon with representatives from Stop Climate Chaos Scotland in 2021

Stop Climate Chaos Scotland (SCCS) is a coalition of organisations in Scotland that are campaigning on climate change, including trade and student unions, environmental and international development organisations, faith and community groups. The coalition has close links with the Stop Climate Chaos coalition in London although it is a separately constituted organisation.

== Background ==
The organisation has a small staff team, and is overseen by an elected Board. The current chair is Tom Ballantine, a former lawyer. The previous chair was Mike Robinson, now Chief Executive of the Royal Scottish Geographical Society.

Stop Climate Chaos Scotland played a key role in the development of the Climate Change (Scotland) Act 2009, the strongest climate change legislation in the world. Stop Climate Chaos Scotland now works to ensure that the commitments set out in the Scottish Climate Change Act become a reality and that Scotland meets its targets to reduce emissions by 42% by 2020 and 80% by 2050. As Scotland’s own emissions account for only a relatively small percentage of the global total, SCCS is also working with civil society groups in other countries to promote the Scottish climate change example.

== Member organisations include ==
- ACTSA Scotland
- Airportwatch Scotland
- A Rocha Scotland
- Association for the Conservation of Energy
- Baldernock Community Council
- Changeworks
- Christian Aid in Scotland
- Church of Scotland
- Concern Worldwide
- Cycling and Touring Club Scotland
- Edinburgh University Students' Association
- Energy Agency
- Fife Diet
- Friends of the Earth Scotland
- Glasgow University Students' Representative Council
- Greenpeace
- Guildtown & Wolfhill Carbon Community Action Project
- Heriot-Watt University Students' Association
- Humanist Society Scotland
- Iona Community
- Justice and Peace Scotland
- Napier University Students' Association
- National Union of Students Scotland
- Oxfam in Scotland
- People and Planet
- RSPB Scotland
- SCIAF
- Scottish Episcopal Church
- Scottish Seabird Centre
- SCVO
- SEAD
- Spokes
- Sustrans
- Tearfund
- Transform Scotland
- Transition Linlithgow
- UKYCC
- UNISON Scotland
- WDM Scotland
- WWF Scotland

See also Stop Climate Chaos (UK) Members.

== See also ==
- I Count
- Stop Climate Chaos (UK)
