= Jess Pepper =

Scottish environmentalist

Jess Pepper FRSA FRSGS
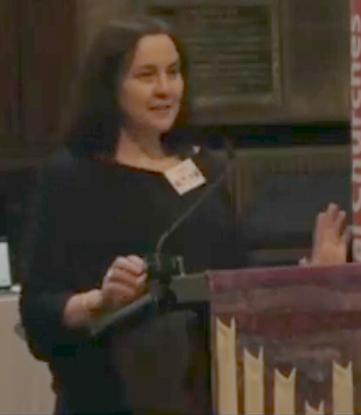
- Pepper in February 2025
- Born: Scotland
- Occupation: Environmentalist
- Employer(s): Scottish Environment Link; Stop Climate Chaos Scotland; WWF Scotland; Paths for All
- Organization(s): Royal Scottish Geographical Society; Royal Society of Arts
- Known for: Founder of the Climate Café initiative

Jess Pepper is a Scottish environmentalist, charity worker and founder of the Climate Café initiative. She is an honorary fellow of the Royal Scottish Geographical Society and a fellow of the Royal Society of Arts.

== Biography ==
Pepper is a Scottish environmentalist who was trained by Al Gore in Chicago, United States, in 2013.

In 2015, Pepper founded the Climate Café initiative, where people come together in a community-led safe space to drink, talk and act on climate change, at the Arts Centre in the village of Birnam, Perthshire, Scotland. As of 2024, there are 16 cafés in Scotland and a network of cafés around the world, which Pepper connects and supports.

Pepper has discussed tackling climate change with politicians including Member of the Scottish Parliament (MSP) John Swinney. Climate Café has also held pop-up cafés at the 2021 United Nations Climate Change Conference (COP26) in Glasgow and at the 2023 United Nations Climate Change Conference (COP28) in Dubai. In 2024, Pepper was the keynote speaker at The Church of Scotland's Eco-Congregation Scotland gathering in Stirling.

Pepper has previously worked for Scottish Environment Link, Stop Climate Chaos Scotland and WWF Scotland. She also led the #lovemybus programme for Transform Scotland. In October 2022, she became Director of the Board of Trustees of the Scottish charity Paths for All.

Pepper was named a BBC 100 Woman in 2023. She is an honorary fellow of the Royal Scottish Geographical Society and a fellow of the Royal Society of Arts.
