= Ashok Sinha =

British environmental campaigner (born 1964)

Ashok Sinha (born 8 November 1964) is a British environmental campaigner.

== Scientific and policy background ==
Sinha attended Ruckholt Manor Junior High School in Leyton, and then Tom Hood Comprehensive (now Buxton School), in Leytonstone. He studied physics at the University of Bristol and completed his PhD in renewable energy at Cambridge. Following this he spent a number of years pursuing research into climate change science at Reading University and Imperial College London, producing a variety of publications on climate feedback process. He then moved into policy analysis with Forum for the Future, working on climate change-renewable energy policy proposals, and then briefly for Solar Century.

== Advocacy ==
Ashok Sinha was one of the group of UK NGO activists who founded the UK Make Poverty History campaign, serving on its governing body, which he did whilst he was leading the Jubilee Debt Campaign.

In 2005 he became Director of the newly founded Stop Climate Chaos coalition (SCC), now called the Climate Coalition. SCC gained a high-profile with its I Count campaign (winner of two International Green Awards, 2007), which was the UK's campaign partner with the UK Live Earth event. SCC was also instrumental in helping to secure the UK's Climate Change Act 2008, helping to put a brake on the building of new unabated coal-fired power stations, and for delivering The Wave (ahead of the UN climate summit in Copenhagen) which was at the time the biggest single climate change campaign event ever held globally.

Following Stop Climate Chaos, Sinha became chief executive of the London Cycling Campaign, creating the sustainable transport charity's Love London, Go Dutch, Space for Cycling and Climate Safe Streets campaigns.

Sinha is currently CEO of the climate change solutions charity Ashden.

He was listed as one of the UK's top 100 Ethical Heroes by New Consumer magazine in 2007, one of the UK's top 100 environmentalists by the Independent on Sunday in 2008, and was listed annually as one of London's 1000 most influential people by the Evening Standard between 2012 and 2019.

== Other activities ==
Sinha is currently the chair of the London Sustainable Development Commission and a trustee of Friends of the Earth Charitable Trust. Amongst other voluntary roles, Sinha has also been a board member (and vice chair) of Amnesty International UK and of the London Cycling Campaign and a trustee of the Creekside Education Trust.
