= Global Day of Action =

Environmental direct action protest format

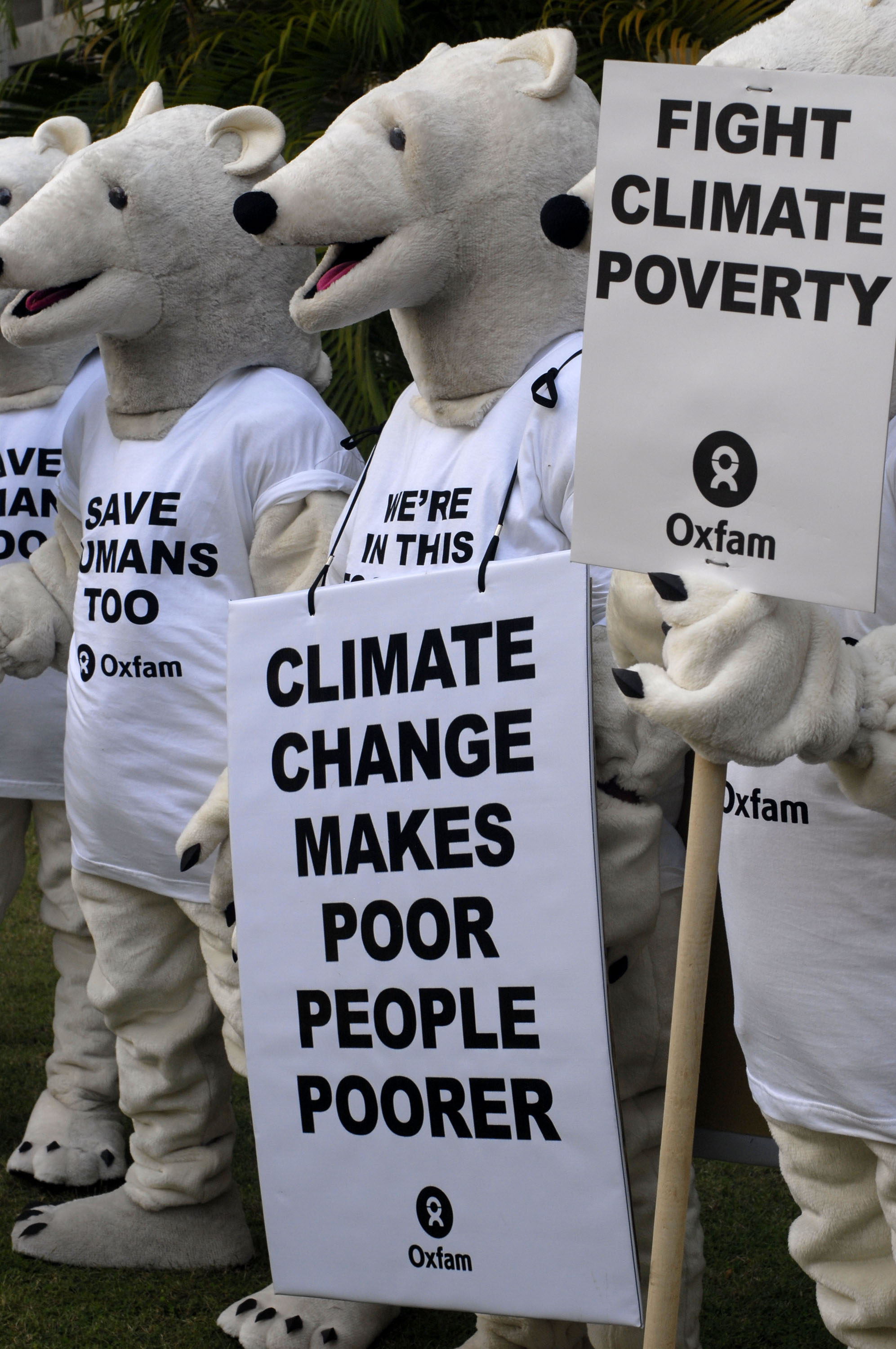
Oxfam protestors in Bali (Indonesia, 2007)

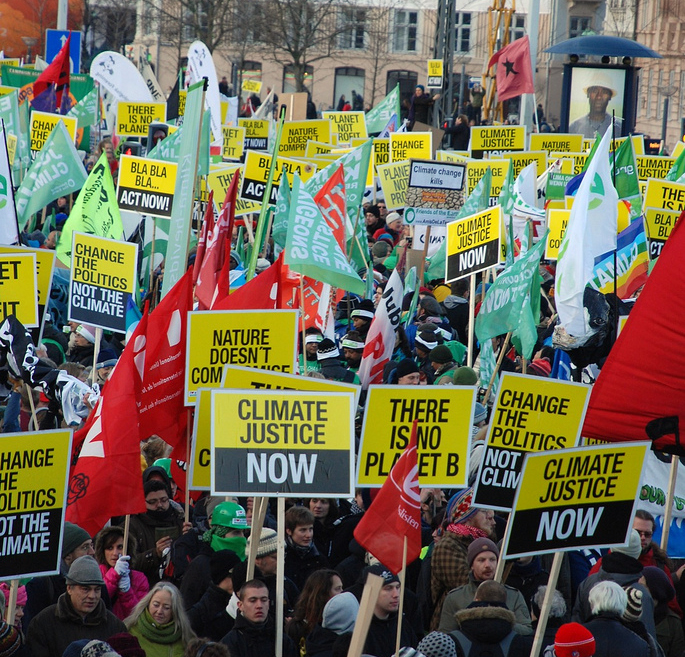
Tens of thousands of people marching in Copenhagen for climate justice (2009)

Global Day of Action is a direct action protest format. Environmentalism initiatives began to use it in 2005 in connection with Global Climate Campaign. They aimed to focus world attention on the anthropogenic effect that humans are having on global warming. Its main objective is to spearhead demands that elected representatives of their respective governments honor commitments set forth by the Kyoto Protocol, by conducting in unison peaceful demonstrations around the world. The demonstration, or rallies, are intended to coincide with the United Nations Framework Convention on Climate Change (UNFCCC), a meeting of world leaders from 189 nations, that meet annually to discuss climate change.

== History ==
=== 2018 ===
In 2018, Global Day of Action took place during Global Goals Week, an annual week-long event in September for action, awareness, and accountability for the Sustainable Development Goals.

=== 2007 ===
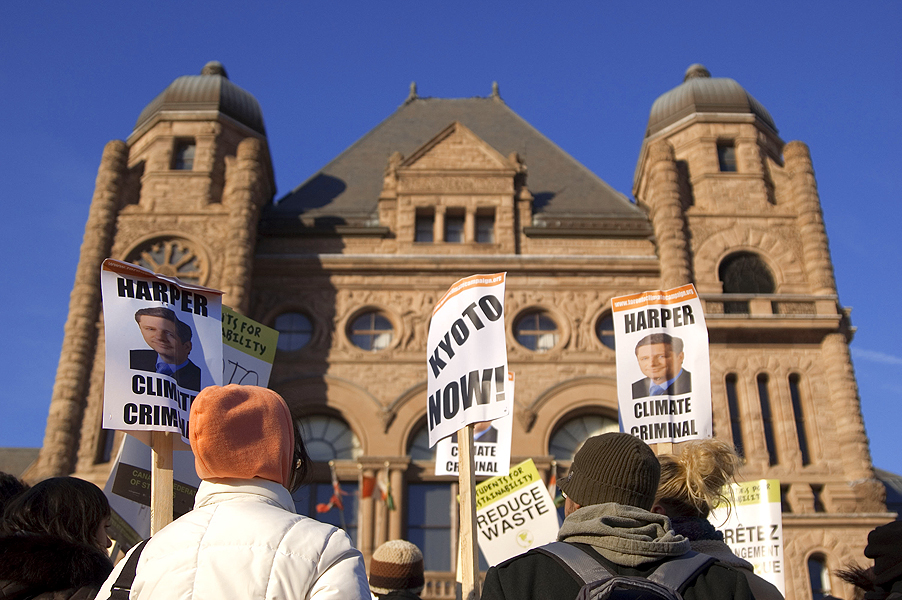
Protesters in Toronto, Canada

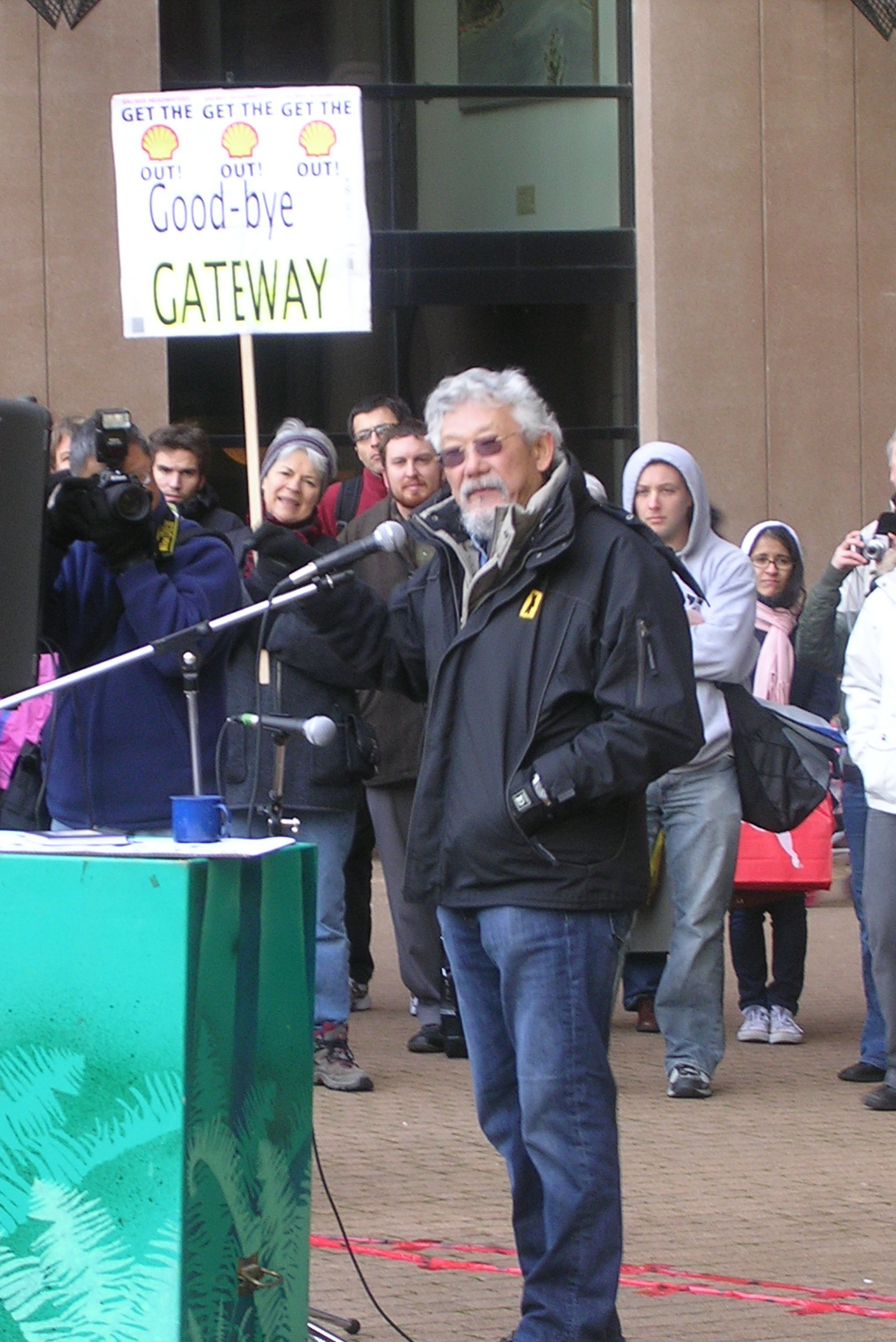
David Suzuki speaks at the 2007 event in Vancouver. The protester's sign denounces the Gateway Program.

The most recent Global Day of Action event, entitled Kyoto Now!, occurred on December 8, 2007 to coincide with the UNFCCC's conference, otherwise known as COP 13/MOP 3, convening Dec 3-14, 2007 in Bali, Indonesia. Numerous groups and coalitions, as well as independent grassroots efforts, were organized in over eighty countries worldwide to march in open rallies in support of this initiative. Chief among them was Campaign against Climate Change, Stop Climate Chaos and Greenpeace.

There were citizens in 84 countries - fifty more than the first year - participating in simultaneous rallies and marches around the world. Industrialized, G8 nations like Australia, Canada, France, Germany, Japan, Russia, UK, and USA had multiple rallies - 36 in Canada alone - being planned in cities nationwide.

In Athens, a Saturday demonstration featured music, juggling and stilt-walking acts, with traffic being interrupted around Syntagma Square by the 102 organizations taking part. In Taiwan, about 1,500 people marched through the streets holding banners and placards saying "No to carbon dioxide". Toronto activists also congested its main thoroughfare of Yonge Street, with an estimated 2000-3000 marchers, although another report estimated 500. Speaking at that event under a sunny sky, which began at Dundas Square (now Sankofa Square), was NDP federal party leader Jack Layton, and an impassioned and well received speech, in both French and English, by 12-year-old Misha Hamu. Elsewhere in Canada, a mock funeral was conducted in Edmonton, where black-clad protesters sang songs and gave eulogies over a long black coffin, and David Suzuki spoke at a rally in Vancouver.

In Bangalore, more than 1000 volunteers of Greenpeace descended on M. Chinnaswamy Stadium, dressed head to toe in yellow, holding up a large number of placards with climate messages, making human art formations and wearing fun masks. Greenpeace Southeast Asia, Thailand celebrated their event by releasing their new edition of Save the Climate Handbook at Chatuchak weekend market, which also featured a demonstration clinic on solar energy. In Istanbul there was over 7000 participants rallying under a clear blue sky.

In Berlin, German ice sculpture artist Christian Funk, carved a polar bear out of 15 tons of ice in front of the Brandenburg Gate on December 7, 2007, in honor of the protest. Measuring 4m x 4m x 1.5m, it was on display all the following day as it slowly melted. In London over 10,000 supporters turned out in the rain carrying placards denouncing a planned expansion at Heathrow Airport of a third runway.

Locations of demonstrations in 2007

1. Albania
2. Andorra
3. Argentina
4. Australia
5. Austria
6. Bangladesh
7. Belarus
8. Belgium
9. Benin
10. Bermuda
11. Bolivia
12. Brazil
13. Bulgaria
14. Burundi
15. Cameroon
16. Canada
17. Colombia
18. Congo (DR)
19. Costa Rica
20. Croatia
21. Czech Republic
22. Denmark
23. Egypt
24. Finland
25. France
26. Germany
27. Ghana
28. Greece
29. Guinea
30. Iceland
31. India
32. Indonesia
33. Ireland
34. Italy
35. Japan
36. Jordan
37. Kenya
38. Lebanon
39. Liberia
40. Macedonia
41. Malta
42. Mexico
43. Morocco
44. Nepal
45. Netherlands
46. New Caledonia
47. New Zealand
48. Nicaragua
49. Nigeria
50. Northern Ireland
51. Norway
52. Pakistan
53. Palestine
54. Panama
55. Paraguay
56. Philippines
57. Poland
58. Portugal
59. Puerto Rico
60. Romania
61. Russia
62. Scotland
63. Senegal
64. Serbia
65. Sierra Leone
66. Singapore
67. Slovenia
68. South Africa
69. South Korea
70. Spain
71. Sri Lanka
72. Sweden
73. Switzerland
74. Taiwan
75. Tanzania
76. Thailand
77. Togo
78. Turkey
79. Uganda
80. Ukraine
81. United Arab Emirates
82. United Kingdom
83. United States
84. Uruguay

=== 2005 ===
In response to entering into force of the Kyoto Protocol, following ratification by Russia, on February 16, 2005, Global Day of Action rallies were first conducted on December 3, 2005 to coincide with the UNFCCC's First Meeting of Parties to the Kyoto Protocol, or MOP 1, in Montreal, Quebec, Canada. The following year on November 3 and 11, 2006, rallies were conducted again when the UNFCCC convened for the Second Meeting of Parties, or MOP 2, in Nairobi, Kenya.

Locations of demonstrations in 2005

1. Sydney (Australia)
2. Bangladesh
3. Brazil
4. Sofia (Bulgaria)
5. Halifax (Canada) - organized by Zoë Caron, Co-author of Climate Change for Dummies, and Aliza Weller, Ecology Action Centre
6. Montreal (Canada)
7. Chile
8. Congo (Democratic Republic of)
9. Zagreb (Croatia)
10. Helsinki (Finland)
11. Paris (France)
12. Berlin (Germany)
13. Athens (Greece)
14. Dublin (Ireland)
15. Indonesia
16. Italy
17. Japan
18. Mexico
19. Wellington (New Zealand)
20. Nicaragua
21. Oslo (Norway)
22. Peru
23. Manila (Philippines)
24. Lisbon (Portugal)
25. Romania
26. Moscow (Russia)
27. South Africa
28. Barcelona (Spain)
29. Istanbul (Turkey)
30. Uganda
31. London (England)
32. Edinburgh (Scotland)
33. Belfast (Northern Ireland)
34. United States
35. Venezuela

=== 2024 ===
In early 2024, the Insure Our Future (IOF) campaign network organised a Global Week of Action (GWA) calling on the insurance industry to end its connections with fossil fuels. This was the first coordinated period of action against the insurance industry, and saw over 100 actions take place in 31 countries across the world from February 26th to March 3rd.

== See also ==
- Campaign against Climate Change
- An Inconvenient Truth
- Climate change
- Earth Day
- International Day of Climate Action
- Individual and political action on climate change
- World Environment Day
- Global day of action for the Iranian people
