= Campaign against Climate Change =

British pressure group

Campaign against Climate Change Logo

The Campaign against Climate Change (variously abbreviated to CCC or CaCC) is a UK-based pressure group that aims to raise public awareness of anthropogenic climate change through mobilising mass demonstrations. Founded in 2001 in response to President Bush's rejection of the Kyoto Protocol, the organization saw a steady increase in attendance on marches before a sudden take-off in interest between October - December 2005. An estimated 10,000 people attended a rally in London on 3 December 2005. The following year on 4 November 2006 the Campaign organised a march from the US Embassy to the iCount event in Trafalgar Square. At least 25,000 people gathered in Trafalgar Square that day making it easily the biggest demonstration on climate change in the UK to date, until The Wave march in December 2009.

The 3 December 2005 protests were not confined to the UK, but formed part of the first Global Day of Action on Climate Change, in which CCC played a key role in co-ordinating. The demonstrations, in more than 30 countries around the world, were timed to coincide with the crucial Montreal Climate talks in Canada, at which preliminary agreements were made for a post-Kyoto treaty to take effect after 2012. Outside Montreal itself, a crowd of between 25,000 – 40,000 gathered in a protest organised by the American-based Climate Crisis Coalition.

The December 2006 protests again had an international flavour, with the London, UK protest attracting 10,000 participants.

The Campaign against Climate Change has a network of local groups around the UK, which are currently in the process of being extended. On 9 February 2008 the Campaign against Climate Change hosted a Trade Union conference on climate change. Over 300 delegates attended and heard speakers, including several Trade Union general secretaries or their deputies, from most of the major British unions. This conference was followed by two more Trade Union events in 2009 and 2010. The campaign has also produced a report to a number of British Trade Union's on "One Million Climate Jobs". Arguing that direct government funding must be used to create jobs that can reduce Carbon emissions.

CCC is an example of a growing number of climate-related environmental pressure groups that have developed during the last decade, including organisations like Rising Tide, Climaction and the coalition group Stop Climate Chaos, of which the Campaign against Climate Change is a member.

CCC was heavily involved in the campaign against the closure of the Vestas Wind Turbine plant on the Isle of Wight and the occupation of the factory by the workers. The CCC was part of the mobilisations for the demonstrations that marked the United Nations talks on Climate Change in Copenhagen, in December 2009.

== See also ==
- Business action on climate change
- Camp for Climate Action
- Climate change in the United Kingdom
- Global Day of Action
- Individual and political action on climate change
- List of environmental protests
