= Individual action on climate change =

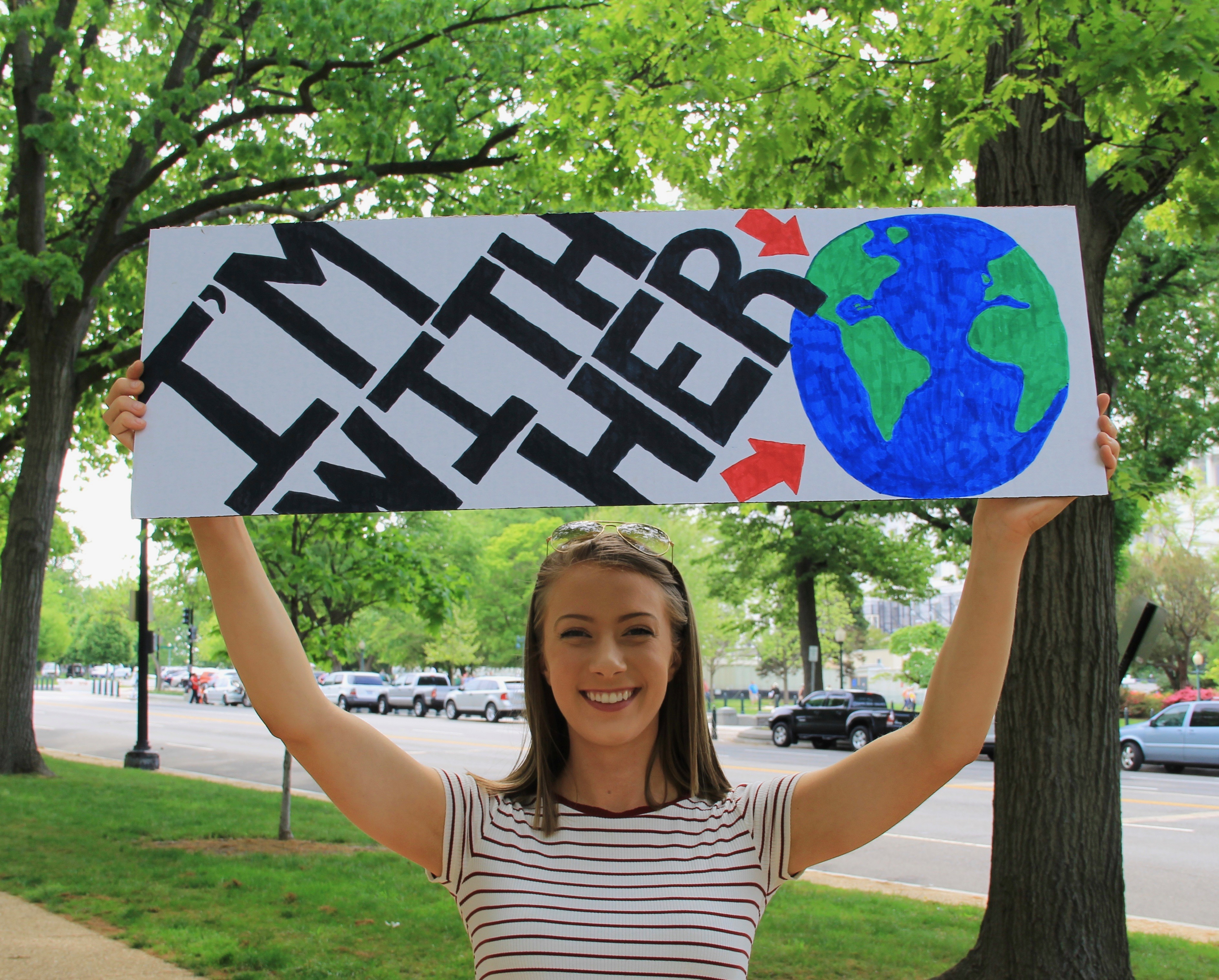
A demonstrator taking action through climate activism at the People's Climate March (2017) in Washington, D.C.

Individual action on climate change describes the personal choices that people can make to reduce the greenhouse gas emissions of their lifestyles and catalyze other climate actions. Individuals can focus directly on how choices create emissions, such as reducing consumption of meat or flying, or can focus more on inviting political action on climate or creating greater awareness of how society can become greener.

Excessive consumption is a significant contributor to climate change and other environmental issues, and in 2022 some said population increase is too. High consumption lifestyles have a significant environmental impact, with the richest 10% of people emitting about half the total lifestyle emissions. Creating changes in personal lifestyle, can change social and market conditions leading to less environmental impact. People who wish to reduce their carbon footprint (particularly those in high income countries with high consumption lifestyles), can for example reduce their air travel for holidays, use bicycles instead of cars on a daily basis, eat a plant-based diet, and use consumer products for longer. Avoiding meat and dairy products has been called the single biggest way individuals can reduce their environmental impact while implementing small changes in their daily lives.

Some commentators say that actions taken by individual consumers, such as adopting a sustainable lifestyle, are insignificant compared to actions on the political level. Others say that individual action does lead to collective action because "lifestyle change can build momentum for systemic change."

== Suggested individual target amount ==
Emissions of the richest 1% are more than twice that of the poorest 50%. Compliance with the Paris Agreement's 1.5°C goal would require the richest 1% to reduce emissions by at least 30 times, while per-person emissions of the poorest 50% could approximately triple.

Though total CO_{2} emissions (size of pie charts) differ substantially among high-emitting regions, the pattern of higher income classes emitting more than lower income classes is consistent across regions. The world's top 1% of emitters emit over 1000 times more than the bottom 1%.

Scaling the effect of wealth to the national level: richer (developed) countries emit more CO_{2} per person than poorer (developing) countries. Emissions are roughly proportional to GDP per person, though the rate of increase diminishes with average GDP/pp of about $10,000.

As of 2025, the remaining carbon budget for a two-thirds chance of staying below 2 degrees of warming is 900 bn tons of CO_{2} or 20 years at 2019 emission rates. Global average greenhouse gas per person per year in the mid 2020s was about 7 tons – including 0.7 tons CO_{2}eq food, 1.1 tons from the home, and 0.8 tons from transport. Of this about 5 tons was actual carbon dioxide. To meet the Paris Agreement target of under 2 degrees of warming by the end of the century, it was suggested in 2025 that each person should have a carbon footprint of 4 or 5 tonnes per year. Per capita emissions vary significantly within countries, with wealthier individuals creating more emissions. The wealthiest 10% of the global population are estimated to be responsible for two thirds of global warming. According to a 2021 report by the UN, the wealthiest 5% contributed nearly 40% of emissions growth from 1990 to 2015.

The IPCC Sixth Assessment Report pointed out in 2022: "To enhance well-being, people demand services and not primary energy and physical resources per se. Focusing on demand for services and the different social and political roles people play broadens the participation in climate action." The report explains that behavior, lifestyle, and cultural change have a high climate change mitigation potential in some sectors, particularly when complementing technological and structural change.

=== Meaning of "lifestyle carbon footprint" ===
The carbon footprint was originally coined and popularized by the ad campaign Beyond Petroleum in 2004–2006, funded by British Petroleum (BP), for which other have accused them of popularizing to downplay their own culpability.

A vast majority of people surveyed for the European Investment Bank Climate Survey say they are making efforts to reduce their contribution to climate change, but few are making radical lifestyle changes.

In 2008 the World Health Organization wrote that "Your 'carbon footprint' is a measure of the impact your activities have on the amount of carbon dioxide (CO_{2}) produced through the burning of fossil fuels". In 2019 the Institute for Global Environmental Strategies in Japan defined "lifestyle carbon footprint" as "GHG emissions directly emitted and indirectly induced from the final consumption of households, excluding those induced by government consumption and capital formation such as infrastructure." However an Oxfam and SEI study in 2020 estimated per capita CO_{2} emissions rather than CO_{2}-equivalent, and allocated all consumption emissions to individuals rather than just household consumption. According to a 2020 review many academic studies do not properly explain the scope of the "personal carbon footprint" they study.

== Travel and commuting ==
A comparison of travel options shows:

- Walking and running are among the least environmentally harmful modes of transportation.
- Cycling follows walking and running as having a low impact on the environment.
- Public transport such as electric buses, metro and electric trains generally emit less greenhouse gases than cars per passenger.

=== Walking and biking ===
Walking and biking emit little to no greenhouse gases and are healthy alternatives to driving or riding public transportation. There are also increasing numbers of bike-sharing services in urban environments, including ebikes. Walking or biking reduces CO₂ emissions by nearly 5%, and up to 9.5% if widely adopted in cities.

=== Public transport ===
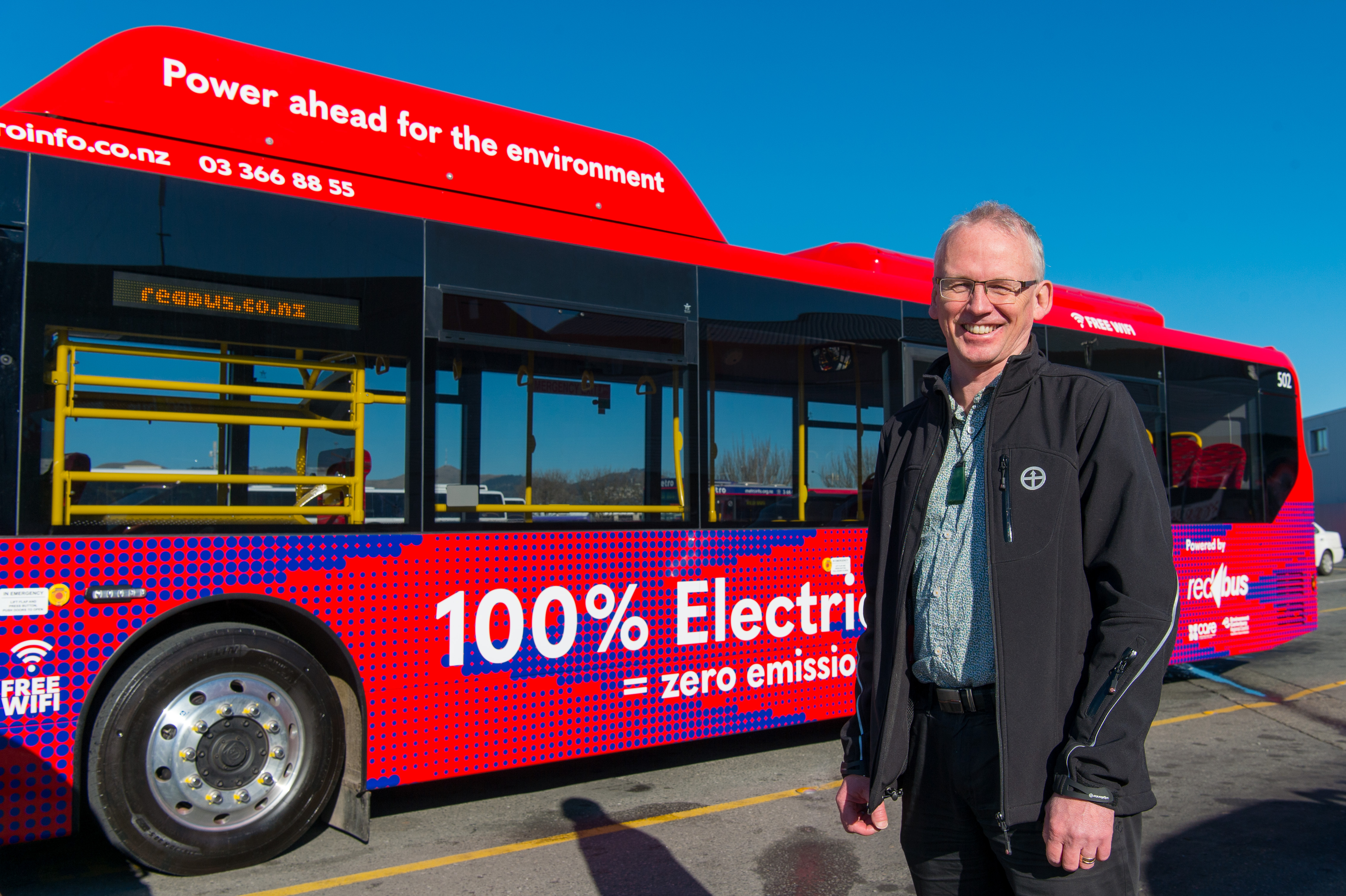
Battery electric bus

Reliable public transportation can be one of the most viable alternatives to driving personal vehicles. While there are efficiency problems associated with public transportation (waiting times, missed transfers, unreliable schedules, energy consumption), they can be improved as funding and public interest increases and technology advances. In the EU, only 13% of the total population do not plan on owning a vehicle at all.

=== Electric cars ===
There are many options to choose from when considering alternatives to personal car use, but the use of a personal vehicle may be necessary due to location and accessibility reasons. The life cycle assessment of a vehicle evaluates the environmental impact of the production of the vehicle and its spare parts, the fuel consumption of the vehicle, and what happens to the vehicle at the end of its lifespan. These environmental impacts can be measured in greenhouse gas emissions, solid waste produced, and consumption of energy resources among other factors. Increasingly common alternatives to internal-combustion engines vehicles are electric vehicles (EVs), and hybrid-electric vehicles.

A 2022 survey found that 33% of car buyers in Europe will opt for a petrol or diesel car when purchasing a new vehicle. 67% of the respondents mentioned opting for the hybrid or electric version. Most Chinese car buyers choose hybrid or electric.

=== Carpooling and ride-sharing services ===
Carpooling and ride-sharing services are also alternatives to personal transportation. Carpooling reduces the number of cars on the road, in turn reducing the amount of traffic and energy consumption. There are more vehicles on the road as a result of passengers who would have otherwise taken public transportation, walked, or biked to their destination. Car ride-sharing services like Uber and Lyft can reduce emissions if they implement strategies like electrifying vehicles and increase carpooling trips.

=== Air transport ===
Air travel is one of the most emission-intensive modes of transportation. The current most effective way to reduce personal emissions from air travel is to fly less. New technologies are being developed to allow for more efficient fuel consumption and planes powered by electricity.

Avoiding air travel and particularly frequent flyer programs has a high benefit because the convenience makes frequent, long-distance travel easy, and high-altitude emissions are more potent for the climate than the same emissions made at ground level. Aviation is much more difficult to fix technically than surface transport, so will need more individual action in future if the Carbon Offsetting and Reduction Scheme for International Aviation cannot be made to work properly. Some airlines give leisure customers an option to buy SAF when they buy their tickets but the ICCT says this is probably only effective in Europe.

Flying is responsible for 5 percent of global warming. Compared to longer flight routes, shorter flights actually produce larger amounts of greenhouse gas emissions per passenger they carry and mile covered, so individuals may consider train travel instead but this can be more expensive due to aviation subsidies. Airplanes contribute to damaging our environment since airplanes cause greater air pollution as they release carbon dioxide along with nitrogen oxides, which is an atmospheric pollutant. Exhaust emissions lead to changes in the amounts of the greenhouse gases ozone and methane. Avoiding night-flights may help, as contrails may account for over half of aviation's climate change impact.

Climate change is a factor that 67% of Europeans consider when choosing where to go on holiday. 52% of Europeans, specifically 37% of people ages 30–64 and 25% of people aged above 65, state that in 2022 they will choose to travel by plane. 27% of young people claim they will travel to a faraway destination. More specifically, people under the age of 30 are more likely to consider climate implications of vacation spots and air travel.

== Home energy and landscaping ==
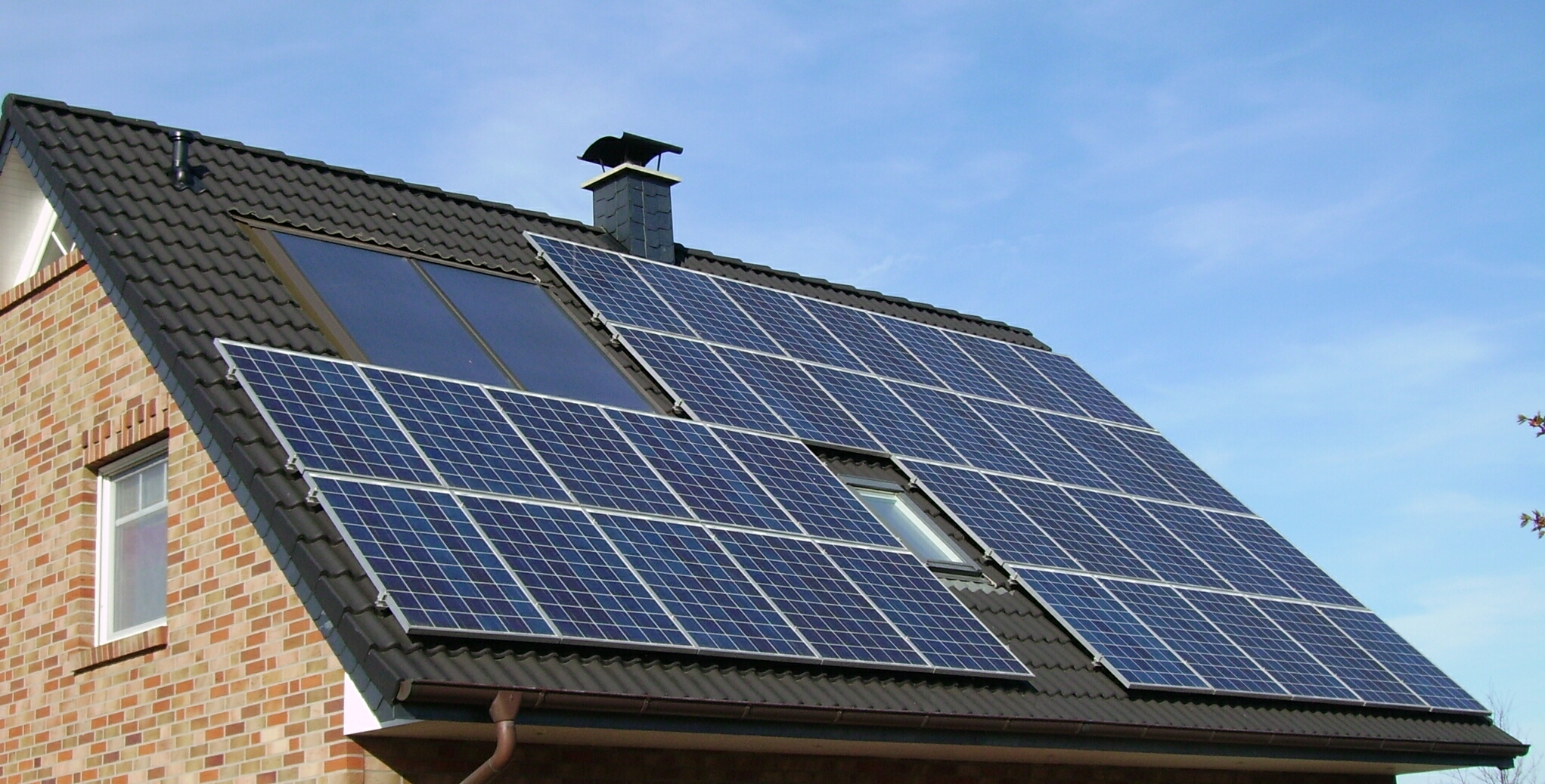
Solar panels on roof of a home to generate energy from a renewable energy source.

Reducing home energy use through measures such as insulation, better energy efficiency of appliances, cool roofs, heat reflective paints, lowering water heater temperature, and improving heating and cooling efficiency can significantly reduce an individual's carbon footprint. After home insulation and ventilation has been checked, replacing a failed gas boiler with a heat pump makes a considerable difference, especially in climates where both heating and cooling are required.

Installing rooftop solar, both on a household and community scale, also reduces household emissions, and at scale could be a major contributor to greenhouse gas abatement. Home batteries can help by reducing the use of gas-fired peaking power plants.

In addition, the choice of energy used to heat, cool, and power homes makes a difference in the carbon footprint of individual homes. Many energy suppliers in various countries worldwide have options to purchase part or pure "green energy" (usually electricity but occasionally also gas). These methods of energy production emit almost no greenhouse gases once they are up and running

Switching to energy-efficient behavior can cut household electricity use by up to 30%, reducing over 300 kg of CO₂ emissions per year per home.

=== Low energy products and consumption ===
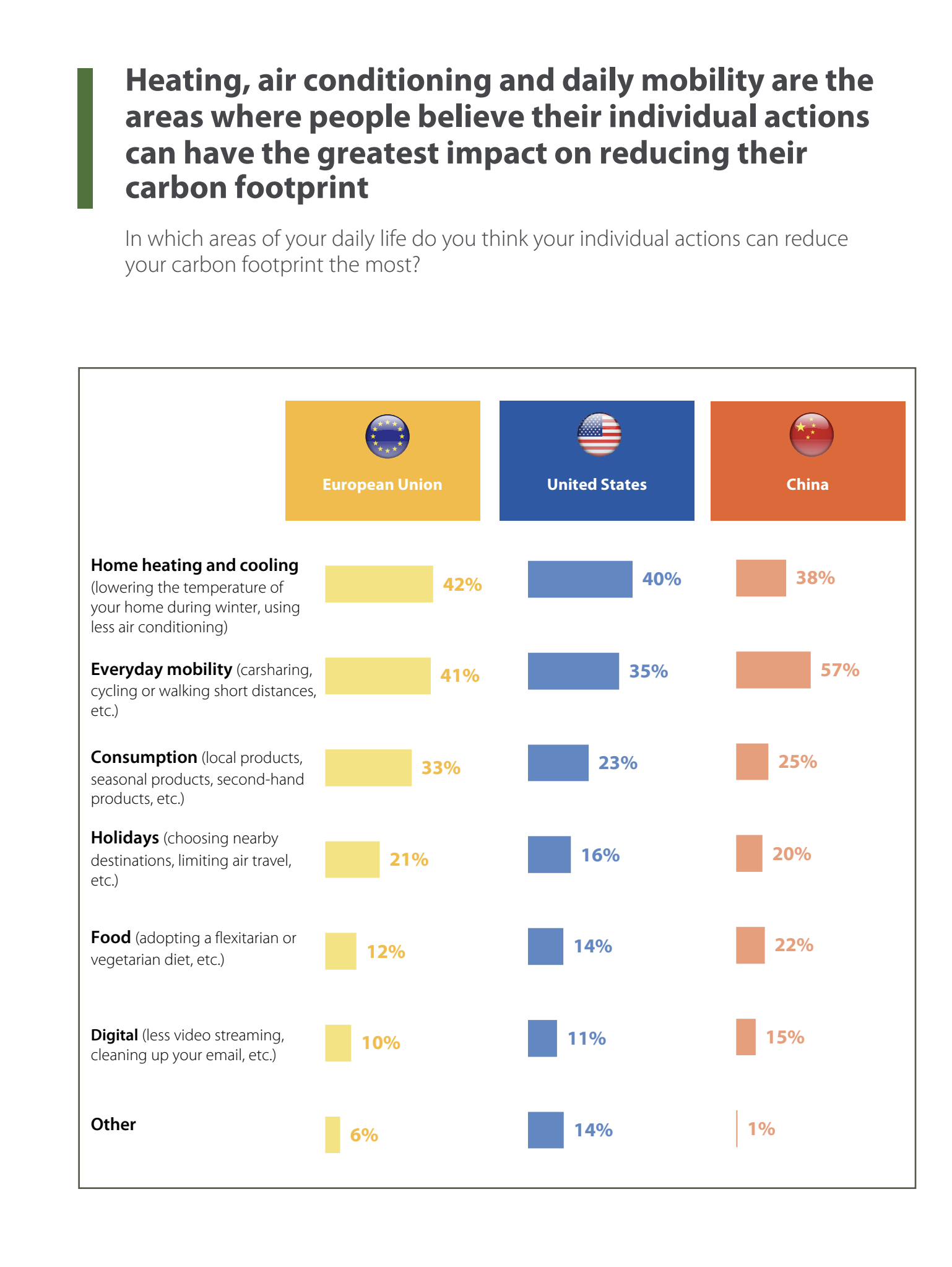
Survey showing that heating, air conditioning and daily mobility are the areas where people believe their individual actions can have the greatest impact on reducing their carbon footprint.

Labels, such as Energy Star in the US, can be seen on many household appliances, home electronics, office equipment, heating and cooling equipment, windows, residential light fixtures, and other products. Energy star is a program in the U.S. that promotes energy efficiency. When buying air conditioning the choice of coolant is important.

Carbon emission labels describe the carbon dioxide emissions created as a by-product of manufacturing, transporting, or disposing of a consumer product. Environmental Product Declarations (EPD) "present transparent, verified and comparable information about the life-cycle environmental impact of products". These labels may help consumers choose lower energy products.

Converting appliances such as stoves, water heaters and furnaces from gas to electric reduces emissions of CO_{2} and methane.

=== Landscape and gardens ===
Plants process carbon dioxide to make organic molecules like cellulose, sugars, starches, plant proteins, and oils. Perennials keep a large proportion of those organic molecules for as long as they live, not releasing them until microorganisms decompose them after they die. Perennial plants like trees and shrubs contribute to the absorption of carbon dioxide from the air.

Annual plants that die each year release almost all of the CO_{2} that they take in. Grass lawns that live over the winter but die back above ground can also soak up a share of carbon dioxide, reducing that greenhouse gas in the atmosphere. However, both organic and synthetic fertilizers are sources of NO_{x}, and turfgrass lawns use 3 million tons of nitrogen-based fertilizer each year. That adds four to five tons of carbon to the atmosphere for every ton of nitrogen (660,000 tons of carbon dioxide/year). NO_{x} is about 300 times more heat-absorbing than carbon dioxide.

Soil microbes break down organic carbon into carbon dioxide. Reducing irrigation would slow the microbial activity of the soil and its production of carbon dioxide. However, increased irrigation is required for lawn maintenance in areas that are becoming more arid due to climate change. Gas-powered lawnmowers and other power tools used for lawn maintenance produce carbon dioxide and methane, which are greenhouse gases.

Lawns management methods like fertilizers and fossil fuel-powered lawn equipment may outweigh any carbon sequestration from the perennial grass lawn. Reducing irrigation, nitrogen fertilizer, chemical pesticides, and using hand tools instead of power tools that use fossil fuels can all reduce the climate impact of lawns.

Natural lawns promote pollination, require no fertilization, require less frequent mowing, promote diversity, and use less water. There are many opportunities to plant trees and shrubs in the yard, along roads, in parks, and in public gardens. In addition, some charities plant fast-growing trees to help people in places with less tree coverage to restore the productivity of their lands. Individuals can also plant home vegetable gardens that provide locally grown food, native plant gardens that provide a diversity of species, and trees and perennial shrubs that develop sustainable carbon sequestration.

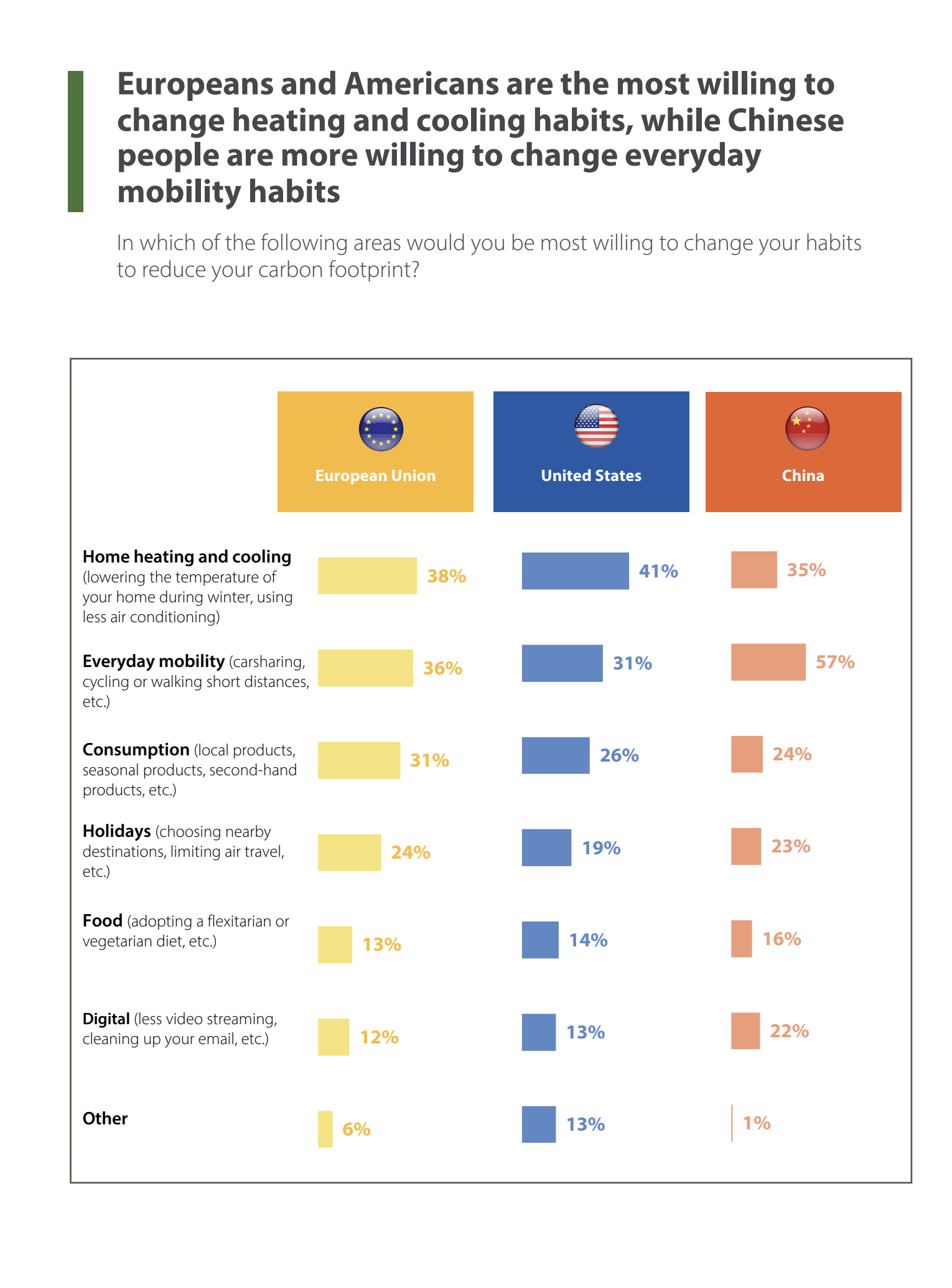
European and American respondents to a survey in 2022 are found the most willing to change heating and cooling habits, while Chinese people are more willing to change everyday mobility habits.

=== Laundry and buying clothes ===
Purchasing well-made, durable clothing, and avoiding "fast fashion" reduces climate impact, because polyester production emits carbon dioxide via its ingredient ethylene production. In states with high-carbon electricity (Note: states with a high share of coal-fired power stations such as Poland - see https://app.electricitymaps.com) clothing's carbon footprint can be reduced by using a shorter cold water wash cycle and hanging laundry to dry.

=== Hot water consumption ===
Domestic heated water using non-renewable resources such as gas contributes to significant global carbon dioxide emissions. As of 2020, most homes use gas or electric boilers to heat their water. Powering these boilers with renewable energy would reduce these emissions, although the cost of installation means this is not a universally viable option. Turning off the water heater and using unheated water for laundry, bathing (weather permitting), dishes, and cleaning eliminates those emissions.

== At work ==
Some professionals can influence the companies they work for.

== Demand reduction ==
=== Less consumption of goods and services ===
The production of many goods and services results in the emission of greenhouse gases as well as pollution. One way for individuals to decrease their environmental footprint is by consuming less goods and services. Decreasing the consumption of goods and services results in a lower demand, and lower supply (production) follows. Individuals can prioritize shrinking the consumption of those goods and services whose production results in relatively high pollution levels. Individuals can also prioritize discontinuing the use of those goods and services that offer little to no real utility by "speaking with their money", since unpopular products neither satisfy consumer wants/needs nor the environment's; however, government subsidies may prove "boycott buying" to be futile in some cases, enabling the producer.

A climate survey found that in 2021 42% of Europeans, specifically 48% of women and 34% of men, already invest in second-hand clothing rather than buying new ones. Populations aged 15 to 29, are found more likely to do so. Education on sustainable consumption, specifically targeting children, is seen as a priority by 93% of Chinese citizens, 92% of EU, 88% of British citizens and 81% of Americans.

The National Geographic Society has concluded that city dwellers can help with climate change if they (or we) simply "buy less stuff".

Lloyd Alter suggests that one way to get a practical sense of embodied carbon is to ask, "How much does your household weigh?"

For-profit companies usually promote and market their products as useful or needed to potential consumers, even when they in reality are harmful or wasteful to them and/or the environment. Individuals should be diligent in self-assessing and/or researching whether or not each product they purchase and consume is really of value to decrease consumption. If a gas stove or other type of stove needs to be replaced in a new house, then an electric stove is preferable. However, as cooking is usually a small part of household GHG emissions, it is generally not worth changing a stove simply for climate reasons.

Using durable, reusable containers, such as lunchboxes, grocery and produce bags, and Tupperware; as well as choosing local produce and minimally packaged goods, can help lower carbon emissions and pollution associated with producing and transporting single-use packaging. These practices reduce greenhouse gas emissions by decreasing the demand for excess packaging and long-distance shipping.

=== Reducing food loss ===
The world's food production is responsible for approximately a quarter of the greenhouse gas emissions produced by humanity each year, with livestock alone accounting for 14.5% of the total greenhouse gas emissions. The carbon dioxide emissions associated with food are estimated to be 2.2 tons per person annually, from production to consumption. If this is correct, it would mean that just the food aspect of daily life would nearly exhaust the entire Paris Agreement compliance goal of 2.3 tons per person per year. Therefore, reducing food loss is absolutely essential, and in the 2020 Project Drawdown, it was identified as the top priority solution to address climate change. Fortunately, out of the 2.2 tons mentioned, 1.9 tons are considered reducible.

According to a 2023 study published in Nature Food, carbon dioxide emissions resulting from food waste make up half of the total emissions in the entire food system. In the United States, it is estimated that 31% of food delivered to retail stores is discarded by either retailers or consumers. Furthermore, the carbon dioxide emissions from food waste that decomposes in landfills, etc., amount to 2.5 kilograms of carbon dioxide per kilogram of food and also produce methane, a greenhouse gas with 25 times the warming potential of carbon dioxide.

Food waste also represents a loss of the energy to transport foods from producers to consumers. According to a study published in Nature Food in 2022, transportation-related emissions for food from producers to retail stores represent around 20% of the total emissions for vegetables and fruits, while for refrigerated transport of items like meat, fresh fish, and dairy, it increases by an additional 20–30%.

In addition to the waste of food itself, the disposal of packaging materials is also a significant concern. Reducing food waste contributes to reducing both global warming and environmental pollution caused by plastic packaging materials. It is estimated that approximately 5% of the energy used to manufacture and distribute food products is attributed to packaging materials. Plastic food packaging materials are known for their significant environmental pollution, therefore they contribute not only to carbon dioxide emissions associated with plastic production but also to overall adverse environmental impacts. Japan's excessive packaging culture in the context of food, has been criticized internationally in relation to Japanese plastic waste.

=== Eating a plant-rich diet ===
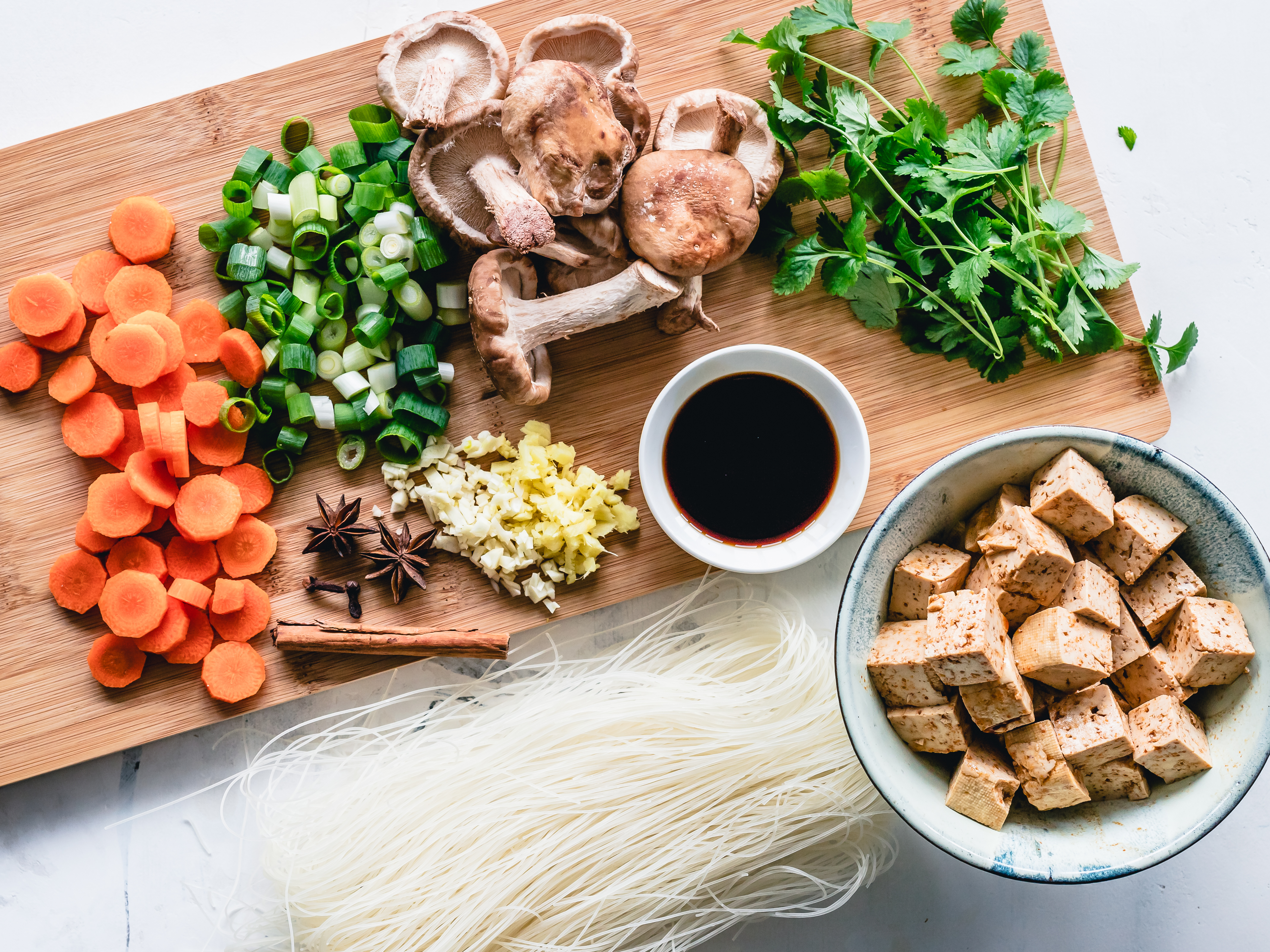
Example of a low-carbon dish: Vegan pho ingredients.

The world's food system is responsible for about ¼ of the planet-warming greenhouse gases that humans generate each year with the livestock sector alone contributing 14.5% of all anthropogenic GHG emissions.

The 2019 World Scientists' Warning of a Climate Emergency, endorsed by over 11,000 scientists from more than 150 countries, stated that "eating mostly plant-based foods while reducing the global consumption of animal products, especially ruminant livestock, can improve human health and significantly lower GHG emissions." The most common ruminant livestock are cattle and sheep.

Since agriculture is very difficult to fix technically, more individual action is needed. Switching to plant-based meals can reduce diet-related greenhouse gas emissions by up to 49%.

Eating less meat, especially beef and lamb, reduces emissions. A diet which is part of individual action on climate change is also good for health, averaging less than 15 g (about half an ounce) of red meat and 250 g dairy (about one glass of milk) per day. The World Health Organization recommends trans-fats make up less than 1% of total energy intake: ruminant trans-fats are found in beef, lamb, milk and cheese. The Special Report on Climate Change and Land says that a shift towards plant-based diets would help to mitigate and adapt to climate change. Ecologist Hans-Otto Pörtner, who contributed to the report, said "We don't want to tell people what to eat, but it would indeed be beneficial, for both climate and human health, if people in many rich countries consumed less meat, and if politics would create appropriate incentives to that effect."

Meats such as beef have a higher climate impact since cows release methane, a greenhouse gas that is more harmful in the short-term than carbon dioxide.

A plant-rich diet is identified by Project Drawdown as one of the top individual strategies for reducing greenhouse gas emissions, due to lower emissions from plant-based food production and reduced pressure on land for grazing. A 2018 study indicated that one fifth of Americans are responsible for about half of the country's diet-related carbon emissions, due mostly to eating high levels of meat, especially beef.

A 2022 study published in Nature Food found that if high-income nations switched to a plant-based diet, vast amounts of land used for animal agriculture could be allowed to return to their natural state, which in turn has the potential to sequester 100 billion tons of CO_{2} by 2100. In addition to mitigating climate change, other benefits of this transition would include improved water quality, restoration of biodiversity, and reductions in air pollution.

A 2022 survey found that 51% of Europeans support reducing the amount of meat and dairy products people purchase to address climate change. This level of support was higher than among Americans (40%) but lower than among Chinese respondents (73%). The survey also found that 79% of Europeans support labeling food products with their carbon footprint to help consumers make more sustainable choices, compared with 62% of Americans and 88% of Chinese respondents.

A 2023 paper published in Nature Food found that vegan diets reduce emissions, water pollution and land use by 75%, while also significantly reducing the destruction of wildlife and water usage.

=== Family planning aspects ===
Worldwide population growth is considered by some to be a challenge for climate change mitigation. Proposed measures include improved access to family planning and access of women to education and economic opportunities. Targeting natalistic politics involves cultural, ethical and societal issues. Various religions discourage or prohibit some or all forms of birth control. Although having fewer children is perhaps the individual action that most effectively reduces a person's climate impact, the issue is rarely raised, and it is arguably controversial due to its private nature. Even so some politicians such as Alexandria Ocasio-Cortez, and others started discussing the climate implications associated with reproduction. A 2021 study found that some people (in wealthy countries) were having fewer children due to their beliefs that they can do more to slow climate change if they do not have children. In the late 2020s the fertility rate dropped below replacement level.

Two interrelated aspects of this action, family planning and women and girl's education, are modeled by Project Drawdown as the #6 and #7 top potential solutions for climate change, based on the ability of family planning and education to reduce the growth of the overall global population. In 2019, a warning on climate change signed by 11,000 scientists from 153 nations said that human population growth adds 80 million humans annually, and "the world population must be stabilized—and, ideally, gradually reduced—within a framework that ensures social integrity" to reduce the impact of "population growth on GHG emissions and biodiversity loss". The policies they promote, which "are proven and effective policies that strengthen human rights while lowering fertility rates", would include removing barriers to gender equality, especially in education, and ensuring family planning services are available to all. Since then fertility has declined faster and humans population projections revised, to show that the human population may peak between 2060 and 2090.

In a 2021 paper it was said that "human population has been mostly ignored with regard to climate policy" and attribute this to the taboo nature of the issue given its association with population policies of the past, including forced sterilization campaigns and China's one-child policy. In 2022, a group of scientists urged families around the world to have no more than one child as part of the transformative changes needed to mitigate both climate change and biodiversity loss. However, because climate change needs to be limited within the next few decades, having fewer children now might not make much difference.

However the "per person carbon footprint" of individual people is likely to reduce over time due to efforts to decarbonize our economies and reach net zero emissions in the future.

== Others ==
=== Personal finance ===
Individuals can check whether the financial companies they are using are part of the Glasgow Financial Alliance for Net Zero and based on results, consider switching pensions, insurance and investments.

Donating to climate change charities has also been suggested as an impactful action to take up.

=== Digital services and cryptocurrencies ===
Cryptocurrencies which are made by proof-of-work such as Bitcoin, are high carbon because they use dirty electricity, such as electricity from Kazakhstan —some electricity in the United States used for Bitcoin mining is also dirty but the gas might be burned anyway. Cryptocurrency mining uses hardware for only a short time before it becomes e-waste.

Individuals with such cryptocurrency can switch to proof of stake crypto such as Tezos or Ethereum. Individuals can also decide to not invest in cryptocurrencies at all.

== Voting and political advocacy ==
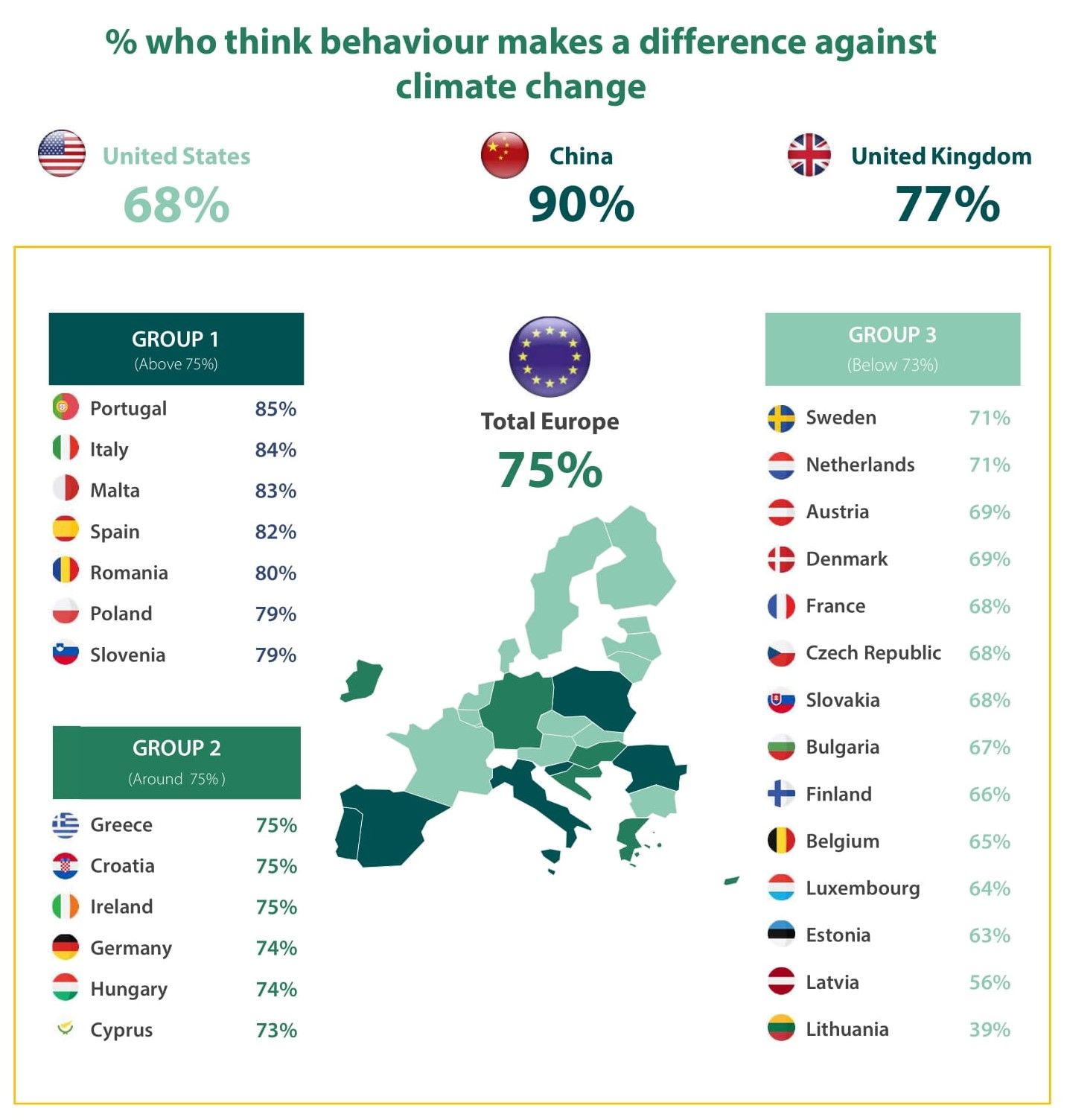
Country breakdown for people responding to the question "Do you think your own behavior can make a difference in tackling climate change?".

Impactful ways in the area of political advocacy that an individual can take include: individual citizen participation in groups advocating for collective action in the form of political solutions, such as carbon pricing, meat pricing, ending subsidies for fossil fuels and animal husbandry, and ending laws encouraging car use.

=== Activist movements ===
Degree of concern about the effects of climate change vary with political affiliation in the United States: Voters of the Democratic Party worry more about climate change than voters of the Republican party.

Climate change is a prevalent issue in many societies. Some believe that some of the long-term negative effects of climate change can be ameliorated through individual and community actions to reduce resource consumption. Thus, many environmental advocacy organizations associated with the climate movement (such as the Earth Day Network) focus on encouraging such individual conservation and grassroots organizing around environmental issues.

To raise awareness of climate issues, activists organized a series of international labor and school strikes in late September 2019, with estimates of total participants ranging between 6 and 7.3 million.

A number of groups from around the world have come together to work on the issue of global warming. Non-governmental organizations (NGOs) from diverse fields of work have united on this issue. A coalition of 50 NGOs called Stop Climate Chaos launched in Britain in 2005 to highlight the issue of climate change.

The Campaign against Climate Change was established to focus specifically on climate change and to encourage government action by organizing a large-scale movement aimed at driving political change.

Following environmentalist Bill McKibben's mantra that "if it's wrong to wreck the climate, it's wrong to profit from that wreckage", fossil fuel divestment campaigns attempt to get public institutions, such as universities and churches, to remove investment assets from fossil fuel companies. By December 2016, a total of 688 institutions and over 58,000 individuals representing $5.5 trillion in assets worldwide had been diverted from fossil fuels.

A 2023 review study published in One Earth stated that opinion polls show that most people perceive climate change as occurring now and close by. The study concluded that seeing climate change as more distant does not necessarily result in less climate action, and reducing psychological distancing does not reliably increase climate action.

=== Reform of subsidies and taxes ===
Political advocacy can focus on removing those fossil fuel and other subsidies, and taxes which discourage individual action on climate change, for example:

- Abolish a subsidy of kerosene because this subsidy discourages individuals switching to other fuels.
- Cutting farm subsidies for livestock because these subsidies could discourage individuals shifting to a plant based diet (as those subsidies artificially lowers the price of meat and dairy products):
- Rebalance the taxes and regulatory costs, which are currently higher for electricity than gas and thus discourage individuals from switching from gas boilers to heat pumps
- Abolish Turkey's free coal for poor families as such a program discourages people from switching to natural gas in cities.
- Redirecting the money which would have been spent as subsidies, together with any carbon tax, to form a carbon dividend in equal shares for everyone or for poor people to encourage individuals to take action as part of a just transition away from a high carbon lifestyle.

However, sudden removal of a subsidy by governments not trusted to redirect it, or without providing good alternatives for individuals, can lead to civil unrest. An example of this took place in 2019, when Ecuador removed its gasoline and diesel subsidies without providing enough electric buses to maintain service. The result was overnight fuel price hikes of 25–75 percent. The corresponding fare hikes for Ecuador's existing gas and diesel powered bus fleet were met with violent protests.

=== Climate conversations ===
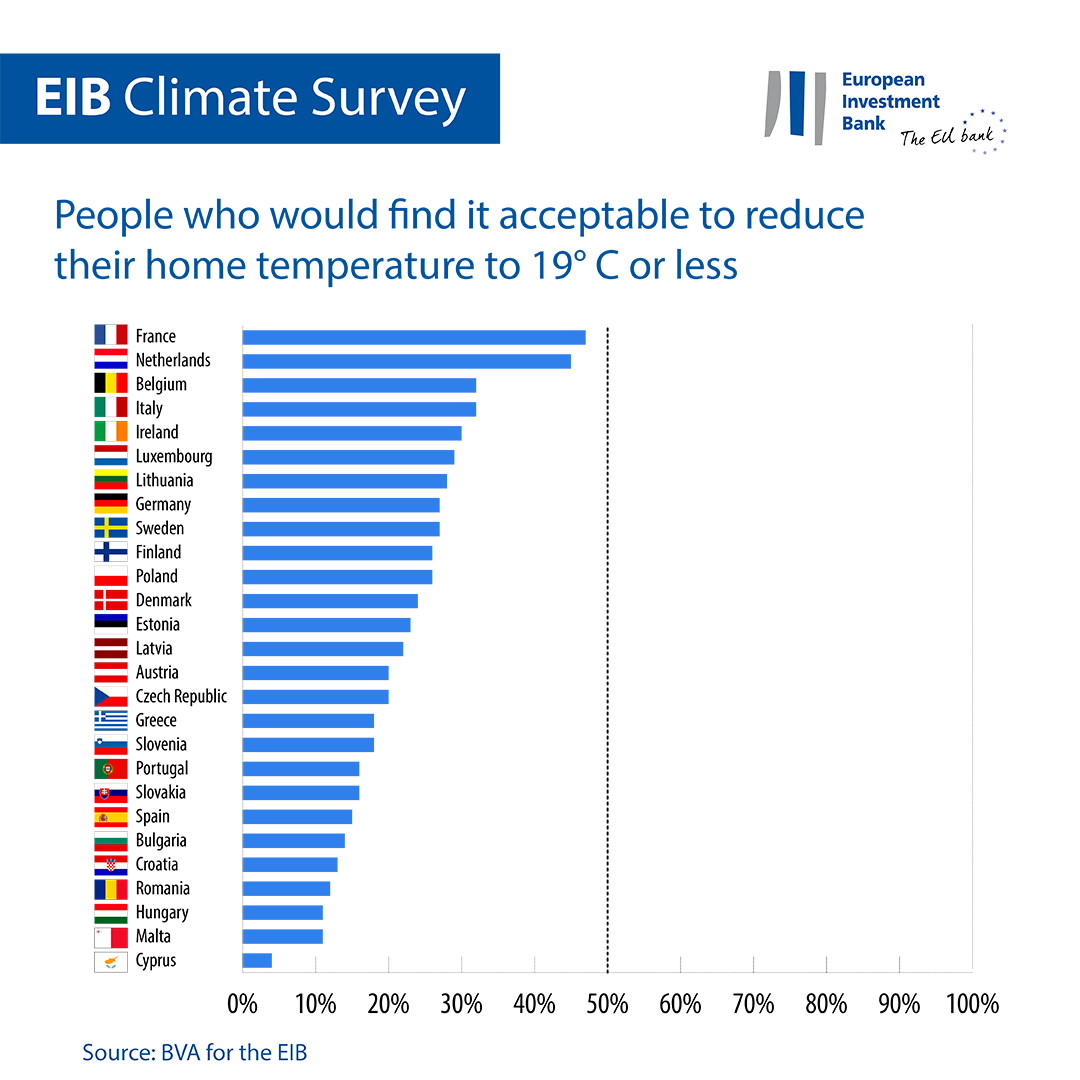
Respondents to a climate survey about reducing their home temperature to 19 °C (66 °F) or less (from various countries).

"Discussing global warming leads to greater acceptance of climate science". The Yale Climate Communication Program recommends initiating "climate conversations" with more moderate individuals. Once personal climate impacts and core values are understood; it may become possible to open a discussion of potential climate solutions which are consistent with those core values.

Carbon Conversations is a "psychosocial project that addresses the practicalities of carbon reduction while taking account of the complex emotions and social pressures that make this difficult". It was cited in The Guardian newspaper as one of the 20 best ideas to tackle climate change.

A study published in Nature Human Behaviour in 2025 found that presenting people with binary climate data—for example, a lake freezing versus not freezing—significantly increases the perceived impact of climate change compared to when continuous data such as temperature change is presented. The researchers said the findings confirmed the boiling frog effect for climate change communication.

=== Social contagion ===
Another opportunity for mitigation lies in social contagion. This phenomenon occurs when people adopt new behaviors, such as eating more plant-based foods or biking to work, and these behaviors spread naturally within their social networks.

For instance, a 2020 study by the Max Planck Institute found that meat-eaters were more likely to choose vegetarian dishes when dining with vegetarians, and this likelihood increased as the number of vegetarians in the group grew.

== Comparison of impacts of individual actions ==
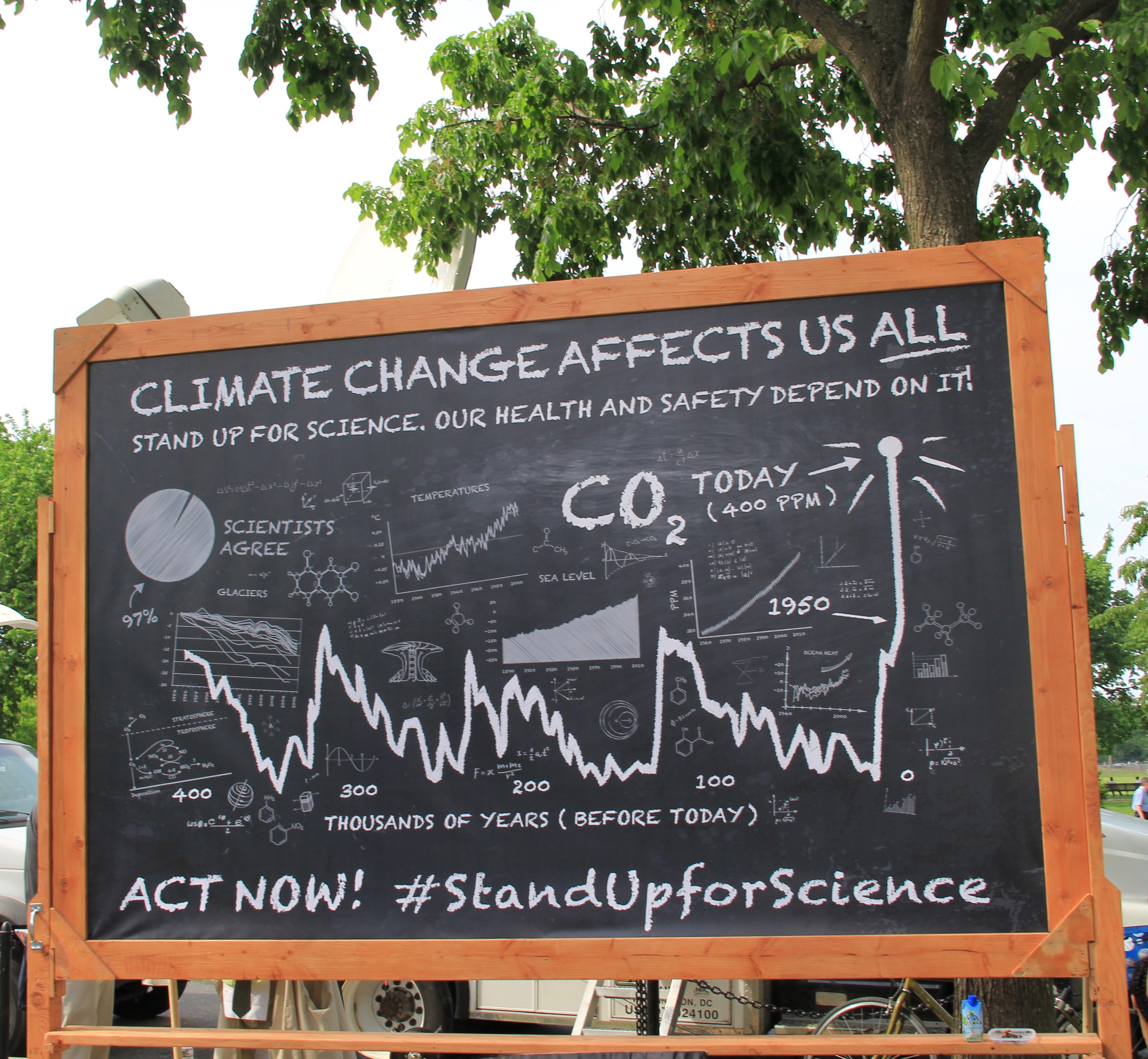
Graph of atmospheric carbon dioxide concentration, at the People's Climate March, in Washington DC on 29 April 2017.

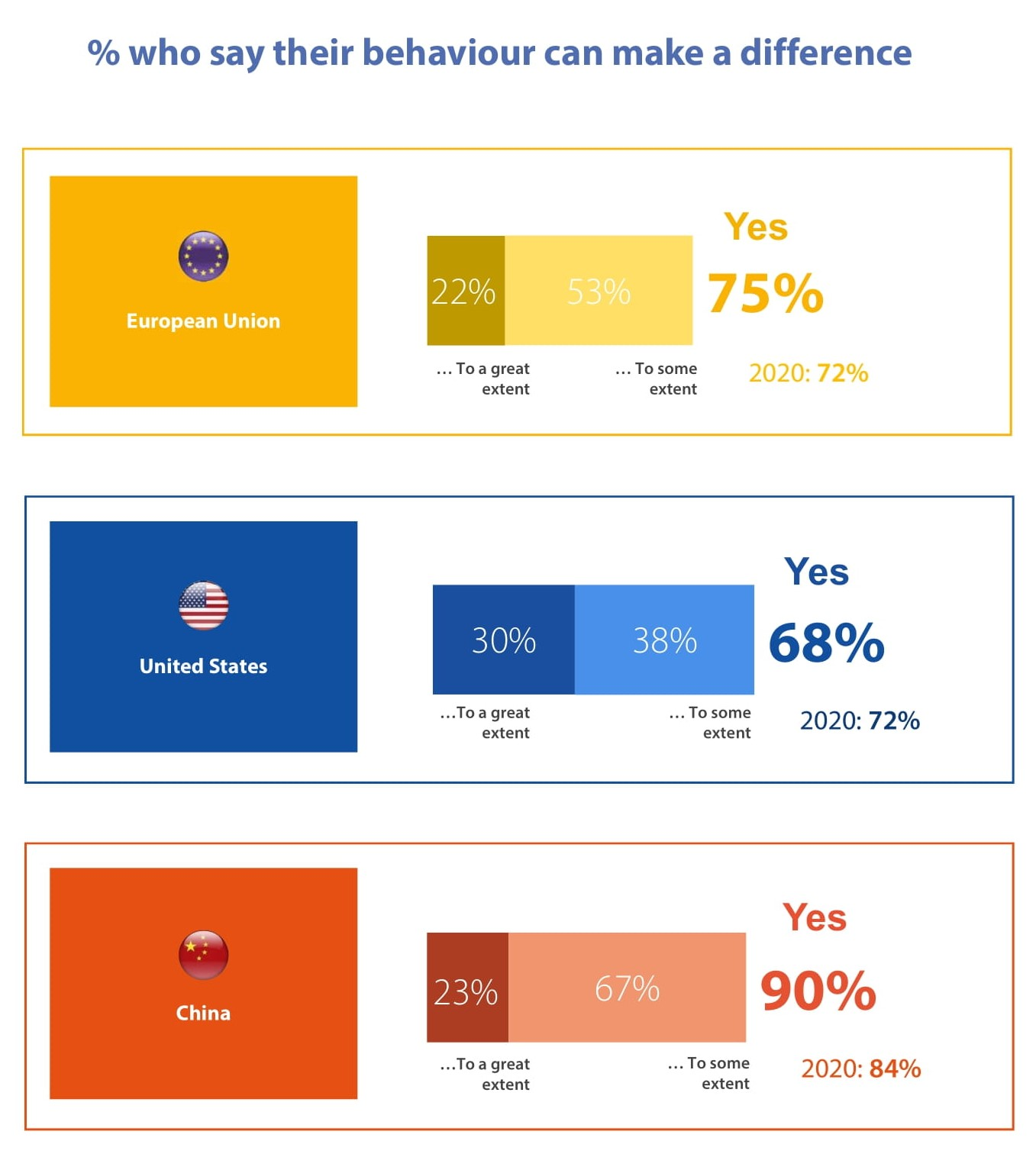
A growing number of Europeans and Chinese respondents to a climate survey believe that their behavior can make a difference in tackling climate change.

Public discourse on reducing one's carbon footprint overwhelmingly focuses on low-impact behaviors, and as of 2017, the mention of high-impact individual behaviors to impact climate was almost non-existent in mainstream media, government publications, K-12 school textbooks, etc.

Media focus on low impactrather than high impact behaviors is concerning for scientists. The most impactful actions for individuals may differ significantly from the popular advice for "greening" one's lifestyle. For instance, popular suggestions for individual actions include replacing a typical car with a hybrid, washing clothes in cold water, recycling, upgrading light bulbs which are all regarded as lower impact behaviors. A 2024 study of residents in a Finnish suburb found that recycling and reducing food waste were the most common actions, while fewer residents had adopted higher-impact actions such as switching to a vegetarian diet.

A few researchers have stated that "recommended high-impact actions are more effective than many more commonly discussed options. For example, eating a plant-based diet saves eight times more emissions than upgrading light bulbs." Recommended high-impact actions are around having fewer children, living car-free, avoiding long-distance flights and eating a plant-based diet. However, other publications state that "population is actually irrelevant to solving the climate crisis".

Other researchers say that decarbonization need not mean a more austere lifestyle, and that individual actions with the most impact rely on electrifying households with, for example, electric cars and heat pumps.

Scientists argue that piecemeal behavioral changes like re-using plastic bags do not provide proportionate effects on climate change. Though being beneficial, these debates would drive public focus away from the requirement for an energy system change of unprecedented scale to decarbonise rapidly.

Moreover, policy measures such as targeted subsidies, eco-tariffs, effective sustainability certificates, legal product information requirements, CO_{2} pricing, emissions allowances rationing, budget-allocations/labelling, targeted product-range exclusions, advertising bans and feedback mechanisms are examples of measures that could have a more substantial positive impact on consumption behavior than changes exclusively carried out by individual consumers and could address social issues such as consumers' inhibitive constraints of budgets, awareness and time.

=== Controversies around significance ===
It has been argued that climate change is a collective action problem, specifically a tragedy of the commons, which is a political and not individual category of problem.

Some commentators have argued that individual actions as consumers and "greening personal lives" are insignificant in comparison to collective action, especially actions that hold the fossil fuel corporations accountable for producing 71% of carbon emissions since 1988. The concept of a personal carbon footprint and calculating one's footprint was popularized by oil producer BP as "effective propaganda" as a way to shift their responsibility to "linguistically... remove itself as a contributor to the problem of climate change". Others have shown that sometimes individual measures may effectively undermine political support for structural measures. In one example researchers found that "a green energy default nudge diminishes support for a carbon tax."

Others say that individual action leads to collective action, and emphasize that "research on social behavior suggests lifestyle change can build momentum for systemic change." Furthermore, if individuals shrink their consumption of fossil fuel products, fossil fuel corporations are incentivized to produce less, as the demand for their product would decrease. In other words, each individual's consumption plays a role in the total supply of fossil fuels and emission of greenhouse gases.

According to a 2022 survey conducted by the European Investment Bank, climate change is the second most pressing issue confronting Europeans. Over three-quarters of respondents (72%) believe that their individual actions can make a difference in tackling the climate issue.

=== Misleading information on individual actions ===
In many cases, media coverage of climate change reports only about the effects of climate change, such as extreme weather, but makes no mention of either individual or government actions which can be taken.

The suggestion that eating a plant-based diet requires a person to become strictly vegetarian is also misinformation. A plant-based diet focuses on consuming foods primarily from plants but does not eliminate all animal products like a vegan diet does. This misconception heavily reduces the amount of people interested in initiating this certain habit as a way to individually impact climate change.

=== Climate change education ===
As of 2021, climate change education is absent in most countries or fails to provide adequate, in-depth information. However, progress has been made.

Italy became the first education system in the world to implement mandatory climate change education in classrooms in 2019. Pushed by Education minister, Lorenzo Fioramonti, this decision requires 6-to19-year-olds to have a minimum of one hour a week on topics related to climate change. It is expected to provide reflective material on how the students can help reduce this phenomenon. This regulation creates an opportunity to ensure individual action on climate change is acknowledged, suggested and done.

== Climate inaction ==
It has been hypothesised many times that no matter how strong the climate knowledge provided by risk analysts, experts and scientists is, risk perception determines agents' ultimate response in terms of mitigation. However, recent literature reports conflicting evidence about the actual impact of risk perception on agents' climate response. Rather, an indirect perception-response link with the mediation and moderation of many other factors and a strong dependency on the context analysed is shown.

Some moderation factors considered as such in the specialised literature include communication and social norms. Yet, conflicting evidence of the disparity between public communication about climate change and the lack of individual behavioural change has also been observed in the general public. Likewise, doubts are raised about the observance of social norms as an influencing predominant factor that affects taking action on climate change. Disparate evidence also showed that even agents highly engaged in mitigation (engagement is a mediation factor) actions fail ultimately to respond.

== See also ==
- Climate movement
- Environmental movement – Movement for addressing environmental issues
- Fossil fuel divestment – Divestment in companies that extract fossil fuels
- International Day of Climate Action – International environmental NGO
- List of climate activists – List of activists of have campaigned for climate change awareness
