= Swallows Wood =

English nature reserve

Coordinates: 53°28′32″N 1°59′19″W

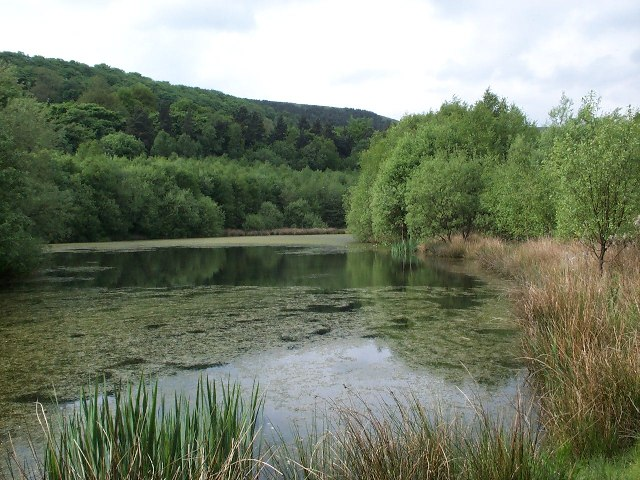
Swallows Wood Reservoir

Swallows Wood is a nature reserve near Hollingworth, Tameside, straddling the border between Greater Manchester and north Derbyshire. The 60-acre (0.24 km^{2}) reserve, which contains semi-natural woodlands, meadows, ponds and marsh areas, is owned by United Utilities who are responsible for its management. The site was formerly occupied by the Hollingworth and Waste Lodge reservoirs; these were demolished in 1987, and the nature reserve was installed in their place. Arnfield Reservoir, the lowest of the Longdendale Chain reservoirs, is nearby.

The route of the proposed Longdendale Bypass would pass through the nature reserve and there is an ongoing campaign to save the wood. Although the bypass has been threatening the wood for nearly 30 years Tameside Council have recently committed to planting 10,000 managed trees, in an attempt to move the woodland gradually away from the bypass route.

The wood is on the fringes of the Peak District National Park; many walkers enjoy the area as the views over the woods and moorland are particularly impressive.

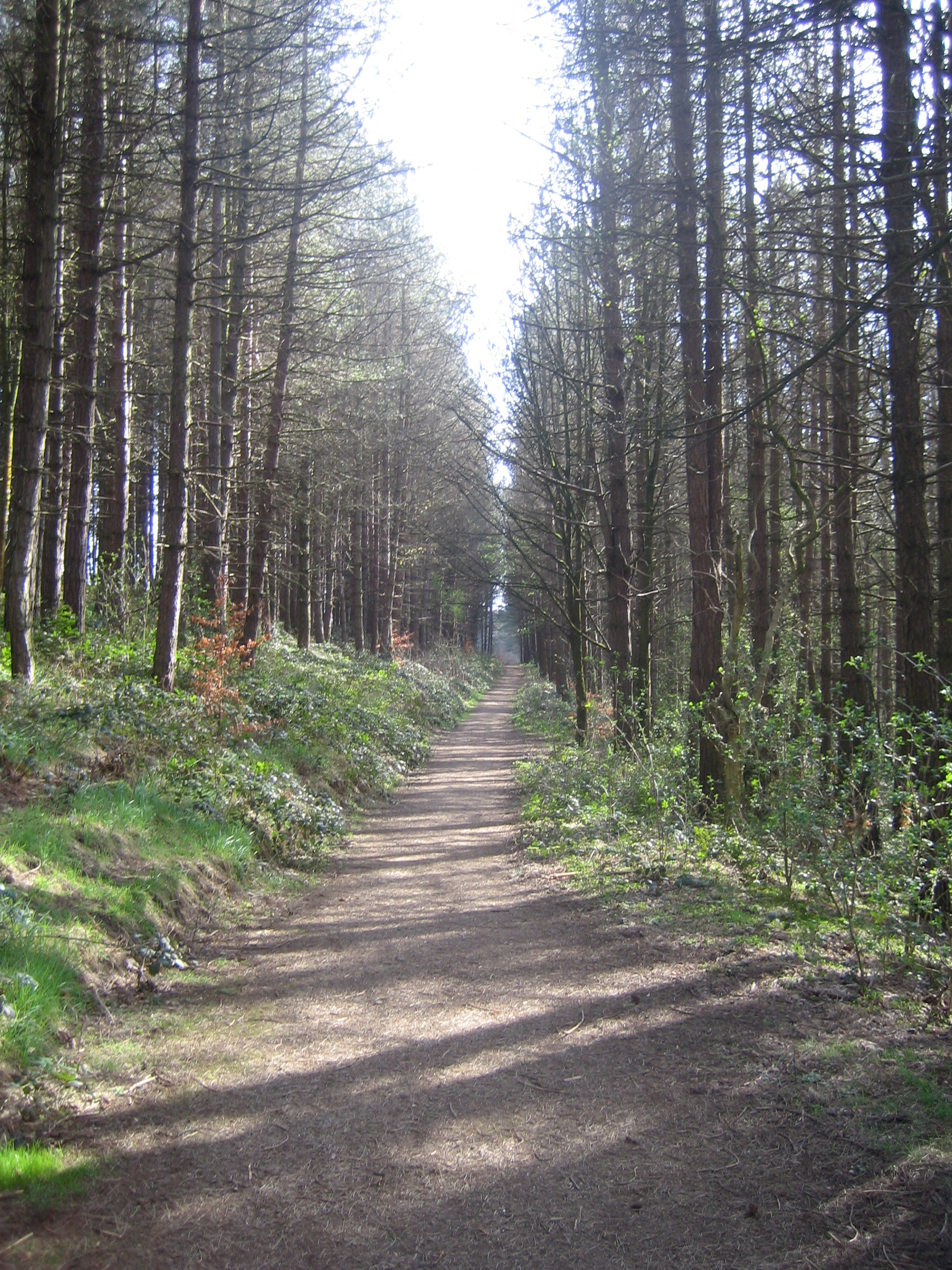

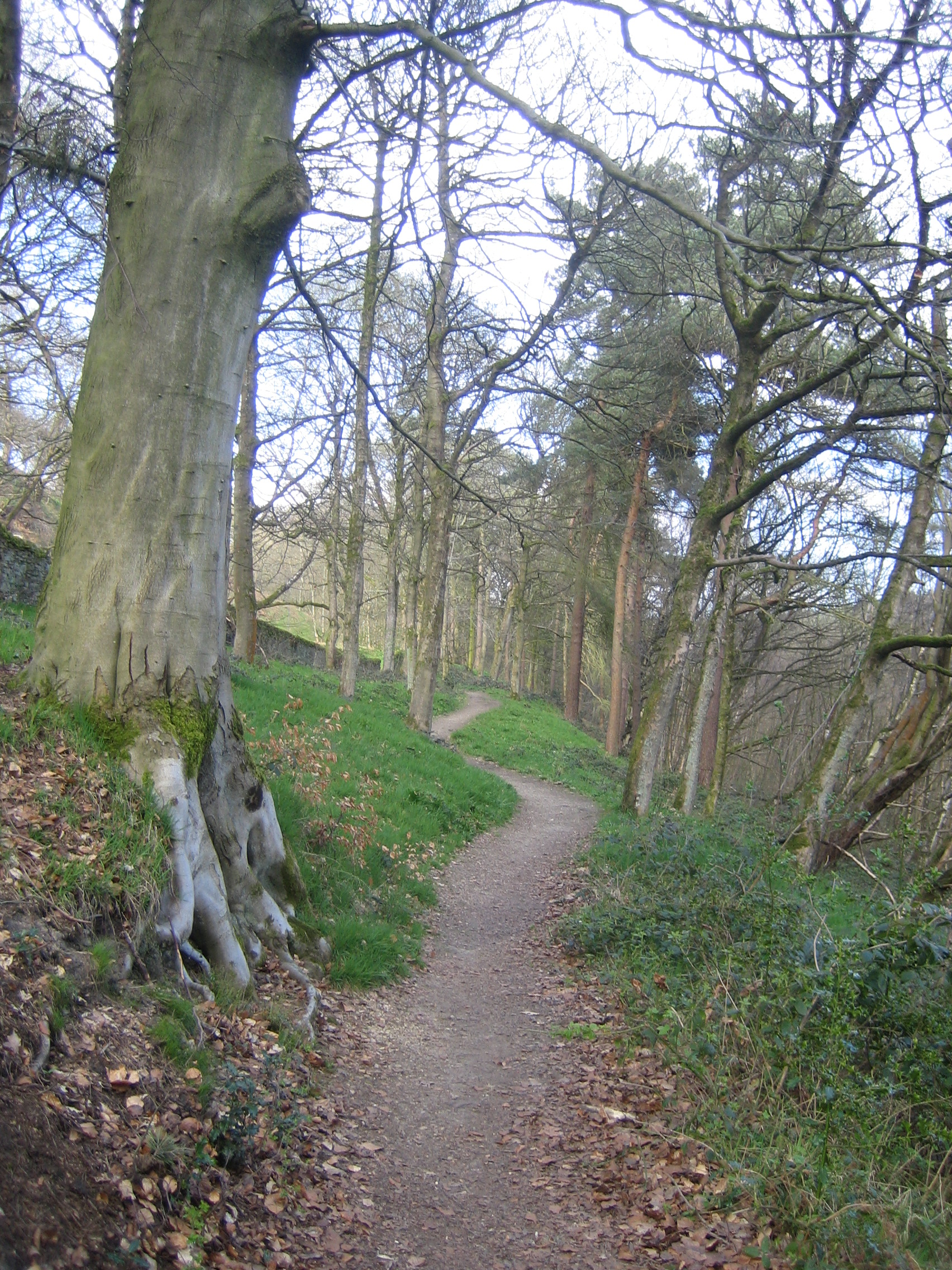

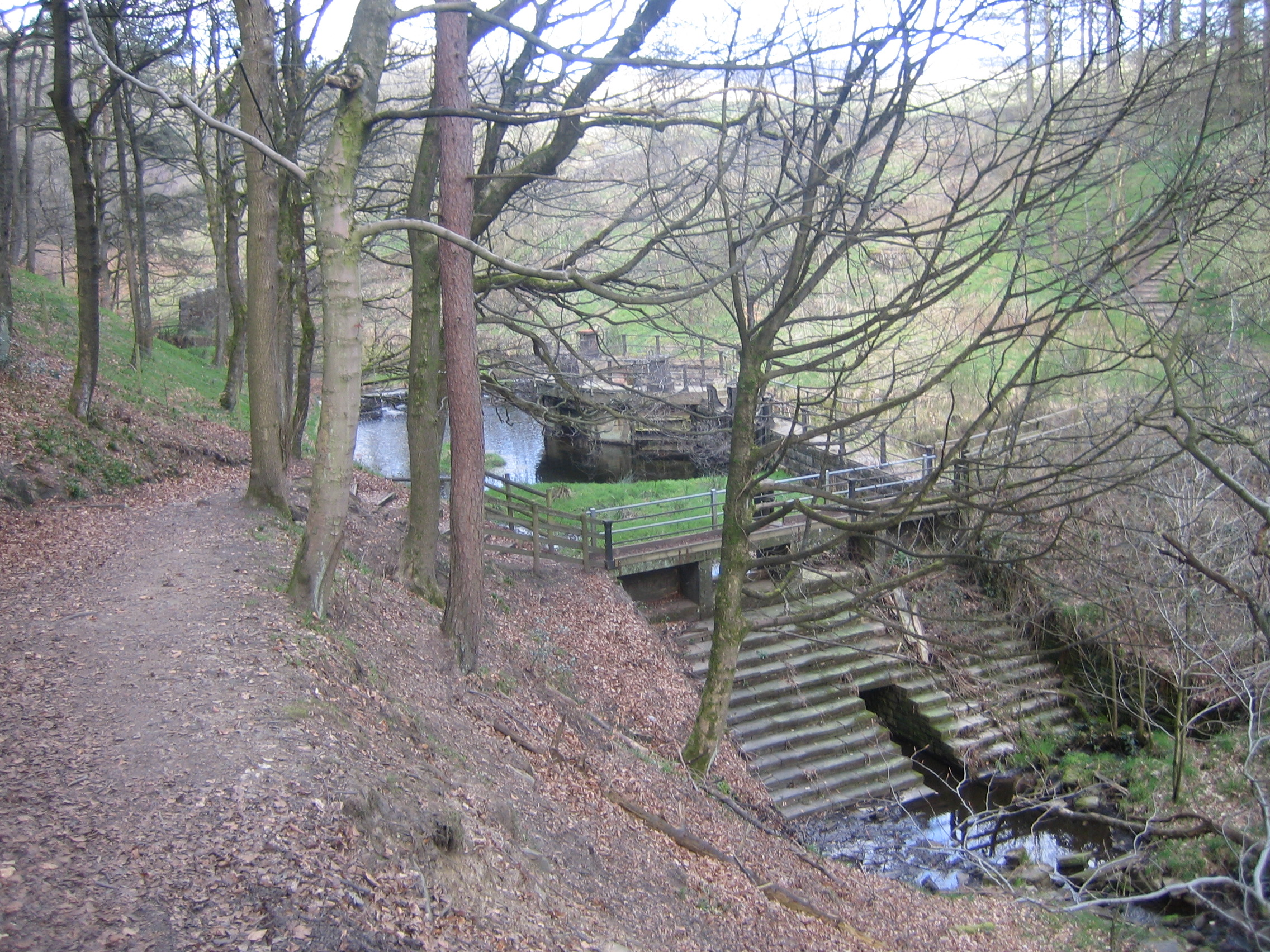

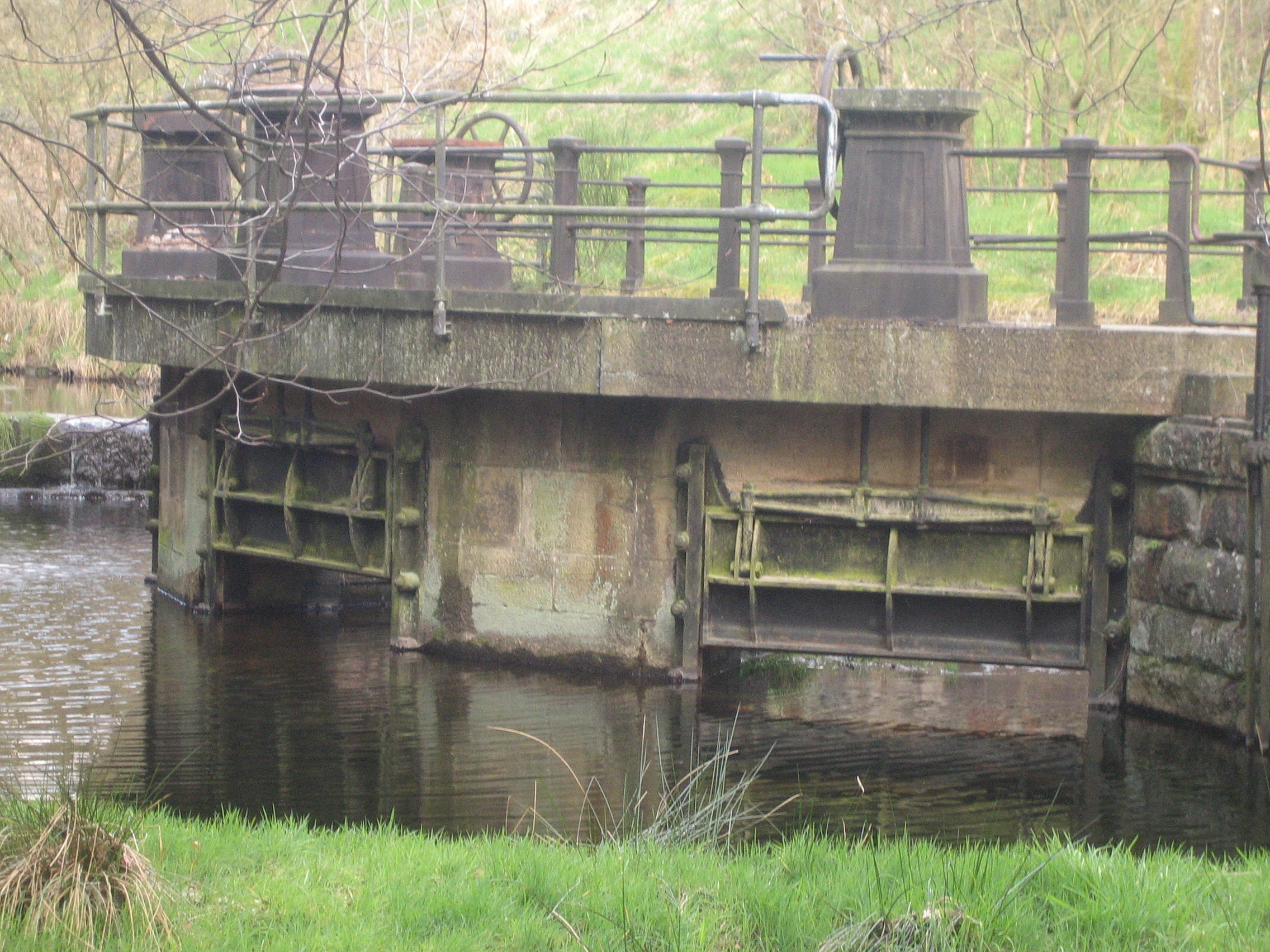

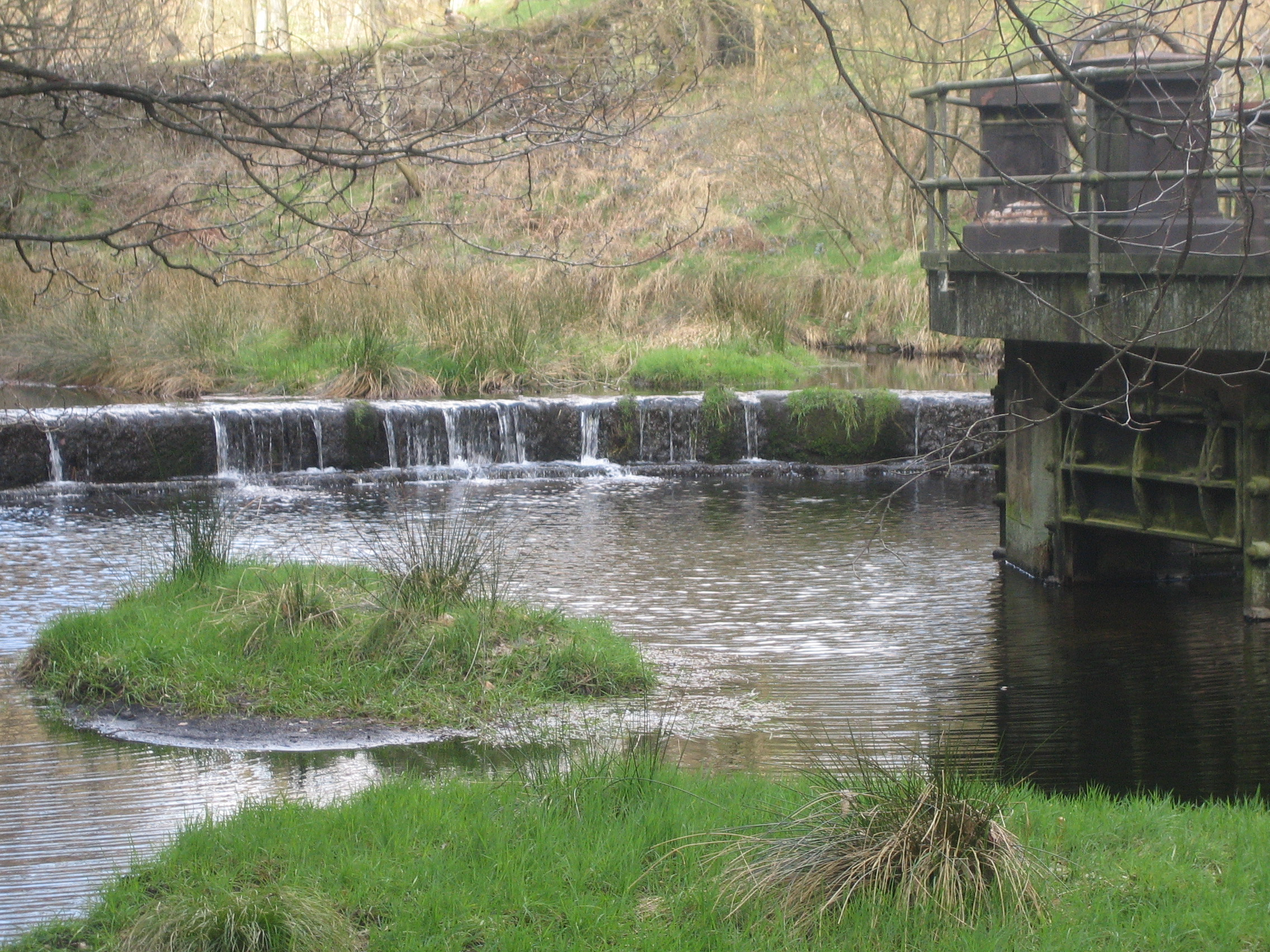
