= Kilkenny Central Access Scheme =

Kilkenny Central Access Scheme (CAS), previously Kilkenny Inner Relief Road Scheme is a controversial new road, improvement of existing roads and junctions and a new concrete bridge over the River Nore later named St. Francis Bridge, with provisions for footpaths and cycle lanes throughout. CAS comprises 4.5 kilometers of single carriageway road that is 7.3 metres wide. The scheme proved to be controversial, as some claimed that the route of the completed road would bring heavy traffic through residential areas and through the centre of the medieval Irishtown section of the city.

The Central Access Scheme was officially opened on 23 May 2017.

== History ==
The Inner Relief Road was first proposed in 1978 as a means of providing access to brewery traffic to the brewery itself, which has since closed.

The route dissects the medieval core of the old Irishtown of Kilkenny, one of the most historic quarters of the city. Large protests took place, with as many as 2,000 people protesting, a significant number given the small population of Kilkenny as a whole.

== Objectives ==
The Council’s objectives in providing the scheme were as follows:

- To build a unified city centre with the River Nore at its heart, with strong connectivity between High Street, The old Mart (an undeveloped shopping centre; currently for sale) and McDonagh Junction.
- Improve access to the city centre and provide for economic development;
- Reduce the impact of road traffic and private car domination on the city centre and concentrate the city's traffic through Dean Street; and enable partial pedestrianization of John’s Street and High Street.
- Improved accessibility for emergency services and access to health facilities and hospitals;
- Make provision for a shopping centre development on the west side of the city without creating traffic problems in existing residential areas.
- Provide access to the undeveloped "old Mart site" (a 5.5 acre brownfield site in the western suburbs of the city). The site was refused planning permission to be developed into a shopping centre.

== Route ==
The road commences at the Kilmanagh Road and passes northwards through a roundabout in the townland of Kilcreene. From Kilcreene, the CAS extends north eastwards to the Waterbarrack roundabout and along the existing Dean Street to St Canice’s Place (through medieval Irishtown). A new road was then built from the Kilmanagh road to the Waterbarrack, with another stem going from the Kennyswell roundabout to the Freshford Road. The last section from Kennyswell over the River Nore via the new St. Francis Bridge to the Castlecomer road required the demolition of three houses in Vicar Street. The three houses (particularly the south gable wall of number 22) formed part of the medieval manse house of the prebendary of Tiscoffin and were demolished to build the new road.

The design of the Inner Relief road was by RoadMalone O’Regan/Scott Wilson, Consulting Engineers who were engaged by Kilkenny Council.

== Funding ==
Over €11.6 million was allocated to non-national roads in Kilkenny in 2005 under the now-defunct National Development Plan (NDP). The NDP was funded primarily by the Exchequer with support from the EU Structural Funds. The funding was designated for work on projects such as the R695/R887 Central Access Scheme and the new River Nore bridge.

== Publications and Environmental Impact Report ==
Formal publication of the Inner Relief Road Scheme and Environmental Impact Report.

Between June and December 2008 the scheme approval was subject to An Bord Pleanala.

== Phases ==
Phase 1 started in November 2008 and ended in August 2012. This involved a detailed design, tender, awarding and construction.

Phase 2 started in September 2012 and ended in August 2013.

Phase 3 started in September 2013 and ended in May 2017.

== See also ==
- Roads in Ireland- (National Primary Roads)
- Secondary Roads
- Regional Roads
