= The Climate Coalition =

UK organisation for action on climate change

- Company type: Environmental Organisation; Charity
- Headquarters: London, England, (United Kingdom)
- Area served: United Kingdom
- Revenue: 602,787 pound sterling (2020)
- Number of employees: 10 (2024)

The Climate Coalition is an organisation dedicated to action against climate change in the United Kingdom.

== Overview ==
The Climate Coalition is the operating name of the registered charity The Climate Movement. Along with its sister organisations Stop Climate Chaos Cymru and Stop Climate Chaos Scotland, the group includes over 130 organisations - including the National Trust, Women's Institute, Oxfam, the Salvation Army, and the RSPB. It holds two main annual campaigns: Show The Love and Speak Up Week, as well as the Green Heart Hero Awards.

== History ==
The Climate Coalition was founded in 2005. It was originally called Stop Climate Chaos.

By 2015, the organisation had gained celebrity endorsement, and the first Show The Love campaign was backed by Ridley Scott, Stephen Fry, Dermot O'Leary, Alison Steadman, Raymond Blanc, Meera Syal and others. This contributed to UK political leaders promising to tackle climate change.

It held a climate rally on 26 June 2019, with over 12,000 arriving at Parliament to tell their representatives urgent action is needed.

== See also ==
- UK Youth Climate Coalition
