= Transform Scotland =

- Registration no.: SC041516
- Purpose: Promote sustainable transport
- Headquarters: 5 Rose Street, Edinburgh, EH2 2PR
- Region served: Scotland
- Board of directors: Board of trustees (9 as of 2020)
- Budget: £115,417 (2018/2019)
- Revenue: £121,644 (2018/2019)

Transform Scotland is a registered charity based in Edinburgh (charity number 041516). They campaign on issues regarding sustainable transport, encouraging improved transport policies and practice. The organisation is made up of over 60 member groups, including those from the private, public and voluntary sectors. Transform Scotland is the sister organisation of the Campaign for Better Transport, who operate in England and Wales.

Transform Scotland use a number of tactics in order to encourage the growth of sustainable transport, including lobbying the Scottish Government, carrying out media work, responding to government consultations, compiling independent evidence and research, producing publications and briefing documents, and holding events and projects. They focus on improving public transport and gaining greater funding for sustainable modes of transport, rather than on increased road use.

Transform Scotland is a member of the European Federation for Transport and Environment (T&E) and their Director Colin Howden was formally on the Board of T&E. Transform Scotland has three full-time members of staff and has a number of part-time staff and volunteers.

== History ==
Transform Scotland was launched in November 1997. It was created by a number of NGOs (Scottish Association for Public Transport, Friends of the Earth Scotland and RailFuture) from the environment and transport sectors and local councils such as City of Edinburgh Council.

The first chair of the organisation was David Spaven, who continued in his post until 2006 when Paul Tetlaw took over as chair, followed by John Pinkard in 2010, and then Phil Matthews who took over in 2013. In 2020, Julianne Robertson became the first female, and fifth chair of the charity. Since January 2022 Stuart Hay took over as acting chair.

The organisation was launched with around 40 founding member groups from the public, private and voluntary sectors. Colin Howden was appointed as director in April 1998 and has remained in this post.

For nine years until 2007, Transform Scotland was based in Friends of the Earth offices in Leith and in 2007 it moved to the Ethical Property centre at 5 Rose Street.

== Campaigning ==
Transform Scotland is a campaigning organisation encouraging sustainable transport. Its members are drawn from the private sector (bus, rail, ferry companies), public sector (local authorities) and voluntary sector (national environment and transport groups, local rail and cycle campaigns). They are governed by a board of directors elected by the member groups. Although the members are organisations, it is also possible to join as an individual supporter.

The organisation has played a key role in advocating for the Edinburgh tram scheme, and the Scottish Government's support for the tram development was announced at Transform Scotland's Transport Conference in 2001. The organisation secured an amendment to the Scottish Transport Act to allow home zones to be set up in Scotland. They have been heavily involved in anti-motorway campaigns, in particular joint action against the JAM 74. Transform Scotland campaigned unsuccessfully for a ‘yes’ vote for the Edinburgh congestion charge in 2005. The group took a leading role in coordinating the January 2012 cycle demo outside St Andrews house which led to the Scottish Government reversing its plans to slash cycle funding. Transform Scotland published a guide to Car-Free tourism in Scotland (http://tourism.transformscotland.org.uk).

== Social enterprises ==
Transform Scotland has two social enterprises. TRAC is Scotland's specialist consultancy for sustainable transport. TRAC do research and communications for all modes of sustainable travel, from trains, buses and ferries to walking, cycling and more sustainable car use. Transform Creative are a partnership of creative professionals specialising in design and campaign communications.

== Key publications ==
"The Railways Mean Business" (November 2007) This comprehensively looked at the productivity benefits of using rail over air for Scotland to London business travel.

http://transformscotland.org.uk/wp/wp-content/uploads/2014/12/The-Railways-Mean-Business.pdf

"Towards a Healthier Economy" (December 2008) This studied the links between sustainable transport and the economy. Its key finding was that a move to continental levels of cycle use would benefit the Scottish economy between £2-4bn per annum through avoided health costs.

http://transformscotland.org.uk/wp/wp-content/uploads/2014/12/Towards-a-Healthier-Economy.pdf

"Civilising the Streets" (June 2010) This reviewed a dozen cities across the continent to identify the political, social and cultural factors that led to their high cycle rates and how this could be used in Scotland to drive similar change.

http://transformscotland.org.uk/wp/wp-content/uploads/2014/12/Civilising-the-Streets.pdf

"On track for business: Why Scottish businesses should try the train" (October 2012) This sets out the economic benefits available to Scottish businesses in switching from air travel to rail travel.

http://transformscotland.org.uk/wp/wp-content/uploads/2014/12/On-Track-for-Business-full-report.pdf

"The Value of Cycle Tourism" (June 2013) This sets out the value of cycle tourism for the Scottish economy.

http://transformscotland.org.uk/wp/wp-content/uploads/2014/12/The-Value-of-Cycle-Tourism-full-report.pdf

"Doing Their Duty?" (November 2013) This sets out whether Scotland's major public bodies are doing enough to cut their emissions.

http://transformscotland.org.uk/wp/wp-content/uploads/2014/12/Doing-Their-Duty.pdf

"Interchange Summary Report" (September 2014) Summary Report of the Transform Scotland project 'Interchange: Linking cycling with public transport'.

http://transformscotland.org.uk/wp/wp-content/uploads/2014/12/Interchange-Summary-Report.pdf

"Car-Free Tourism" (June 2015) Advice on how to visit Scotland's most popular tourist attractions on foot, by bike or by public transport.

http://tourism.transformscotland.org.uk/

"A Green Journey to Growth" (August 2017) New research looking into the carbon benefits of Anglo-Scottish rail.

http://transformscotland.org.uk/wp/wp-content/uploads/2017/08/A-Green-Journey-to-Growth-Transform-Scotland-report.pdf

"Moving the Vote: Sustainable transport in the party manifestos for the 2021 Scottish Parliament elections" (May 2021)

https://transform.scot/wp/wp-content/uploads/2021/04/Moving-the-Vote-report-Transform-Scotland-2021-04-26.pdf

"Open for Business: Gaining business support for transforming city centres" (June 2021)

https://transform.scot/wp/wp-content/uploads/2021/06/Open-for-Business-Transform-Scotland-report.pdf

"Roads to Ruin: New report finds climate-wrecking roads programme due to double in size" (August 2021)

https://transform.scot/blog/2021/08/10/roads-to-ruin-new-report-finds-climate-wrecking-roads-programme-due-to-double-in-size/

"Putting Down Routes: New report provides blueprint for delivering Scottish ‘Active Freeway’ network" (October 2021)

https://transform.scot/blog/2021/10/07/putting-down-routes-new-report-provides-blueprint-for-delivering-scottish-active-freeway-network/
