= Friends of the Earth Scotland =

Scottish environmental organization

- Formation: 1980
- Legal status: Charity
- Purpose: Climate justice, environmental justice, environmentalism and human rights
- Headquarters: Edinburgh
- Region served: Scotland
- Members: 3,000
- Website: www.foe.scot

Friends of the Earth Scotland (FoE Scotland) is a Scottish charity and an independent member of the Friends of the Earth International network of 73 environmental organisations. It is one of the 30 national organisations that Friends of the Earth Europe represents and unites at the European level.

FoE Scotland has a membership of around 3,000 people in Scotland.

== History ==
Scotland's first Friends of the Earth group was formed in 1972 and the first joint meeting of all Scotland's local groups was held in 1977. In 1980 it became legally independent of Friends of the Earth Ltd. By 1982 it had a membership of around 1,200. FoE Scotland has been registered as a charity since 1 January 1992, and is an independent charity registered with the Office of the Scottish Charity Regulator (OSCR), Scottish charity number SC 003442. FoE Scotland operates separately from Friends of the Earth in England, Wales and Northern Ireland (EWNI).

In 1991 Kevin Dunion was appointed as their first director, leaving in 2003 to become the Scottish Information Commissioner. Richard Dixon was appointed Director in 2013.

In 2003 Friends of the Earth Scotland won The Guardian newspaper's "Charity of the Year" Award. In 2021, FoE Scotland played a leading role in the civil society response to the UN Climate Talks (COP26) coming to Glasgow, helping to organise the largest ever climate march in Scotland and the UK.

== Previous campaigns ==
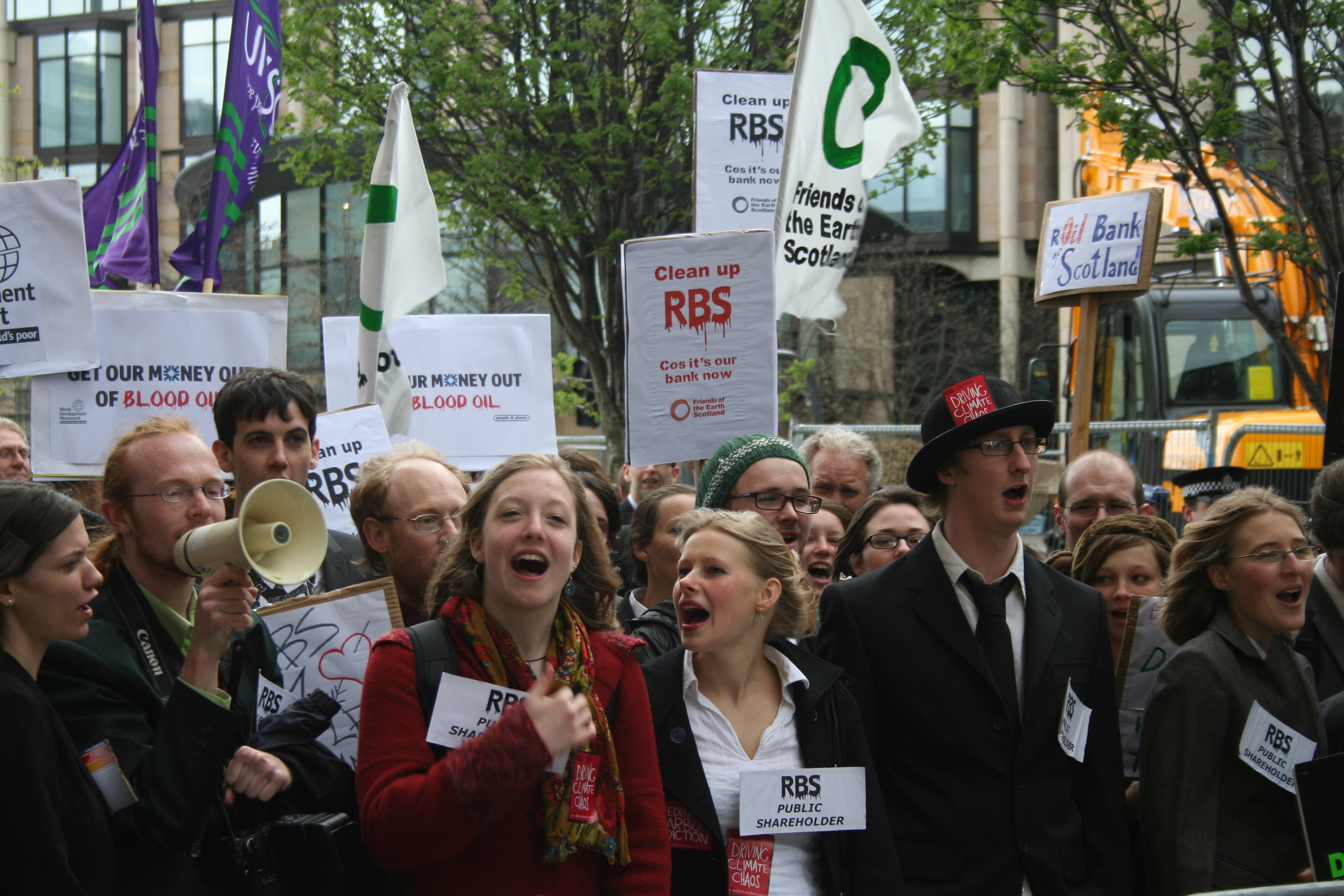
Protest outside the RBS (Royal Bank of Scotland) AGM, 2010, with members of Friends of the Earth Scotland and other groups

Previous campaigns have included:

- Clean up Royal Bank of Scotland. Called for ethical and responsible behaviour from banks who were bailed out with public money
- Carbon Dinosaurs. FoE Scotland drew attention to the presence of the most polluting coal-fired power plants in 2003
- Hunterston. In 2010 it campaigned against plans for a new coal-fired power station at Hunterston in Ayrshire. In June 2012 Ayrshire Power withdrew their planning application
- M74 protests. FoE Scotland were involved with protests against extension of the M74, withdrawing their legal action in 2006
- South Harris super quarry. It campaigned against a planned superquarry in South Harris 1994−2004
- Climate change legislation. FoE Scotland pushed for Scotland to have strong climate change legislation. The Climate Change (Scotland) Act 2009 was seen as world-leading when it was passed

== Local groups ==
Friends of the Earth Scotland has a network of ten local groups. There are groups in Aberdeen, Dumfries, Edinburgh, Falkirk, Fife, Glasgow, Inverness & Ross, Moray, Stirling and Tayside.

== See also ==
- Anti-nuclear movement in the United Kingdom
- Nuclear power in Scotland
