= Stop Climate Chaos =

UK climate change organisation

- Founded: September 2005; London, United Kingdom
- Type: Coalition of NGOs
- Purpose: Environmentalism
- Location: London, United Kingdom
- Region served: United Kingdom
- Method: Lobbying, Demonstration
- Members: in excess of 100 organisations who comprise the coalition's 11 million members
- Website: www.stopclimatechaos.ie

Logo of the Stop Climate Chaos Coalition

Stop Climate Chaos is a coalition of non-governmental organizations (NGOs) in the United Kingdom that focuses on climate change. It was established in September 2005 and is known for running the "I Count" campaign from 2006 to 2007. In addition, the coalition organized 'The Wave" on 5 December 2009 as a lead-up to the UN talks in Copenhagen.

The primary goal of the coalition is to encourage individuals to adopt their own measures and advocate for what they consider to be positive climate change policies from the government of the United Kingdom. From 2005 to 2010, the coalition was led by Ashok Sinha, an environmental campaigner. Although closely affiliated with Stop Climate Chaos Scotland, the coalition operates as a separate organization.

The movement's primary objectives include pressuring governments to implement effective environmental policies, transitioning to renewable energy sources, and curbing greenhouse gas emissions. Through a series of campaigns, protests, and educational initiatives, "Stop Climate Chaos" aims to foster a sense of shared responsibility for the planet's well-being. Notable achievements include influencing policy changes, mobilizing mass demonstrations, and encouraging businesses to adopt eco-friendly practices. However, the movement has not been without its critics, who raise concerns about its methods, effectiveness, and potential economic implications.

== 'I Count' Campaign ==
The 'I Count' campaign had the objective of urging world leaders to address the increasing global greenhouse gas emissions and keep the annual global temperature rise below 2 °C (3.6 °F) to mitigate the severe consequences of global warming.

In 2006, the campaign concentrated on influencing the government to introduce a climate change bill during the upcoming parliamentary session. The proposed bill aimed to enforce legally binding reductions in emissions (3% per year and 50% by 2050) and establish an annual carbon budget.

On 4 November 2006 the 'I Count' Climate Change Rally took place in London. Approximately 20,000 to 25,000 individuals participated, coinciding with the release of the Stern Report, which emphasized the need for more decisive action by the government to address climate change.

The rally commenced with an initial gathering at Grosvenor Square, outside the US Embassy, where George Monbiot, Caroline Lucas, and Norman Baker delivered speeches to the attendees. The rally then proceeded to Trafalgar Square, joining a pre-existing crowd. The campaign further focused on the provisions of the Climate Change Bill, critiquing the initial proposals for failing to consider the 'global warming danger threshold' of 2 °C.

== The Energy Campaign ==
Towards the end of 2008, following the successful passage of the Climate Change Act in Parliament, the coalition shifted its focus towards energy policy. The revised campaign objectives called for increased investment in renewable energy and the abandonment of proposals for a series of coal power stations, starting with Kingsnorth. Through their website, the coalition facilitated a pair of e-actions, resulting in the delivery of numerous emails to Ed Miliband, Gordon Brown, and local MPs, urging a reconsideration of energy policy. Additionally, the coalition collaborated with the Age of Stupid team on their Not Stupid campaign.

== The Wave ==
On 5 December 2009 supporters and members of Stop Climate Chaos convened in London and Glasgow to coincide with the United Nations Climate Change Conference 2009 held in Copenhagen. The objective was to urge the British Government and representatives from other political parties in the United Kingdom to take action on three key issues: discontinuing the use of coal, safeguarding the most vulnerable communities, and implementing swift and equitable measures to mitigate the severe consequences of climate change. Estimates of attendance range from 40,000 to 60,000 individuals, making it the largest climate change demonstration to date.

== Lobby of MPs ==
In November 2010, the coalition arranged the "Big Climate Connection", an event where individuals met with Members of Parliament to discuss the Cancún climate summit and the upcoming Energy Bill. The purpose was to engage in a constructive dialogue and provide input on these important matters.

== Members ==
The members of the coalition include:

- Airport Watch
- A Rocha
- CAFOD
- Campaign against Climate Change
- Carplus
- Christian Aid
- Climate Outreach and Information Network
- Come Off It
- Environmental Justice Foundation
- Ethical Consumer
- Friends of the Earth
- Greenpeace
- IFEES
- Islamic Relief
- Justice and Peace Scotland
- Medact
- National Trust for Scotland
- National Union of Students of the United Kingdom
- Operation Noah
- Oxfam
- People & Planet
- Plan B
- Practical Action
- Road Block
- RSPB
- Scottish Action on Climate Change
- Save our World
- SCIAF
- Shared Energy
- SPEAK network
- Surfers Against Sewage
- Sustrans
- Take Global Warming Seriously
- Tearfund
- The Wildlife Trusts
- Transport 2000
- UNA-UK
- UK Youth Climate Coalition
- UNISON
- Women's Institute
- Women's Environmental Network
- Woodland Trust
- World Development Movement
- WWF-UK
- Youth Against Climate Change

== See also ==
- A Green New Deal
- Campaign against Climate Change (pressure group)
- United Kingdom Climate Change Programme
- United Kingdom Climate Change Bill
- Action on climate change
- Global Day of Action
