= El Sherbini =

El Sherbini, El Sherbiny, El Sherbeny or Al Shirbini (Egyptian Arabic: الشربيني) is an Egyptian surname, deriving from the city of Sherbin; a Palestinian variation, Sharbini, exists. Notable people with this surname include:

- Al-Khatib al-Shirbini (died 1570), Egyptian Sunni scholar
- Ahmad Sharbini (born 1984), Croatian footballer
- Anas Sharbini (born 1987), Croatian footballer
- Gamal El-Din El-Sherbini (1923–1995), Egyptian athlete
- Ibrahim M. El-Sherbiny, Egyptian professor of nanomaterials
- Mahmoud El-Sherbini (born 1937), Egyptian wrestler
- Marwa El-Sherbini (1978–2009), Egyptian murder victim
- Mimi El-Sherbini (1938–2025), Egyptian footballer
- Mohamed ElSherbini (born 1992), Egyptian squash player
- Norsuriati Sharbini (born 1973), Bruneian civil servant, judge-advocate and army officer
- Nour El Sherbini (born 1995), Egyptian squash player
- Said Sharbini, American attorney and politician
- Sherif El-Sherbiny (born 1982), Egyptian engineer and politician

== See also ==
- Sherbino
