= Mercedes Richards =

Jamaican astronomer

Professor Mercedes Richards
- Mercedes Richards in 2009
- Born: 14 May 1955; Kingston, Jamaica
- Died: 3 February 2016 (aged 60); Hershey, Pennsylvania
- Other names: Mercedes Tharam Davis
- Education: University of the West Indies (BSc); York University, Toronto (MS); University of Toronto (PhD)
- Known for: tomography of interacting binary star systems and cataclysmic variable stars
- Spouse: Donald Richards
- Awards: Musgrave Medal, 2008, Fulbright Distinguished Chair Research, 2011
- Scientific career
- Fields: Astronomy, Astrophysics

Mercedes Tharam Richards (Kingston, 14 May 1955 – Hershey, 3 February 2016), née Davis, was a Jamaican astronomy and astrophysics professor. Her investigation focused on computational astrophysics, stellar astrophysics and exoplanets and brown dwarfs, and the physical dynamics of interacting binary stars systems. However, her pioneering research in the tomography of interacting binary star systems and cataclysmic variable stars to predict magnetic activity and simulate gas flow is her most known work.

In 1977, she graduated with the degree of BSc in Physics from the University of the West Indies. She then moved to Toronto, where two years later, in 1979, she received the MS in Space Science at York University, Toronto, and in 1986 she earned her PhD in Astronomy and Astrophysics from the University of Toronto.

She worked as president of Commission 42 of the International Astronomical Union (IAU) which deals with Close Binary Stars, was a member of the Board of Advisers of the Caribbean Institute of Astronomy and a councilor of the American Astronomical Society.

She also cooperated with some projects to encourage people's engagement with science, one of them was the Summer Experience in the Eberly College of Science in 2006, a six-week summer programme that was designed to engage low-income high-school students in science research.

== Biography ==
=== Early years ===
She was born in Kingston, Jamaica, on 14 May 1955. In one of the city's suburbs, she was raised by her father, Frank Davis, a police detective who stressed to her the importance of observation and deduction, and her mother, Phyllis Davis, an accountant who instilled in her the idea of doing her work with precision.

Richards and her father would go to a botanical garden after dawn and observe the nature around them. He taught her to identify the colour varieties, training that would be useful in her career for the examination of stars.

"What I do is definitely detective work," she explains. "Astronomers want to know what happened. We look for evidence. We have to piece it all together like forensic scientists of the sky."

She attended Providence Primary School and graduated in 1966. Then, she studied in St. Hugh's High School, an all-girls high school. The fact of only having female teachers inspired her because she used them as role models. She graduated in 1973.

=== Academic beginnings ===
Richards graduated with the degree of BSc with Special Honors in Physics from the University of the West Indies in 1977 and in 1979 she earned an MS in Space Science at York University in Toronto. Persistence during her studies in Toronto helped her in a time when teachers were tough with female students. She received her PhD in Astronomy and Astrophysics in 1986 at the University of Toronto.

=== Personal life ===
She married Donald Richards in 1980, a professor of Statistics at Pennsylvania State University. They had two daughters, Chandra and Suzanne.

Even though she had little free time, she enjoyed reading detective novels and writing poetry. She liked playing the violin and she passed some exams at the British Royal School of Music. Richards spoke French fluently and had a working knowledge of Spanish, Slovak, Czech, and German. Along with her many refined hobbies, she maintained a concern with the most vulnerable part and cooperated with food banks.

=== Professional career ===
During the 1986–87 scholar year, she worked as a visiting scholar at the University of North Carolina at Chapel Hill. In 1987, she joined the University of Virginia in Charlottesville, where she started as an assistant professor in the Department of Astronomy. At this university,y she moved up to associate professor in 1993 and became a professor of astronomy in 1999. During that year she worked at the Vatican Observatory in Castel Gandolfo. One year later, in 2000, she visited the Institute for Advanced Study in Princeton, New Jersey, as an invited scientist.

In 2002, she was hired as a professor of astronomy and astrophysics in the Pennsylvania State University, where she worked until her death. During her tenure, she was appointed assistant department chair. However, she visited some universities during that period, among them, the University of Heidelberg, Germany, in 2013.

She was involved in one of the most important decisions of recent years while she was a member of the IAU in Prague where, in 2006, it was decided that Pluto would not be a planet anymore.

In 2011, Richards organized the IAU symposium in Slovakia, the first joint international meeting between binary star specialists. She also participated in programs of math and science enrichment for high-school students in Pennsylvania, Maryland, Michigan, New York, Vermont, Virginia and Toronto.

Richards served as an officer in some astronomical organizations, for example, as president of Commission 42 of the IAU, member of the Board of Advisers of the Caribbean Institute of Astronomy or councilor of the American Astronomical Society. Additionally, she was part of the Eberly College of Science’s Climate and Diversity Committee, an organization whose aim was to create a good environment for all members of the college.

On the other hand, she led multiple research studies in different parts of the world: at the Kitt Peak National Observatory in Arizona, at the Skalnaté Pleso Observatory, and in Lomnický štít, Slovakia, the South African Astronomical Observatory in Cape Town, the Spanish National Observatory in Madrid and the Teide Observatory in Tenerife.

Apart from that, she was committed to science, so she was involved in some programs to encourage people's engagement with it. In 2006, she and Jacqueline Bortiatynski, a chemistry lecturer, co-founded the Summer Experience at the Eberly College of Science. This six-week summer program was designed to engage low-income high school students in science research. She also participated in Exploration Day, a local event emphasizing practical science learning for families, and Penn State Astronomy's Astrofest and Astronight, annual events held to promote astronomy and science to families in the Central Pennsylvania area.

Richards was a mentor and an advocate for the promotion of young people, including women and other underrepresented groups, in physics and astronomy.

== Research ==
Her main research interests can be divided into three groups: computational astrophysics, stellar astrophysics, and exoplanets and brown dwarfs.

Among the investigations she carried out, the specialty of Richards's research is binary stars. A binary star is a system formed by two stars that were born at the same time and orbit around a common center. The stars, however, mature at different rates.

She was the first to use tomography in astronomy. At first, it was widely used in medicine or archeology, but Richards found the utility of this to test the gas-flow model that she created for her doctoral thesis. She used tomography to observe the binary system as it moves in relation to the Earth. This proves how the gas flows between the stars. As well as verifying the accuracy of her model, she could demonstrate that the gravity force acts in binary stars as the physical laws predicted. Richards also worked with a team of Russian scientists to continue with her studies about the gas flows between binary stars.

She was also a pioneer in making theoretical hydrodynamic simulations of the Algol binary stars, where the gas flows from one star and hits the surface of the other one. Additionally, she developed distance correlation methods to discover associations in large astrophysical databases.

Within the field of stellar astrophysics, she created three-dimensional "movies" of mass-exchange systems by scrutinizing spectroscopic and photometric time series of stars and compact objects in close orbit. This work could give important clues to the way mass transfer happens. Moreover, she researched the magnetic activity in cool stars and the Sun, and the effects of nearby interacting binary stars on optical interferometry.

== Awards and honors ==
In 2005, she was elected Honorary Member of the National Honor Society of Phi Eta Sigma in the Pennsylvania State University.

In 2008 the Institute of Jamaica bestowed on her the Musgrave Medal in Gold, its most important academic prize. This one, however, is not only an award given to scientists but also to artists and writers. Richards was the 14th scientist who received this medal.

In 2009, she received the Award for Outstanding Achievement in Astronomy & Astrophysics on St. Hugh's High School 110th Anniversary.

Three years later, in 2011, she received a Fulbright Distinguished Chair Research award from the Council for International Exchange of Scholars and the Slovak Fulbright Commission, which allowed her to research interacting binary stars at the Astronomical Institute of Slovakia in that same year.

In 2012, she was elected again as an Honorary Member of the Physics Honor Society, Sigma Pi Sigma in the Quadrennial Congress, Orlando.

In 2013 she was awarded the American Physical Society Woman Physicist of the Month Award.
