= John P. Allegrante =

American applied behavioral scientist and educator

John Philip Allegrante
- Born: March 8, 1952 (age 74); Poughkeepsie, New York, United States
- Occupation: University Professor

Academic background
- Education: State University of New York at Cortland (B.S.), University of Illinois at Urbana-Champaign (M.S., Ph.D.)

Academic work
- Institutions: Teachers College and the Mailman School of Public Health, Columbia University
- Main interests: Applied Behavioral and Social Sciences • Education • Health Promotion • Public Health

John Philip Allegrante (born March 8, 1952) is an American applied behavioral scientist and academic. He is the Charles Irwin Lambert Professor of Health Behavior and Education at Teachers College, the graduate school of education, health, and psychology at Columbia University, where he has been a member of the faculty since 1979.

== Early life and education ==
Allegrante was born at Poughkeepsie, New York, the son of John Ralph and Lois Elaine Allegrante, and grew up in Salt Point, a hamlet of Dutchess County, in New York's Hudson Valley.

He began his education in a one-room schoolhouse in Salt Point and later attended elementary, middle and high schools in the Hyde Park Central School District, graduating from Franklin D. Roosevelt High School in 1970. A first-generation college student, he initially attended a local community college and then went on to earn a B.S. degree in education with distinction from the State University of New York College at Cortland in 1974.

== Academic biography ==
Following graduation from Cortland, he enrolled for graduate study at the University of Illinois at Urbana-Champaign where he was funded as a graduate research and teaching assistant from 1974 to 1979, earning a M.S. degree in health education in 1976 and Ph.D. in health education and sociology in 1979. During his studies, Allegrante's father became seriously ill and the family ordeal of the cost of his father's hospitalization led him to write an essay about the impact of the high costs of medical care that was published on The New York Times Op-Ed page in April 1977. President Jimmy Carter read his essay and invited Allegrante to the White House where he met with Dr. Peter Bourne, then the special assistant to the President for health affairs, to discuss the dilemmas that working-class Americans face in paying medical bills. Allegrante has written about the experience, noting that it had an indelible impact on him and shaped his research interests in patient education and advocacy efforts for decades to come.

His dissertation research, "Explaining Safety Helmet Use by Motorcycle Operators Using a Behavioral Intention Model," which was subsequently published, was conducted under the guidance of the human factors psychologist Rudolf G. Mortimer and explored the social-psychological factors that influence voluntary helmet use. The eminent social psychologist, Martin Fishbein, whose theory he was testing, was a member of his doctoral committee. Allegrante has said that the tensions inherent in balancing private right with public good that were at the core of individual decisions to wear a helmet constitute an enduring dilemma of American democracy, and remain an underlying theme of many public health challenges, including those that came to light during the COVID-19 pandemic, such as wearing a mask, physically distancing, and accepting vaccination—all of which were among the initial public health directives that require changes in behavior.

Allegrante was admitted to a post-doctoral U.S. Public Health Service Traineeship at the Harvard School of Public Health following the completion of his doctorate. He was at Harvard about to begin his studies in the summer of 1979 when he was offered an assistant professorship at Teachers College, Columbia University. Forgoing the postdoctoral fellowship, he moved to New York and joined the faculty of the college in September of that year, becoming chairman of the Department of Health Education at the age of 28. He was promoted to associate professor in 1981, earned tenure shortly thereafter, and was subsequently promoted to full professor in 1993. Allegrante was named the inaugural Charles Irwin Lambert Professor of Health Behavior and Education in 2022. He holds joint faculty appointments in the Columbia University Graduate School of Arts and Sciences and Mailman School of Public Health.

In 1987, during a year long sabbatical leave from Columbia, Allegrante was a Pew Policy Career Development Fellow at the RAND/UCLA Center for Health Policy Study, where he studied with several RAND Health Insurance Experiment investigators. Following RAND, he began a 10-year research appointment as the chief behavioral scientist and educator in the NIH-funded Cornell Multipurpose Arthritis and Musculoskeletal Diseases Center at the Hospital for Special Surgery. His most notable contribution is the study of supervised fitness walking that he, his doctoral student Pamela Kovar and others conducted with funding support of the Arthritis Foundation. The seminal study, a randomized controlled trial of safety and efficacy, showed that fitness walking was a safe and efficacious non-surgical treatment in people with moderate to severe osteoarthritis of the knees. The findings, which were published in the Annals of Internal Medicine in 1992, established the evidence-base for walking and subsequently changed physician practice.

Beyond his contributions to NIH-funded research in the areas of clinical epidemiology and health services research and behavioral management of chronic diseases, Allegrante has also published widely in the prevention of adolescent substance use prevention and on professional preparation and workforce development in public health education. He has authored or coauthored over 200 peer-reviewed journal articles and numerous books and book chapters.

Allegrante has served on numerous advisory and review panels of the National Institutes of Health and other government agencies and foundations. He was appointed during the Obama administration to the Board of Scientific Counselors to the National Center for Injury Prevention and Control, a federal advisory committee that advises CDC.

== Global engagement ==
Allegrante is a globalist and has been engaged in several international collaborations that focus on understanding and improving human population health. During the mid-1990s, he led delegations of nursing and public health professionals for Health Volunteers Overseas to Vietnam as part of the Clinton Administration's U.S.-Vietnam reconciliation efforts to build capacity in the country's higher education sector. Later, as an Open Society Foundations International Scholar, he was a faculty member in the higher education support program in Central Asia. He worked with the Kazakhstan School of Public Health to strengthen capacity of junior faculty and has written about the public health policy challenges and priorities for Kazakhstan.

In 2005, he was selected to be a Fulbright Specialist in Public/Global Health and later, in 2007, a Fulbright U.S. Scholar in Iceland. There, he began a collaboration with Icelandic behavioral and social scientists who are researching the prevalence and prevention of substance use in Iceland and other Nordic and European countries. Allegrante has been collaborating as a senior investigator with a multidisciplinary team of behavioral and social scientists at Reykjavik University, who are studying child and adolescent health in a developmental life course study of the 2004 Icelandic birth cohort. Recent studies by the group, published in The Lancet Psychiatry and the JCCP Advances, have reported on the impact of COVID-19 on adolescent mental health. The research has been supported by grants from the U.S.-Icelandic Fulbright Commission, Icelandic Centre for Research and the European Research Council.

Allegrante has taught as a Fulbright visiting professor at Reykjavik University, where he now holds an Honorary Professorship in the Department of Psychology and as an Erasmus Programme visiting professor in the Europubhealth Programme at the École des Hautes Études en Santé Publique (EHESP French School of Public Health) in Rennes and at Mary Immaculate College in Limerick. He also has taught at Fudan University, Kiel University, and the University of Tokyo. A Fulbright Ambassador emeritus, he is a director and vice-chair of the board of One To World, a non-profit organization that is designated by the U.S. Department of State as the official coordinator of enrichment programs for visiting Fulbright grantees studying in the greater New York area.

He is the co-founder with Ulrich Hoinkes of Kiel University of the Anxiety Culture Project, a joint research project of Kiel University and Teachers College. Allegrante is the principal editor of the forthcoming book, Anxiety Culture: The New Global State of Human Affairs (Johns Hopkins University Press), which is based on the project.

== Administrative leadership ==
Allegrante became chairman of the Department of Health Education two years after arriving as a junior faculty member at Teachers College and went on to serve as chair of the department and founding director of the Center for Health Promotion throughout the early and mid-1980s. He became director of the larger Division of Health Services, Sciences, and Education in 1989 and served in that position until 1995. He returned to serve as chair of the Department of Health and Behavior Studies from 2007 to 2009 before subsequently serving as Deputy Provost of the college from 2009 to 2013 and as Associate Vice President for International Affairs from 2013 to 2019.

He served as 48th President of the Society for Public Health Education (SOPHE), 1997–98, and was editor of SOPHE's flagship research journal, Health Education & Behavior, from 2011 to 2018. As President of the National Center for Health Education during 2001–05, which was originally incorporated in New York under the Research Council of the Society for Public Health Education, he later oversaw the merger of the center's programs with SOPHE.

== Personal life ==
Allegrante is married to Andrea Joan (née Samuels) Allegrante. They met as students at Cortland and were married in 1976. They have a son who is married and one grandson.

== Awards and honors ==
- 2022 Honorary Professor, Department of Psychology, Reykjavik University
- 2017 CDC Foundation Elizabeth Fries Health Education Award for his contributions to the fields of behavioral science and health education as a researcher, academician, and ambassador
- 2015 Doctor of Humane Letters, Honoris Causa, State University of New York
- 2015 Mayhew Derryberry Award, American Public Health Association, Public Health Education and Health Promotion Section.
- 2015 Fellow, Society of Behavioral Medicine
- 2009-2013 International Scholar, Open Society Foundations
- 2007 Fulbright U.S. Scholar
- 2005 Fulbright Specialist in Public/Global Health
- 2003 Distinguished Career Award, American Public Health Association, Public Health Education and Health Promotion Section
- 2002 Health Education Mentor Award, Society for Public Health Education
- 1999 Distinguished Fellow Award, Society for Public Health Education
- 1985-88 National Fellow, W.K. Kellogg Foundation
- 1985 Fellow, New York Academy of Medicine

== Selected bibliography ==
=== Books ===
- Sloan, R. P., Gruman, J. C., & Allegrante, J. P. (1987). Investing in employee health: A guide to effective health promotion in the workplace. San Francisco: Jossey-Bass. (Japanese translation, published by Diamond Inc., Tokyo, Japan, 1992.)

=== Edited volumes ===
- Allegrante, J. P., Hoinkes, U., Schapira, M. I., & Struve, K. (In press). Anxiety culture: The new global state of human affairs. Baltimore: Johns Hopkins University Press.
- Allegrante, J. P., & Sleet, D. A. (Eds.). (2004). Derryberry's educating for health: A foundation for contemporary health education practice. San Francisco: Jossey-Bass.

=== Chapters ===
- Allegrante, J. P., & Peterson, J. C. (2022). Applications in health care settings. In Green, L. W., Gielen, A. C., Peterson, D. V., Kreuter, M. W., & Ottoson, J. M. (Eds.), Health program planning, implementation, and evaluation: Creating behavioral, environmental and policy change (pp. 361–389). Baltimore: Johns Hopkins University Press
- Robbins, R., DiClemente, R., Duncan, D. T., Zeepvat, J., & Allegrante, J. P. (2020). Wearable Devices for Health-Related Data. In J. Van den Bulck (Ed.), The International Encyclopedia of Media Psychology. John Wiley & Sons, Inc.
- Allegrante, J. P., Hyden, C., & Kristjansson, A. L. (2018). Research approaches of education, applied psychology, and behavioral science and their application to behavioral medicine. In E. B. Fisher, L. D. Cameron, A. J. Christensen, U. Ehlert, Y. Guo, B. Oldenburg, & F. J. Snoek (Eds.), Principles and concepts of behavioral medicine: A global handbook (pp. 137–179). New York: Springer Publishing.
- Buchanan, D. R., & Allegrante, J. P. (2008). Tensions between scientific and ethical considerations in evaluating public health proposals: What types of proposals should agencies be funding and what types of evidence should matter? Scientific and ethical considerations. In B. Wallace (Ed.), Toward equity in health: A new global approach to health disparities (pp. 81–96). New York: Springer Publishing, 2008.
- Allegrante, J. P., Marks, R., & Hanson, D. W. (2006). Ecological models for the prevention and control of unintentional injury. In A. C. Gielen, D. A. Sleet, & R. J. DiClemente, R. J. (Eds.), Injury and violence prevention: Behavioral science theories, methods, and applications (pp. 105–126). San Francisco: Jossey-Bass.
- Richardson, W. C., & Allegrante, J. P. (2001). Shaping the future of health through global partnerships. In C. E. Koop, C. E. Pearson, & M. R. Schwarz (Eds.). Critical issues in global health (pp. 375–383). San Francisco: Jossey-Bass.
- Allegrante, J. P. (1998). School-site health promotion for staff. In E. Marx, S. Wooley, & D. Northrup (Eds.), Health is academic: A guide to coordinated school health programs (pp. 224–243). New York: Teachers College Press.
- Michela, J. L., Lukaszewski, M. P., & Allegrante, J. P. (1995). Organizational climate and work stress: A general framework applied to inner-city school teachers. In S. L. Sauter & L. R. Murphy (Eds.), Organizational risk factors for job stress (pp. 61–79). Washington, DC: American Psychological Association.
- Allegrante, J. P., Goldfein, K. D., & Sloan, R. P. (1995). Ethical problems and related critical issues in worksite health promotion. In D. M. DeJoy & M. G. Wilson (Eds.), Critical issues in worksite health promotion (pp. 51–70). Boston: Allyn & Bacon.
- Charlson, M. E., Allegrante, J. P., & Robbins, L. (1993). Socioeconomic differentials in arthritis and its treatment. In D. E. Rogers & E. Ginzberg (Eds.), Medical care and the health of the poor (pp. 77–89). Boulder, CO: Westview Press.

=== Articles ===
- Albanese, N. N. Y., Lin, I., Friedberg, J. P., Lipsitz, S. R., Rundle, A., Quinn, J. W., Neckerman, K. M, Nicholson, A., Allegrante, J. P., Wyle-Rosett, J., & Natarajan, S. (2022). Association of the built environment and neighborhood resources with obesity-related health behaviors in older veterans with hypertension. Health Psychology. Advance online publication.
- Allegrante, J. P. (2018). Advancing the science of behavioral self-management of chronic disease. The arc of a research trajectory. Health Education & Behavior, 45, 6–13.
- Allegrante, J. P., & Green, L. W. (1981). When health policy becomes victim blaming. New England Journal of Medicine, 305, 1528–1529.
- Allegrante, J. P., Airhihenbuwa, C. O., Auld, M. E., Birch, D. A., Roe, K., & Smith, B. J. (2004). Toward a unified system of accreditation for professional preparation in health education: Final Report of the National Task Force on Accreditation in Health Education. Health Education & Behavior, 31, 668–683.
- Allegrante, J. P., Auld, M. E., & Natarajan, S. (2020). Preventing COVID-19 and its sequela: "There is no magic bullet . . . It's just behaviors." American Journal of Preventive Medicine, 59(2), 288–292.
- Allegrante, J. P., Barry, M. M., Airhihenbuwa, C. O., Auld, M. E., Collins, J. L., Lamarre, M.-C., Magnusson, G., McQueen, D. V., & Mittelmark, M., On Behalf of the Galway Consensus Conference. (2009). Domains of core competency, standards, and quality assurance for building global capacity in health promotion: The Galway Consensus Conference Statement. Health Education & Behavior, 36, 476–482.
- Allegrante, J. P., Wells, M. T., & Peterson, J. C. (2019). Interventions to support behavioral self-management of chronic diseases. Annual Review of Public Health, 40, 127–146.
- Green, L. W., & Allegrante, J. P. (2020). Practice-based evidence and the need for more diverse methods and sources in epidemiology, public health and health promotion. American Journal of Health Promotion, 34, 946–948.
- Kovar, P. A., Allegrante, J. P., MacKenzie, C. R., Peterson, M. G. E., Gutin, B., & Charlson, M. E. (1992). Supervised fitness walking in patients with osteoarthritis of the knee: A randomized, controlled trial. Annals of Internal Medicine, 116, 529–534.
- Marks, R., Allegrante, J. P., & Lorig, K. (2005). A review and synthesis of research evidence for self-efficacy-enhancing interventions for reducing chronic disability: Implications for health education practice (Part I). Health Promotion Practice, 6, 37–43.
- Nigg, C. R., Allegrante, J. P., & Ory, M. (2002). Theory-comparison and multiple-behavior research: Common themes advancing health behavior research. Health Education Research, 17, 670–679.
- Ogedegbe, G., Boutin-Foster, C., Wells, M. T., Allegrante, J. P., Isen, A. M., Jobe, J. B., & Charlson, M. E. (2012). Positive affect intervention improves medication adherence and blood pressure control in hypertensive African Americans. Archives of Internal Medicine, 172, 322–326.
- Rodriguez, M. A., Wang, B., Hyoung, S., Friedberg, J., Wylie-Rosett, J., Fang, Y., Allegrante, J. P., Lipsitz, S. R., & Natarajan, S. (2021). Sustained benefit of alternate behavioral interventions to improve hypertension control: A randomized clinical trial. Hypertension, 77(6), 1867–1876.
- Sigfusdottir, I. D., Kristjansson, A. L., & Allegrante, J. P. (2007). Health behaviour and academic achievement in Icelandic school children. Health Education Research, 22, 70–80.
- Sutter, C., Metcalfe, J. J., Tucker, L., Lohrmann, D. K., Koch, P. A., Allegrante, J. P., & DeSorbo-Quinn, A. (2019). Defining food education standards through consensus: The Pilot Light Food Education Summit. Journal of School Health, 89(12), 994–1003.
- Thorisdottir, I. E., Asgeirsdottir, B. B., Kristjansson, A. L., Valdimarsdottir, H. B., Allegrante, J. P., Jonsdottir Tolgyes, E. M., Sigfusson, J., Sigfusdottir, I. D., & Halldorsdottir, T. (2021). Adolescent depressive symptoms, mental well-being, and substance use in the wake of the COVID-19 pandemic: A population-based study. The Lancet Psychiatry, S2215-0366(21)00156-5. Advance online publication.
