= Swarathma =

Indian folk-fusion band

Swarathma ಸ್ವರಾತ್ಮ
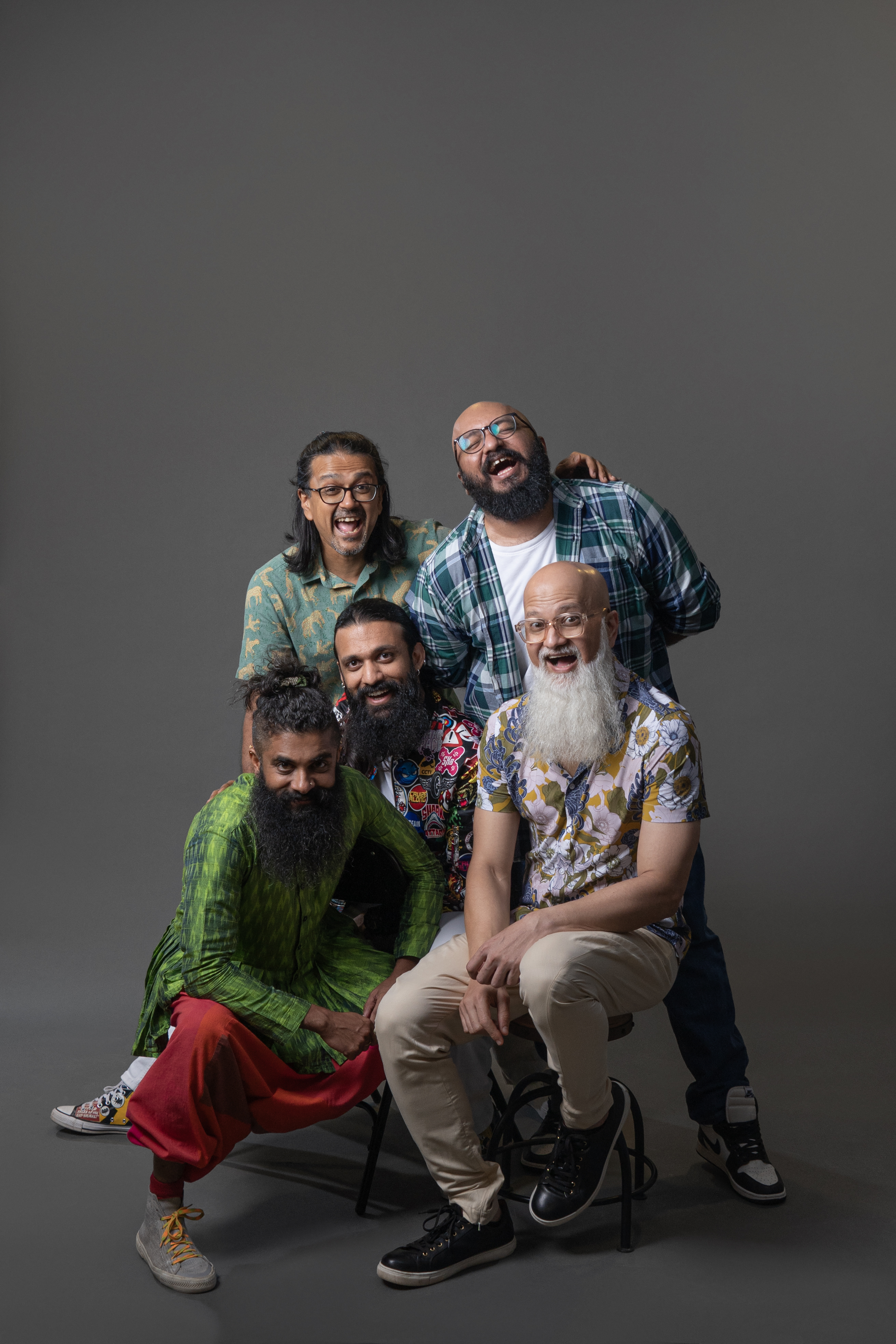
- Swarathma Press Photo 2024

Background information
- Origin: Mysore and Bangalore, India.
- Genre: Indian Folk/Fusion
- Years active: 2002 - present
- Label: Independent
- Members: Vasu Dixit; Sanjeev Nayak; Jishnu Dasgupta; Varun Murali; Vinay Ramakrishnan (touring)
- Past members: KJ Pavan; Joel Milan Baptist; Abhinanth Kumar; Arjun; Dheeraj Joseph; Montry Manuel
- Website: https://www.swarathma.com

Swarathma (Kannada:ಸ್ವರಾತ್ಮ) is a Bangalore (India)-based Indian Folk/fusion band. The current line-up features Vasu Dixit (vocals and rhythm guitar), Varun Murali (guitar and vocals), Sanjeev Nayak (violin and vocals) and Jishnu Dasgupta (bass guitar and vocals). The band's sound draws from Indian Folk and Classical Music, blending it with Western sounds like Blues rock and Reggae. Their lyrics are inspired by personal journeys as well as social and political themes.

Swarathma has released three full-length studio albums, the self-titled Swarathma (2009), Topiwalleh (2012) and Raah-e-Fakira (2018) as well as several singles and music videos. They were featured on the cover of Rolling Stone magazine's India edition as well on their list of 25 Hottest Indian Bands. They swept the annual Jack Daniels Indian Rock Awards 2009, winning Band, Song and Album of the Year. They have toured Morocco, the United Kingdom, Hong Kong, Australia and Singapore and are one of India's biggest folk rock bands.

== History ==
=== Formation and early years ===
Swarathma was formed in 2002 in Mysore when vocalist and songwriter Vasu Dixit met Abhinanth Kumar on guitars with the objective of creating original music. Joined by K J Pavan on percussions and Arjun on the violin, they were the original line-up. Dixit left in 2003 to pursue a Masters in Film and Video Communication from the National Institute of Design, Ahmedabad, leading to the band taking a two-year break, but regrouped in 2006 with Montry Manuel on drums.

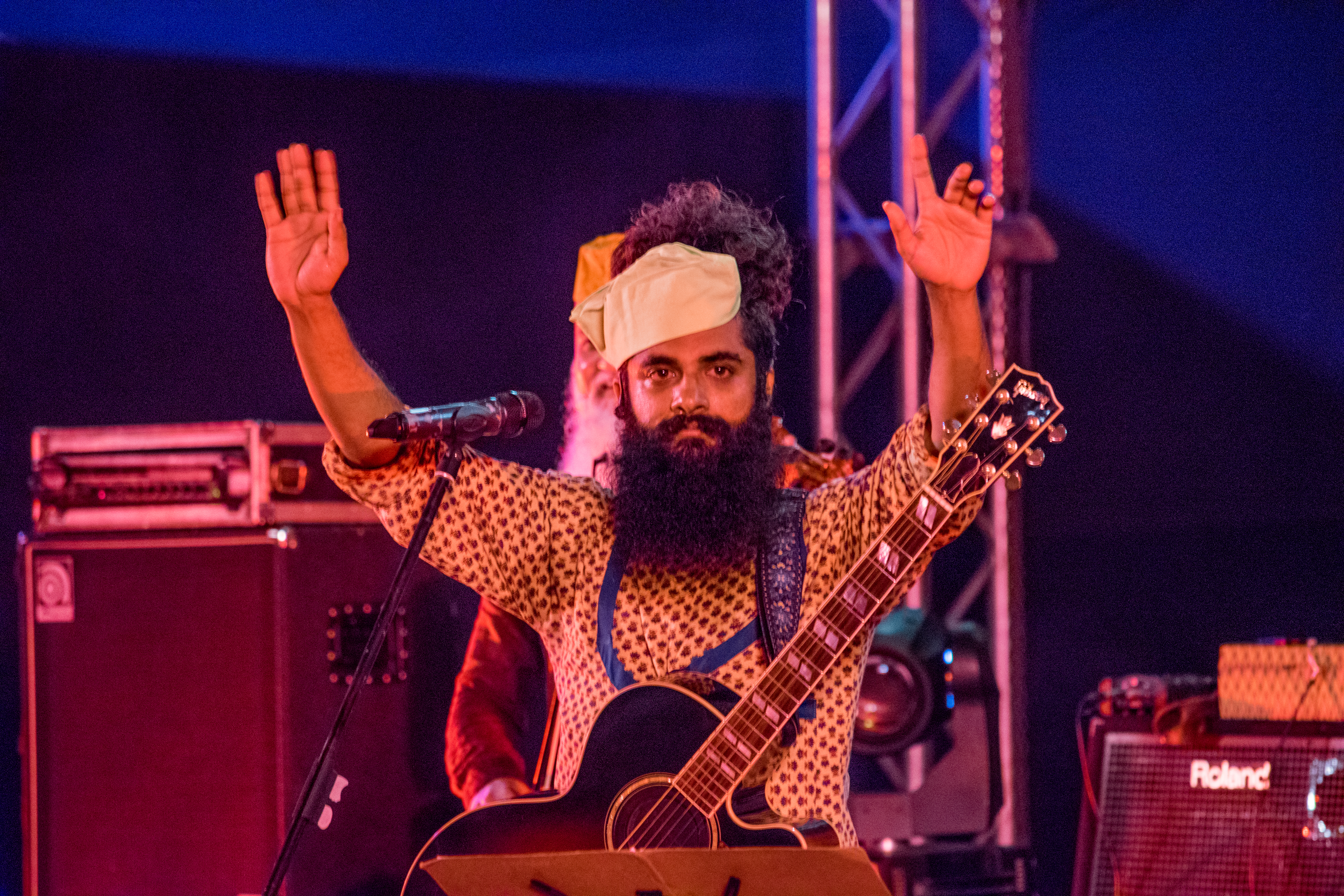
Vasu Dixit is the lead singer of Swarathma performing in a concert at New Delhi

The first break for Swarathma came when they won Radio City Live 2006, an SMS based contest for Bangalore's best band, conducted by the FM radio station Radio City on 30 September 2006. The fresh original sound of the band won them the contest coupled with the fact that they played a song "Ee Bhoomi" (This Earth) in Kannada. The show ended with a jam session with leading Indian rock band Parikrama. Swarathma continued to play shows in and around Bangalore, gaining popularity and building a fan-base, while searching for a record label who would release the band's music.

Owing to other professional commitments, Abhinanth, Arjun and guitar-player Dheeraj Joseph could not continue full-time with the band. Over the year 2007, they were joined by Sanjeev Nayak on the Violin, Varun on lead guitar and Jishnu Dasgupta on bass guitar who earlier played with the band bodhiTree, from XLRI Jamshedpur. The varying musical backgrounds of the members caused the music to evolve.

The new line-up played at various venues including the prestigious Mysore Yuva Dasara Habba, the celebrations of the Indian festival Dasara in November 2007. Sharing the stage with other noted artistes like Usha Uthup, and Sunidhi Chauhan the band was lauded for the strength of the compositions and on-stage energy.

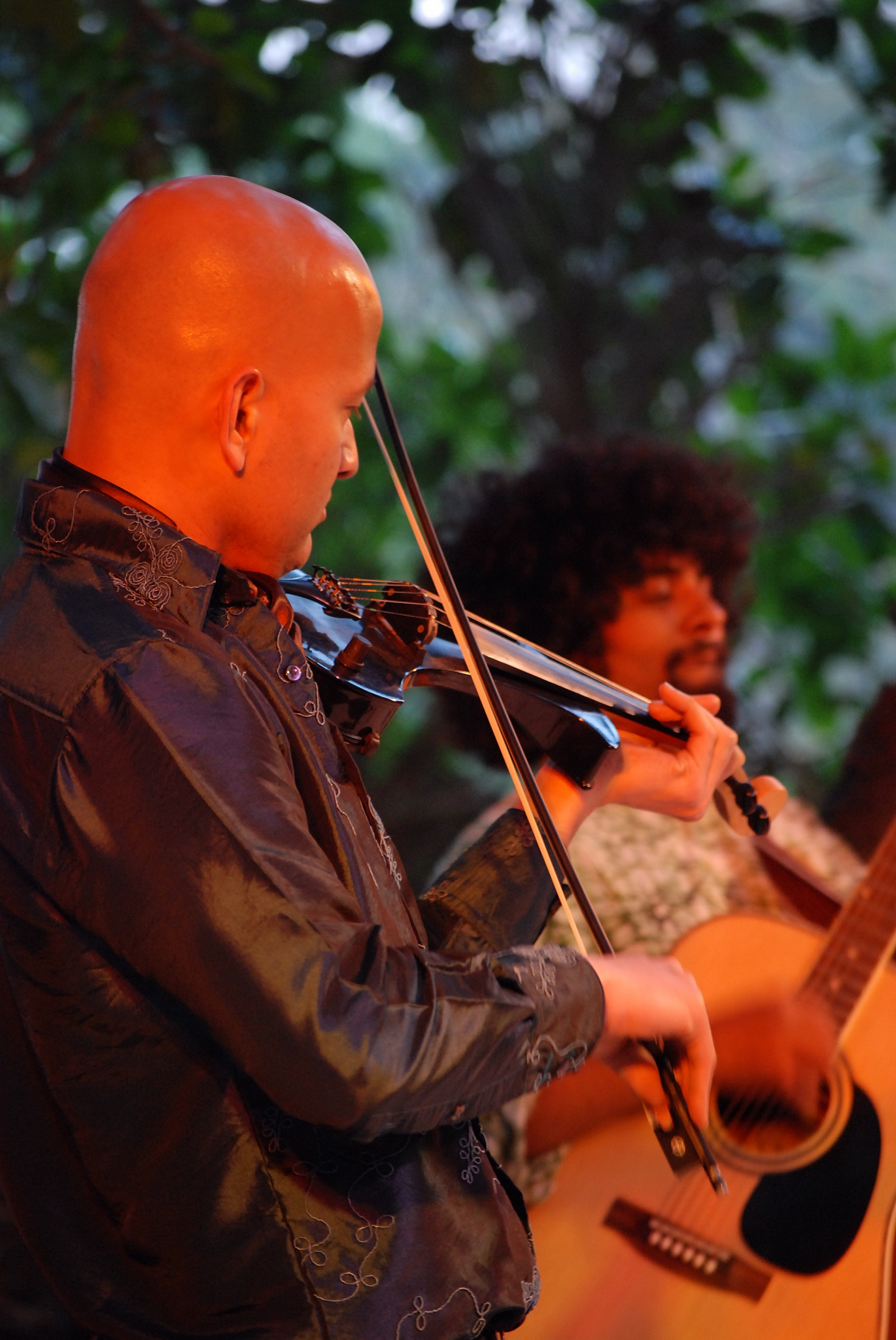
Sanjeev Nayak and Vasu Dixit at Fireflies Festival 2008

The band was nominated in three of the eight categories of the Jack Daniels Indian Rock Awards 2008, including Best Vocalist, Best Song and Best Album/EP.

This was the first time that a song in Kannada was nominated for such an award.

Swarathma also played at the Fireflies Festival of Sacred Music held off Kanakapura Road in Bangalore every year on 23 February 2008. They featured alongside artistes such as Oikotyaan in the night long festival.

=== The Swarathma debut album: breaking into the national scene ===
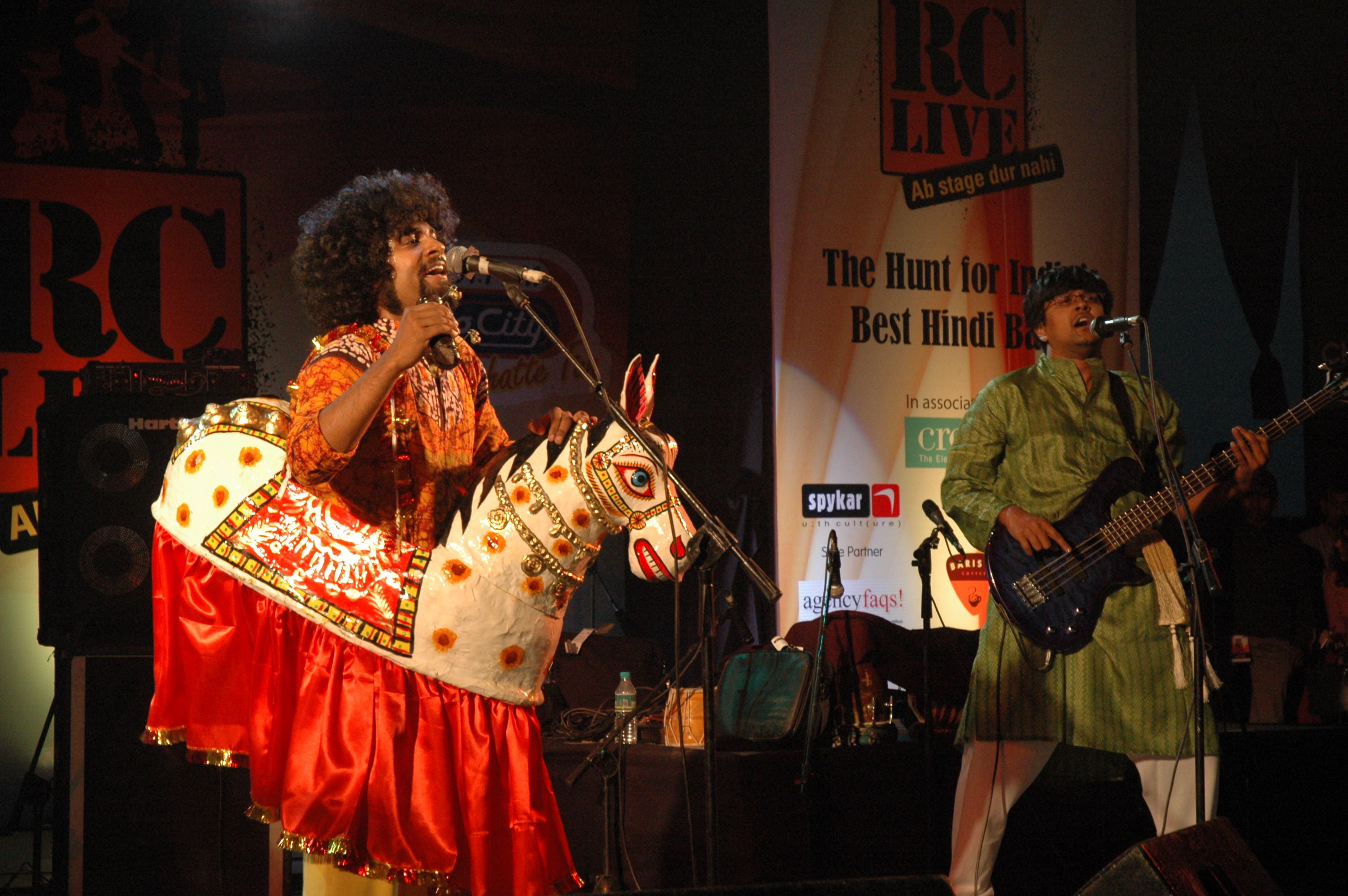
Vasu, his steed and Jishnu

In early 2008, Radio City re-launched Radio City Live, a nationwide hunt for India's best Hindi band. Selecting from over 100 entries from bands across India, Swarathma made it to the national finals with a winning performance.

The band flew to New Delhi for its first show outside Karnataka at the Garden of Five Senses. Pitted against six other top bands from across the country, Swarathma delivered a powerful performance that won them the Radio City Live title. In press interviews the band said that it was a combination of theatric showmanship and musical effort that brought them this honour., coupled with the fact that the onstage energy came from close relationships that band-members shared amongst themselves. Palash Sen of Euphoria, one of the judges of the event said, "This is the moment we've all been eagerly been waiting for - Swarathma being declared India's best Hindi Band!". This was one of the band's biggest moments.

Swarathma entered Kshitiz Studios, New Delhi in July 2008 to record their debut album with EMI Music India as part of winning RC Live with Amit Kilam as the producer. Being the drummer for Indian Ocean, a band that Swarathma had looked up to since formation, he was able to translate the band's vision onto the CD. However the recording took longer than expected with vocal parts being re-recorded in Bangalore over November 2008. It was mixed at Audio Track, Chennai and mastered by Ty Degroff at The Final Sound, Albuquerque, New Mexico, USA.

The debut album released on 5 January 2009 on Virgin Records to mostly positive reviews. The freshness of sound coupled with insightful, sensitive lyrics touching upon subjects as varied as India's economic regeneration and personal journeys made Rolling Stone magazine give it four stars and describe it as "the next level" of Indian rock. The band supported the album with an aggressive tour schedule playing at major Indian cities, despite a freak accident leading to Vasu's shoulder dislocation.

=== Soundpad album and international acclaim ===
In March 2008, Swarathma were chosen as one of the four Indian acts to be part of the India Soundpad Sessions, a project bringing together emerging artistes from India and UK's top producer John Leckie to collaborate and record together in a series of special studio sessions set to take place in India. Leckie was impressed by the band's brand of folk-infused indie-rock describing it as "celebratory, and totally unlike anything you would get in Britain". In October 2008, Swarathma entered the Yash Raj Studios with John Leckie and Massive Attack producer Dan Austin to record two tracks for a compilation album funded by the British Council.

It’s raucous, it’s fun, and even with the obvious language gap, songs like "Yeshu, Allah aur Krishna" are blindingly infectious... only terminal depression could make you ignore the sheer good vibes emanating from Swarathma.

— Rebecca McCormick, Tasty Fanzine, UK on Swarathma's tracks on the Soundpad album

The project also featured Indigo Children, Medusa and Advaita in an effort to showcase the Indian independent music scene. The album released in May 2009 to mixed reviews, however Swarathma received consistently positive feedback owing to the infectious live energy apparent on the recordings. In October 2009, the song "Jamba" from this compilation was picked up by the Music Alliance Pact featuring the top indie songs from 33 countries.

In May 2009 Swarathma went on a mini-tour of the UK in support of the Soundpad album, their first international tour. They played two showcases at The Great Escape Festival, one at The Arc and the other at Horatio's Bar on the Brighton Pier where they managed to get the largely British crowd sing along to Indian lyrics. Those exposed to Swarathma's theatrics-heavy stage act described it variously influenced by krautrock, garage punk and ska while reaffirming its earthy appeal.

=== Topiwalleh (2012) ===
With a slew of new songs written over the years Swarathma went into studios with producer Loy Mendonsa to record its second album titled Topiwalleh. The album featured darker overtones and a heavier sound

The band has not looked back since, wowing the audience with their spectacular Indian folk inspired stage show, their sound and their singing in mix of languages including Hindi, Kannada and English

— Lalitha Suhasini, Rolling Stone India, on the Topiwalleh album

that was positively received. The title song was actively used by the band to speak out against corruption in politics while other songs like 'Aaj ki Taaza Fikar' and 'Ghum' spoke about issues like media sensationalism and child sexual abuse. The band heavily toured with the album winning critical and popular acclaim across the country. Upon the release the band was featured on the cover of Rolling Stone. Following the release drummer Montry Manuel left the band to pursue his solo percussion project Thaalavattam.

== Social consciousness and activism ==
The band is socially conscious and have taken up causes such as discouraging the use of plastic by promoting cloth shopping bags made by Small Steps, a Puducherry based NGO.

In April 2009 they announced that they would be doing one free performance for the underprivileged, or for a cause, for every paid performance they did. This has led them to play at village courtyards and orphanages as well as in aid of NGOs such as the Indian Youth Climate Network organised Climate Solutions Road Tour and the Twestival Bangalore that raised INR 30,000 in one afternoon for Dream a Dream Foundation. They also supported the Green Idol campaign of Greenpeace in India by doing street shows to raise awareness about global climate change. In January 2010 they launched a series of concerts called Action Replay, which involves performances at venues for people who otherwise cannot access live contemporary music. They performed at the Sumanahalli Leprosy Rehabilitation Centre in Bangalore to raise awareness of a land dispute.

== Collaborative musical style ==
Swarathma is best known for a number of often spontaneous collaborations that they both release and perform live. Their song "Pyaasi" (The Thirsty) features the voice of Shubha Mudgal, with whom they also went on to co-write the song 'Duur Kinara'. They collaborated with Lebanese garage-blues act The Wanton Bishops to create a music video for their song 'Lay it on Me'. They re-versioned Ekla Chalo Re, Rabindranath Tagore's iconic song. They were a part of the global Power to the People project, bringing their Indian folk style to the international collaboration. Various artistes joined the band as guests in performances, notably saxophonist David Moskowicz of Lyon, France and Tavil player Raja of Bull Temple Road, Bangalore. Such varied instruments gave the band a sound unlike any other, while bringing together musicians from backgrounds so diverse that they could not converse with each other, not having a common language. Noted Indian pop-rock singer Rabbi Shergill also joined Swarathma on stage at the Nokia Music Connects Conference in September 2009.

== TV appearances ==
On 31 August 2008, Swarathma were featured in an NDTV India talk show called Salaam Zindagi, that featured well-known Indian bands like Parikrama and Indian Ocean. Swarathma spoke of their journey and plans for the future.

In early October 2008, Swarathma travelled to Singapore to perform at a pan-Asian talent showcase called Sutasi. Along with six other Indian acts, Swarathma shared the stage with bands, artists and songwriters from all over Asia. The reality series aired on Zee Cafe in India, and in Sri Lanka and South Korea in June–August 2009.

On 27 November 2011, Swarathma featured in the 7th episode of the Star World India series The Dewarists, collaborating with noted Hindustani classical music singer Shubha Mudgal. Together, they produced a track titled "Duur Kinara".

In August 2014, they were featured on Fox Life's SoundTrek, season 2.

In February 2016, the band was featured on MTV Unplugged, season 5.
