= Indian Youth Climate Network =

Indian organization

- Abbreviation: IYCN
- Formation: 2008
- Purpose: Youth representation
- Region served: India
- Official language: English
- Website: iycn.in

The Indian Youth Climate Network (IYCN) is a youth organization in India that aims to raise the voice of Indian youth on the global platform, as South Asia is one of the most vulnerable regions affected by climate change and environmental issues. Further, IYCN is motivated by global need in the Indian context to adopt mitigation and adaptation policy measure to combat climate change. It is part of the International Youth Climate Movement, which has the same acronym of IYCM.

IYCN members work to generate consensus on what role India should play in the global debate of climate change, and how it should address its domestic issues.

Started in 2008, IYCN was registered as an NGO in 2009. Today, IYCN has offices in six locations with chapters in the Indian states and has an outreach to thousands of youth in colleges, schools, corporations and institutions in India.

IYCN has "informed youth" as its leaders and program members who:

- Follow environmental and climate change policies and make recommendations at state, national and international platforms.
- Run campaigns aimed at public awareness on climate change impact & causes. In this process, the chapters mobilise and informing thousands of Indian citizens.
- Implement projects such as composting and community waste management, rural energy projects, lake clean-ups, and herbal and medicine gardens.

IYCN works at three levels:

- As a network of individuals enabling people to come together and work at a grassroots level, to form friendships and support each other.
- As a network of partner and supporter groups who bring together their strengths and passion for environment and sustainable development.
- As an organisation that runs its own programs/projects as well as participates in and supports programs/campaigns of other organisations.

== Background and history ==
There was a need for more representation of Indian youth in the 2007 United Nations Climate Change conference (UNFCCC) conference of the parties (COP) international climate negotiations that had been held in Bali, Indonesia.

The Indian Youth Climate Network was created in the following year, 2008. The organization started with attending a climate change & public survey of Delhi's Bus Rapid Transit (BRT) Corridor hosted by India's Centre for Science and Environment CSE. IYCN sent its first ever youth delegation of 8 members to COP14 in Poznan, Poland (2008). Since then, more than 80 members of IYCN have participated and contributed in key policy deliberations at COPs.

== Chapters ==
The Indian Youth Climate Network (IYCN) has several chapters across India.

== Projects ==
The organization has been working on the following initiatives.

- Agents of Change
- Rural Energy Project
- Climate Leadership Program
- Campus Climate Challenge
- Climate Solutions Road Tour

Climate Solutions Road Tour January 2, 2009 – February 4, 2009
Climate Solutions Road Tour flagged off at Chennai, India, January 2, 2009. Alexis Ringwald and Caroline Howe (both from Yale University) orchestrated the tour. All over India traveling to more than 15 cities where a group of 10 members of the Indian Youth Climate Network, a group of dancers from the Shiamak Davar dance group, solar powered band Solar Punch are traveling 3500 kilometers in solar plug-in electric cars, solar punch buggy and alternative-fueled truck. The road tour is one of the first initiatives towards sharing solutions in clean technology showcases, empowering youth in leadership training programs, and using art, dance and music by Solar Punch and other local musicians and artists to communicate the message.

The objective of the tour has been defined as:

"helping young people through this project by taking their ideas and implementing them for solutions to climate change. It's now time for action; to create, communicate and celebrate new ideas."

The road tour which began in Chennai on January 2, 2009, has covered 15 major cities including Bangalore, Hyderabad, Pune, Mumbai, Ahmedabad and Jaipur through to Delhi, covering more than 3,500 kilometres (2,200 mi) on solar-powered vehicles and electric cars REVA. The tour ended on 5 February 2009, at Delhi.

Agents of Change The program aims to send a delegation of Indian Young people which will strive to engage government delegations from around the world in policy, help build consensus amongst civil society groups and assist in the construction of a global youth climate network.

Climate Leadership Program The program aims to produce a group of youth who would lead grassroots climate groups in their communities; leaders who will organize and mobilize people; and leaders who will spread the message about the urgency of climate change. The Leadership Training for Campus Climate Changers is a full day interactive session on climate change, beginning with basic climate science and solutions and moving quickly into brainstorming on campus solutions, creating action plans for implementation, and media training to communicate successes.

Rural Energy Project The aim is to create a clean technology project in rural India that will reduce greenhouse gases, and work towards reducing the heating of the planet. The first rural energy project of IYCN is going to be implemented in the south Indian state of Tamil Nadu in a village called MGR Nagar on the outskirts of Coimbatore.

== EU - India Youth Climate Conclave ==
The Indian Youth Climate Network (IYCN) was a part of the launch programme of the EU-India Youth Climate Conclave. The Delegation of the European Union (EU) held the proposed Youth Climate Conclave as part of the 2020 World Sustainable Development Summit (WSDS).

== Publications ==
A CASE STUDY OF ENERGY DEMAND PROJECTS REGISTERED IN INDIA: USE OF HYPOTHESIS TESTING FOR BARRIER ANALYSIS EVALUATION, Abhijit Parashar, Indian Youth Climate Network

The Indian Youth Climate Network Submission to the UNFCCC 01 Nairobi work programme on impacts, vulnerability and adaptation to climate change (SBSTA): Submission under the area of socio-economic information

== See also ==
- Australian Youth Climate Coalition
- Canadian Youth Climate Coalition
- Energy Action Coalition
- Maldivian Youth Climate Network
- UK Youth Climate Coalition
- Youth Climate Movement
