= Jürgen Mulert =

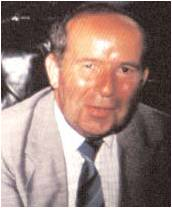
Jürgen Mulert

Jürgen Mulert (August 16, 1938 – December 28, 2008) was an economist, Fulbright scholar, and acting director general of the German-American Fulbright Program.

The "Mulert Memorial Award on Mutual Understanding" is granted annually in his honor.

== Early life and education ==
In 1948, Mulert and his family (father, mother, three brothers and an older sister) fled from East Germany and took refuge with the grandparents in Wiesbaden. Later the family moved to Herrenberg by Stuttgart, where Mulert earned his high school diploma in 1958. Afterwards he served four years in the German Military. From 1962 to 1967 he studied economics at the Rheinischen Friedrich-Wilhelms-Universität in Bonn. Afterwards he went to Fort Collins with a Fulbright Scholarship to Colorado State University, and he extended his stay with a teaching assistant position and earned his Ph.D. in Economics in 1972.

== Professional career ==
In 1973 the family moved to Heidelberg where Mulert taught Business Administration. His research focussed on the role of Robert Bosch as social entrepreneur. From 1975 to 1986 he was in charge of the German Program Unit at the German American Fulbright Commission in Bonn, in 1975/76 and 1980/81 Mulert served as Acting Director General. In 1987, Mulert moved to Frankfurt to work at the City University. In 1991, he founded the "Institut für Internationale Studien" in Erfurt, as well as the ‘Verein zur Förderung von Auslandskontakten’ in 1993. Both organizations aimed at improving intercultural communication.

== German Fulbright Alumni Association ==
Mulert was the initiator of the first Fulbright Alumni Association outside the US, based in Frankfurt, Germany. He inspired hundreds of former grantees, so that on January 24, 1986, the founding documents of the German Fulbright Alumni association were signed. The association nowadays has appr. 1.300 members from 30 countries.

== Legacy ==
As a former Fulbright Fellow, he believed in Senator J. William Fulbright's idea of "waging peace through understanding". Professionally, he supported thousands of students and professors before, during and after their academic exchange from and to the USA. In his personal life, he tirelessly campaigned for an improvement of transatlantic relations.

== Mulert Award ==
Since 2010, the annual "Juergen Mulert Memorial Award on Mutual Understanding" is granted to current or former participants of the Fulbright Program. The winners include Daniel Köhler, Janosch Delcker, Sherief El-Helaifi, The Atlantic Review, Oksana Buzhdygan, and Robert Lepenies.
