= Warren Binford =

American attorney, writer and international children's rights scholar

- Occupations: Law and Pediatrics professor

Academic background
- Education: Boston University; Harvard Law School

Academic work
- Institutions: Willamette University; University of Colorado

Warren Binford (born Wendi Warren Binford) is an American attorney, professor, writer, and international children’s rights scholar. She is a Professor and the inaugural W.H. Lea Endowed Chair for Justice in Pediatric Law, Policy & Ethics at the University of Colorado where she holds a tenured appointment as Professor of Pediatrics at the School of Medicine and a courtesy appointment as Professor of Law at the Law School. She is the Director of Law, Policy and Ethics at CU's Kempe Center for the Prevention and Treatment of Child Abuse and Neglect. From 2005 to 2021, she was a Professor of Law and Director of the Clinical Law Program at Willamette University where she founded Willamette’s Child and Family Advocacy Clinic to provide pro bono legal support for children and families.

== Education ==
She holds a bachelor of arts degree summa cum laude with distinction in literature and psychology, and a master's of education degree from Boston University. She was elected to Phi Beta Kappa honor society. She is also a graduate from Harvard Law School.

== Legal career ==
Binford worked for eight years at Pillsbury Winthrop Shaw Pittman LLP where her specialty was litigation and corporate transactions. Binford was Special Assistant Attorney General in Oregon from 2006-2011. Binford has practiced law in California and Oregon. She has provided legal expertise to Save the Children, the International Red Cross, the International Criminal Court, the Japanese Red Cross Society, the Croatian Red Cross, and the Dutch National Rapporteur on Human Trafficking and Sexual Violence against Children. She is in the bar for the U.S. District Court, Eastern and Northern Districts of California, the Ninth Circuit Court of Appeals and the U.S. Supreme Court. She has also served as a middle school teacher in South Central LA and as a Court Appointed Special Advocate.

From 2017 to 2020, Binford interviewed children and families at detention centers along the U.S.-Mexican border under the Flores Settlement. She started a GoFundMe to raise money for other volunteers to document the children's experiences and co-funded Project Amplify to raise public awareness about the mistreatment of children arriving to the U.S. At the border she was critical of the conditions the migrant children were being held, later conducting interviews on the subject describing what she witnessed and the children's rights violations documented by the interviewing teams.

== Research ==
Throughout her career, Binford has written approximately 80 publications including law review articles, book chapters, and essays such as "Beyond Paroline: Ensuring meaningful remedies for child pornography victims at home and abroad" and "The Constitutionalization of Children's Rights in South Africa".

As a Fulbright scholar in South Africa and as a Fulbright Canada-Palix Foundation Distinguished Visiting Chair in Canada, Binford conducted research related to children's rights. More specifically, in 2015 Binford's work pertained to brain science research with a focus on the effects of child pornography on victims. In 2017 Binford presented a related TED Talk titled "Sex, Porn, & Manhood" explaining her research on the impact of extreme internet pornography on a child's development. In 2014, in conjunction with her work with the Willamette Child and Family Advocacy Clinic, Binford conducted research on immigrant children, specifically those crossing the border alone who were in need of legal representation. In 2021, Binford co-published Hear My Voice/Escucha Mi Voz, an award-winning children's book describing the experiences of children arriving to the United States in their own words.

== News coverage ==
In June 2019, Binford visited the U.S. Customs and Border Protection facility in Clint, Texas, in order to assess conditions at the immigrant detention center there. Following this, Binford reported to the public the conditions within this detention center, alleging the unlawful mistreatment of migrant children. Her reports led to national backlash against U.S. Customs and Border Protection and the eventual resignation of John P. Sanders, the agency director.

== Awards ==
2012 Fulbright Scholar at the University of the Western Cape in Bellville, South Africa

2015 Inaugural chair-holder of the Fulbright Distinguished Visiting Research Chair in Brain Science and Family Wellness at the University of Calgary, Canada

2020 Woman of Influence, Portland Business Journal

2020 Hans Linde Award, American Constitution Society

2021 Inaugural W.H. Lea Endowed Chair for Justice in Pediatric Law, Policy & Ethics, University of Colorado
