= Fulbright Program =

American educational grant program

- Awarded for: Grants for U.S. professors ("scholars"), graduating college seniors and graduate students ("students"), young professionals ("specialists"), and artists to research, study, or teach English abroad
- Sponsored by: Bureau of Educational and Cultural Affairs at the U.S. Department of State
- Established: August 1946 (80 years ago)
- Website: fulbrightprogram.org

The Fulbright Program, including the Fulbright–Hays Program, is one of several United States cultural exchange programs with the goal of improving intercultural relations, cultural diplomacy, and intercultural competence between the people of the United States and other countries through the mutual exchange of persons, knowledge, and skills. The program was founded by United States senator J. William Fulbright in 1946, and has been considered to be one of the most prestigious scholarships in the United States.

The program allows both competitively selected American citizens (including students, scholars, teachers, professionals, scientists, and artists) to receive scholarships or grants to study, conduct research, teach, or exercise their talents abroad; and citizens of other countries to do the same in the United States. The program provides approximately 8,000 grants annually, comprising roughly 1,600 grants to U.S. students, 1,200 to U.S. scholars, 4,000 to foreign students, 900 to foreign visiting scholars, and several hundred to teachers and professionals.

The Fulbright Program is administered by cooperating organizations such as the Institute of International Education and operates in over 160 countries around the world. The Bureau of Educational and Cultural Affairs of the U.S. Department of State sponsors the Fulbright Program and receives funding from the United States Congress via annual appropriation bills. Additional direct and in-kind support comes from partner governments, foundations, corporations, and host institutions both in and outside the U.S. In 49 countries, a bi-national Fulbright Commission administers and oversees the Fulbright Program. In countries that have an active program but no Fulbright Commission, the Public Affairs Section of the U.S. embassy oversees the Fulbright Program. More than 370,000 people have participated in the program since it began: of these alumni, 63 have been awarded a Nobel Prize, and 93 have won Pulitzer Prizes.

== History ==
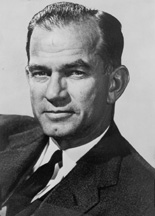
J. William Fulbright, U.S. Senator (D-AR), the program's founder

=== Founding ===
The Fulbright Program's mission is to bring a little more knowledge, a little more reason, and a little more compassion into world affairs and thereby increase the chance that nations will learn at last to live in peace and friendship.

— Senator J. William Fulbright

In 1945, Senator J. William Fulbright proposed a bill to use the proceeds from selling surplus U.S. government war property to fund international exchange between the U.S. and other countries. With the crucial timing of the aftermath of the Second World War and with the pressing establishment of the United Nations, the Fulbright Program was an attempt to promote peace and understanding through educational exchange. The bill devised a plan to forgo the debts foreign countries amassed during the war in return for funding an international educational program. A detailed proposal was first considered by the State Department on 1 March 1946. It was through the belief that this program would be an essential vehicle to promote peace and mutual understanding between individuals, institutions and future leaders wherever they may be.

In August 1946, Congress created the Fulbright Program in what became the largest education exchange program in history. The program was expanded by the Mutual Educational and Cultural Exchange Act of 1961, introduced by Representative Wayne Hays and known as Fulbright–Hays Act. It made possible participation in international fairs and expositions, including trade and industrial fairs; translations; funding for American studies programs; funds to promote medical, scientific, cultural, and educational research and development; and modern foreign language training.

The program operates on a bi-national basis; each country has entered into an agreement with the U.S. government. The first countries to sign agreements were China in 1947 and Burma, the Philippines, and Greece in 1948.

Originally, the program was administered by the Council for International Exchange of Scholars, but in 1996 these responsibilities were transferred to the Institute of International Education.

=== Program terminations ===
In July 2020, Fulbright programs in China and Hong Kong were terminated by President Donald Trump thorugh Executive Order 13936.

In March 2024, the Russian government declared the Institute of International Education (IIE) and Cultural Vistas as "undesirable" in Russia. This decision effectively ended the Fulbright Program in Russia, which had been established in the USSR during the 1973–74 academic year.

In February 2025, the Trump administration initiated a funding freeze on State Department programs, including the Fulbright Program, disrupting financial support for thousands of scholars. The suspension impacted over 19,000 participants. The freeze was gradually lifted at the end of March 2025.

=== 2025 board resignations and political interference ===
On June 11, 2025, eleven of the twelve members of the J. William Fulbright Foreign Scholarship Board resigned in protest, citing what they described as "unlawful" political interference by the Trump administration. The board, which provides oversight for the international Fulbright exchange program, alleged that political appointees at the U.S. Department of State blocked or delayed awards for the 2025–26 academic year and subjected more than 1,200 foreign finalists to unauthorized ideological screening. The board's open letter stated that review criteria were improperly influenced by applicants' positions on topics such as climate change, race, and gender.

The resignations prompted concern from higher education leaders and U.S. lawmakers. Senator Jeanne Shaheen of New Hampshire stated that the alleged interference "politicizes one of our most respected international education programs" and could harm the U.S.'s global academic credibility.

== Program ==
Countries with active bilateral Fulbright Student and Fulbright Scholar programs with the US (as of 2020). Light shading indicates countries with just Fulbright Scholar programs. (Mainland China and Hong Kong Fulbright programs were terminated by means of presidential executive order on July 13, 2020) East Asia and the Pacific Europe and Eurasia Middle East and North Africa South and Central Asia Sub-Saharan Africa Western Hemisphere

Educational exchange can turn nations into people, contributing as no other form of communication can to the humanizing of international relations.

— Senator J. William Fulbright

The Fulbright Program exchanges scholars and students with numerous countries in bilateral partnerships managed by commissions for each country. It provides funding for U.S. persons to visit other countries in the U.S. Student Program, U.S. Scholar Program, Teacher Exchange Program, and others, and enables foreign nationals to visit the United States in programs such as the Foreign Student Program, Visiting Scholar Program, Teacher Exchange Program.

Candidates recommended for Fulbright grants have high academic achievement, a compelling project proposal or statement of purpose, demonstrated leadership potential, and flexibility and adaptability to interact successfully with the host community.

Fulbright grants are awarded in almost all academic disciplines, except clinical medical research involving patient contact. Fulbright grantees' fields of study span the fine arts, humanities, social sciences, mathematics, natural and physical sciences, and professional and applied sciences.

=== Student grants ===
- The Fulbright Degree Program funds graduate education for international students wanting to study in the United States. Students apply for the scholarship in their home country and after a long process, they can pursue a Masters or Ph.D. program in the United States.
- The Fulbright U.S. Student Program offers fellowships for U.S. graduating college seniors, graduate students, young professionals, and artists to research, study, or teach English abroad for one academic year. The program facilitates cultural exchange through direct interaction on an individual basis in the classroom, field, home, and in routine tasks, allowing the grantee to gain an appreciation of others' viewpoints and beliefs, the way they do things, and the way they think. The application period opens in the spring of each year. Since the inaugural class in 1949, Harvard, Yale, Berkeley, Columbia, and Michigan have been the top producers of U.S. Student Program scholars. Michigan has been the leading producer since 2005.

Top 10 producers	Scholars (all-time)	Scholars (since 2005)
Harvard University	1,450	410
Yale University	1,208	372
University of California, Berkeley	1,002	306
Columbia University	1,001	327
University of Michigan	939	450
Princeton University	896	299
Stanford University	809	289
University of Wisconsin–Madison	805	225
University of Chicago	769	354
Brown University	716	391

- The Fulbright Foreign Student Program enables graduate students, young professionals, and artists from abroad to conduct research and study in the United States. Some scholarships are renewed after the initial year of study.
- The Fulbright Foreign Language Teaching Assistant Program provides opportunities for young English teachers from overseas to refine their teaching skills and broaden their knowledge of U.S. culture and society while strengthening the instruction of foreign languages at colleges and universities in the United States.
- The International Fulbright Science and Technology Award, a component of the Fulbright Foreign Student Program, supports doctoral study at leading U.S. institutions in science, technology, engineering or related fields for outstanding foreign students. This program is currently on hiatus.
- The Fulbright-mtvU Fellowships award up to four U.S. students the opportunity to study the power of music as a cultural force abroad. Fellows conduct research for one academic year on projects of their own design about a chosen musical aspect. They share their experiences during their Fulbright year via video reports, blogs, and podcasts.
- The Fulbright-Clinton Fellowship provides the opportunity for U.S. students to serve in professional placements in foreign government ministries or institutions to gain hands-on public sector experience in participating foreign countries.
- The Fulbright Schuman Program awards scholarships to American citizens for research in the European Union with a focus on EU affairs/policy, or the US-EU transatlantic agenda.

=== Scholar grants ===
- The Fulbright Distinguished Chair Awards comprise approximately forty distinguished lecturing, distinguished research and distinguished lecturing/research awards ranging from three to 12 months. Fulbright Distinguished Chair Awards are viewed as among the most prestigious appointments in the U.S. Fulbright Scholar Program. Candidates should be eminent scholars and have a significant publication and teaching record.
- The Fulbright U.S. Scholar Program sends U.S. faculty members, scholars, and professionals abroad to lecture or conduct research for up to a year.
- The Fulbright Specialist Program sends U.S. academics and professionals to serve as expert consultants on curriculum, faculty development, institutional planning, and related subjects at overseas institutions for a period of two to six weeks.
- The Fulbright Visiting Scholar Program and Fulbright Scholar-in-Residence Program bring foreign scholars to lecture or conduct post-doctoral research for up to a year at U.S. colleges and universities.
- The Fulbright Regional Network for Applied Research (NEXUS) Program is a network of junior scholars, professionals, and mid-career applied researchers from the United States, Brazil, Canada, and other Western Hemisphere nations in a year-long program that includes multi-disciplinary, team-based research, a series of three seminar meetings, and a Fulbright exchange experience.

=== Teacher grants ===
Fulbright Teacher Exchanges support exchanges of teachers from K–12 schools and a small number of post-secondary institutions.

The Distinguished Fulbright Awards in Teaching Program sends teachers abroad for a semester to pursue individual projects, conduct research, and lead master classes or seminars.

=== Grants for professionals ===
The Hubert H. Humphrey Program brings outstanding mid-career professionals from the developing world and societies in transition to the United States for one year. Fellows participate in a non-degree program of academic study and gain professional experience.

The Fulbright U.S. Scholar Program sends American scholars and professionals abroad to lecture or conduct research for up to a year.

The Fulbright Specialist Program sends U.S. faculty and professionals to serve as expert consultants on curriculum, faculty development, institutional planning, and related subjects at overseas academic institutions for a period of two to six weeks.

The Fulbright U.S. Student Program offers fellowships for U.S. graduating seniors, graduate students, young professionals and artists to study abroad for one academic year. The program also includes an English Teaching Assistant component.

The Fulbright Foreign Student Program enables graduate students, young professionals and artists from abroad to conduct research and study in the United States. Some scholarships are renewed after the initial year of study.

=== Fulbright–Hays Program ===
The Fulbright–Hays Program is a component of the Fulbright Program funded by a congressional appropriation to the United States Department of Education. It awards grants to individual U.S. K through 14 pre-teachers, teachers and administrators, pre-doctoral students, and post-doctoral faculty, as well as to U.S. institutions and organizations. Funding supports research and training efforts overseas, which focus on non-western foreign languages and area studies. Four Fulbright–Hays grants currently make awards: Fulbright-Hays Doctoral Dissertation Research Abroad, Fulbright–Hays Faculty Research Abroad, Fulbright–Hays Group Projects Abroad and Fulbright–Hays Seminars Abroad.

Fulbright–Hays Doctoral Dissertation Research Abroad fellowships provide grants to U.S. colleges and universities to fund individual doctoral students who conduct research in other countries, in modern foreign languages and area studies for periods of 6–12 months. Fulbright–Hays Faculty Research Abroad fellowships provide grants to U.S. colleges and universities to fund individual faculty who conduct research in other countries, in modern foreign languages and area studies for periods of 3–12 months. Fulbright–Hays Group Projects Abroad provides grants to support overseas projects in training, research, and curriculum development in modern foreign languages and area studies for teachers, students, and faculty engaged in a common endeavor, including short-term seminars, curriculum development, group research or study, or advanced intensive language programs. Fulbright–Hays Seminars Abroad provides individual U.S. educators and administrators opportunities to go abroad as part of a group in the summer to participate in immersive educational and cultural activities and thereby improve their understanding of the peoples and cultures of other countries. Based on their seminar experiences, participants develop cross-cultural curricula for their home educational contexts.

== Administration ==
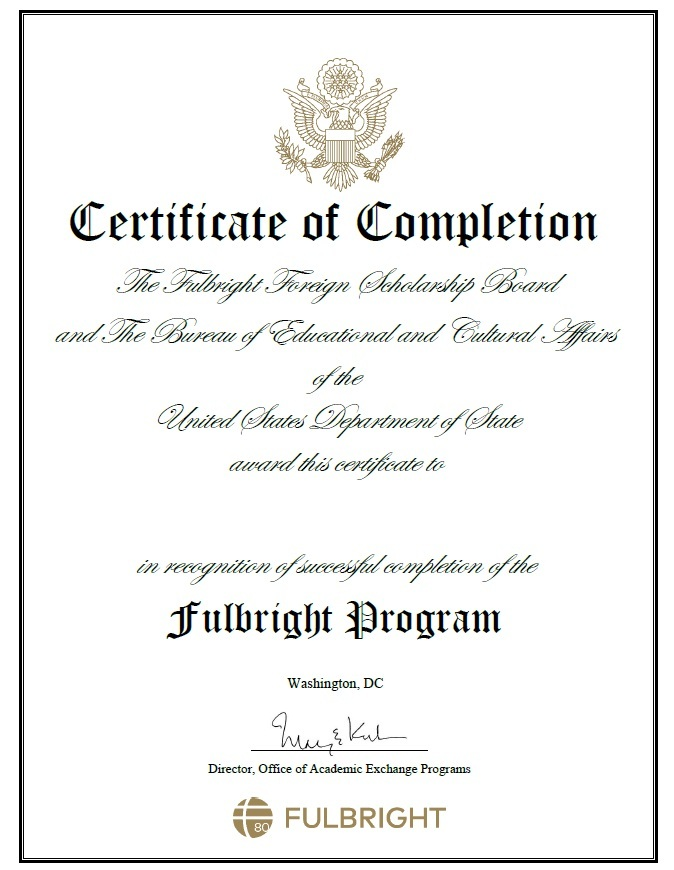
Certificate issued for completion of the Fulbright Program

The program is coordinated by the Bureau of Educational and Cultural Affairs (ECA) of the U.S. Department of State under policy guidelines established by the Fulbright Foreign Scholarship Board (FSB), with the help of 50 bi-national Fulbright commissions, U.S. embassies, and cooperating organizations in the U.S.

The United States Department of State is responsible for managing, coordinating and overseeing the Fulbright program. Bureau of Educational and Cultural Affairs is the bureau in the Department of State that has primary responsibility for the administration of the program.

The United States Department of Education is responsible for managing, coordinating and overseeing the Fulbright–Hays program.

The Fulbright Foreign Scholarship Board is a twelve-member board of educational and public leaders appointed by the president of the United States that determines general policy and direction for the Fulbright Program and approves all candidates nominated for Fulbright Scholarships.

Bi-national Fulbright commissions and foundations, most of which are funded jointly by the U.S. and partner governments, develop priorities for the program, including the numbers and categories of grants. More specifically, they plan and implement educational exchanges, recruit and nominate candidates for fellowships; designate qualified local educational institutions to host Fulbrighters; fundraise; engage alumni; support incoming U.S. Fulbrighters; and, in many countries, operate an information service for the public on educational opportunities in the United States.

In a country active in the program without a Fulbright commission, the Public Affairs Section of the U.S. Embassy administers the Fulbright Program, including recruiting and nominating candidates for grants to the U.S., overseeing U.S. Fulbrighters on their grant in the country, and engaging alumni.

Established in 1919 in the aftermath of World War I, the Institute of International Education was created to catalyze educational exchange. In 1946, the U.S. Department of State invited IIE to administer the graduate student component and CIES to administer the faculty component of the Fulbright Program—IIE's largest program to date.

AMIDEAST administers Fulbright Foreign Student grants for grantees from the Middle East and North Africa, excluding Israel.

LASPAU: Affiliated with Harvard University. LASPAU is an organization that connects individuals, institutions and organizations in the Americas in the field of education. Among other functions, LASPAU administers the Junior Faculty Development Program, a part of the Fulbright Foreign Student Program, for grantees from Central and South America and the Caribbean.

World Learning administers the Fulbright Specialist Program.

American Councils for International Education (ACTR/ACCELS) administers the Junior Faculty Development Program (JFDP), a special academic exchange for grantees from the Caucasus, Central Asia, and Southeast Europe.

IREX administers Fulbright Teacher Exchanges.

== Related organizations ==
The Fulbright Association is an organization independent of the Fulbright Program and not associated with the U.S. Department of State. The Fulbright Association was established on February 27, 1977, as a private nonprofit, membership organization with over 9,000 members. Arthur Power Dudden was its founding president. He wanted alumni to educate members of the U.S. Congress and the public about the benefits of advancing increased mutual understanding between the people of the United States and those of other countries. In addition to the Fulbright Association in the U.S., independent Fulbright Alumni associations exist in over 75 countries around the world.

The Fulbright Academy was an organization independent of the Fulbright Program and not associated with the U.S. Department of State. A non-partisan, non-profit organization with members worldwide, the Fulbright Academy focused on the professional advancement and collaboration needs among the 100,000+ Fulbright alumni in science, technology, and related fields. It merged into the Fulbright Association in 2013.

== Bilateral commissions ==
The Fulbright Program has commissions in 49 of the over 160 countries with which it has bilateral partnerships. These foundations are funded jointly by the U.S. and partner governments. The role of the Fulbright Commissions is to plan and implement educational exchanges; recruit and nominate candidates, both domestic and foreign, for fellowships; designate qualified local educational institutions to host Fulbrighters; and support incoming U.S. Fulbrighters while engaging with alumni. Below is a list of current commissions.

Region	Country	Commission
East Asia and the Pacific	Australia	The Australian-American Fulbright Commission
East Asia and the Pacific	Indonesia	American-Indonesian Exchange Foundation
East Asia and the Pacific	Japan	Japan-United States Educational Commission
East Asia and the Pacific	Korea	Korean-American Educational Commission
East Asia and the Pacific	Malaysia	Malaysian-American Commission on Educational Exchange
East Asia and the Pacific	New Zealand	New Zealand-United States Educational Foundation
East Asia and the Pacific	The Philippines	Philippine-American Educational Foundation
East Asia and the Pacific	Taiwan	Foundation for Scholarly Exchange
East Asia and the Pacific	Thailand	Thailand-U.S. Educational Foundation
Europe and Eurasia	Austria	Austrian-American Educational Commission
Europe and Eurasia	Belgium	Commission for Educational Exchange Between the United States, Belgium and Luxembourg
Europe and Eurasia	Bulgaria	Bulgarian-American Commission for Educational Exchange
Europe and Eurasia	Czech Republic	J. William Fulbright Commission for Educational Exchange in the Czech Republic
Europe and Eurasia	Denmark	Fulbright Denmark
Europe and Eurasia	Finland	Fulbright Finland Foundation
Europe and Eurasia	France	Franco-American Commission for Educational Exchange
Europe and Eurasia	Georgia	Fulbright Georgia
Europe and Eurasia	Germany	German-American Fulbright Commission
Europe and Eurasia	Greece	U.S. Educational Foundation in Greece
Europe and Eurasia	Hungary	Hungarian-American Commission for Educational Exchange
Europe and Eurasia	Iceland	Iceland-United States Educational Commission
Europe and Eurasia	Ireland	The Ireland-United States Commission for Educational Exchange
Europe and Eurasia	Italy	The U.S.-Italy Fulbright Commission
Europe and Eurasia	Netherlands	Fulbright Commission the Netherlands
Europe and Eurasia	Norway	U.S.-Norway Fulbright Foundation for Educational Exchange
Europe and Eurasia	Poland	Polish-U.S. Fulbright Commission
Europe and Eurasia	Portugal	Commission for Educational Exchange Between the United States of America and Portugal
Europe and Eurasia	Romania	Romanian-U.S. Fulbright Commission
Europe and Eurasia	Slovakia	J. William Fulbright Commission for Educational Exchange in the Slovak Republic
Europe and Eurasia	Spain	Commission for Cultural, Educational and Scientific Exchange Between the United States of America and Spain
Europe and Eurasia	Sweden	Commission for Educational Exchange between the United States and Sweden
Europe and Eurasia	Turkey	Commission for Educational Exchange Between the United States of America and Turkey
Europe and Eurasia	United Kingdom	The United States-United Kingdom Fulbright Commission
Middle East and North Africa	Egypt	The Binational Fulbright Commission in Egypt
Middle East and North Africa	Israel	U.S.-Israel Educational Foundation (USIEF)
Middle East and North Africa	Jordan	Jordanian-American Commission for Educational Exchange (JACEE)
Middle East and North Africa	Morocco	Moroccan-American Commission for Educational and Cultural Exchange
South and Central Asia	India	United States-India Educational Foundation
South and Central Asia	Nepal	Commission for Educational Exchange between the United States and Nepal (USEF/Nepal)
South and Central Asia	Pakistan	United States Educational Foundation in Pakistan
South and Central Asia	Sri Lanka	United States-Sri Lanka Fulbright Commission
Western Hemisphere	Argentina	Commission for Educational Exchange Between the United States and the Argentine Republic
Western Hemisphere	Brazil	Commission for Educational Exchange between the United States of America and Brazil
Western Hemisphere	Canada	Foundation for Educational Exchange Between Canada and the United States of America
Western Hemisphere	Chile	Commission for Educational Exchange Between the United States of America and Chile
Western Hemisphere	Colombia	Commission for Educational Exchange Between the United States of America and Colombia
Western Hemisphere	Ecuador	Commission for Educational Exchange Between the United States of America and Ecuador
Western Hemisphere	Mexico	Mexico-United States Commission for Educational and Cultural Exchange
Western Hemisphere	Peru	Commission for Educational Exchange Between the United States and Peru
Western Hemisphere	Uruguay	Fulbright Uruguay

== Notable alumni ==
Fulbright alumni have occupied key roles in government, academia, and industry. Of the more than 325,000 alumni:

- 93 have received the Pulitzer Prize.
- 80 have been MacArthur Fellows.
- 63 have received a Nobel Prize.
- 42 have served as head of state or government.
- 1 (Boutros Boutros-Ghali) has served as secretary-general of the United Nations.

=== List of selected group of notable Fulbright grant recipients ===
- William D. "Bro" Adams, university administrator and NEH Chair (2014–2017)
- Ryan Adriandhy, film director and animator
- Edward Albee, recipient (three times) of the Pulitzer Prize for Drama
- Karim Alrawi, recipient of John Whiting Award for British and Commonwealth writers, twice recipient of Egyptian State Cultural Award, former president of Egyptian Pen
- Francis Andersen, Australian Hebrew and biblical studies scholar
- Claire Andrade-Watkins, academic, film director
- Paula Arai, Buddhist studies scholar
- John Ashbery, poet
- Gustavo V. Barbosa-Cánovas, Uruguayan American professor of Food Engineering; director of the Center for Nonthermal Processing of Food at Washington State University
- George Benneh, Ghanaian academic, university administrator and public servant
- Christopher Charles Benninger, recipient of the Indian Institute of Architects Gold Medal for contribution to architecture in (2004)
- Victor Bianchini, U.S. federal judge, California State superior court judge, retired colonel of U.S. Marine Corps; former law school dean
- Amy Biehl, anti-Apartheid activist murdered in South Africa
- Warren Binford, professor and children's rights scholar
- Harold Bloom, literary theorist and critic
- Josep Borrell, Spanish politician, High Representative of the Union for Foreign Affairs and Security Policy and Vice-President of the European Commission (2019-2024), President of the European Parliament (2004-2007), Spain's Minister of Foreign Affairs, European Union and Cooperation (2018-2019).
- Boutros Boutros-Ghali, Egyptian politician and secretary-general of the United Nations, 1992–1996
- Michael Broyde (born 1964), law professor
- Kofi Abrefa Busia, Ghanaian academic and Prime Minister of Ghana (1969–1972)
- Fernando Henrique Cardoso, president of Brazil, 1995–2002
- Kyle Carey, Celtic American musician
- Bob Carr, Australian politician
- Ron Castan, Australian constitutional law barrister
- Lenora Champagne, playwright, performance artist and director
- Dante R. Chialvo, scientist
- Dale Chihuly, glass sculptor and entrepreneur
- Mark Choate, historian, soldier, and diplomat
- Eugenie Clark, ichthyologist and founder of Mote Marine Laboratory
- George C. Clerk, Ghanaian botanist and plant pathologist pioneer
- Nathan Collett, filmmaker
- Aaron Copland, recipient of the Pulitzer Prize for Music
- Leah Curtis, Australian composer
- Eugenia Del Pino, Ecuadorian developmental biologist
- Myanna Dellinger, Danish-American law professor
- Arthur Deshaies, artist, printmaker, professor and head of the graphic workshop, Florida State University
- Rita Dove, U.S. Poet Laureate and recipient of the Pulitzer Prize for Poetry
- Ibrahim M. El-Sherbiny, Egyptian materials scientist
- Alfredo E. Evangelista, Filipino archaeologist and director of the Anthropology division of the National Museum of the Philippines
- Glynnis Fawkes, archaeological illustrator and graphic novelist
- Eric Foner, recipient of the Pulitzer Prize for History
- John Hope Franklin, historian and Presidential Medal of Freedom recipient
- Maryellen Fullerton, lawyer and law professor and interim dean at Brooklyn Law School
- Radhika Gajjala, communications and a cultural studies professor
- Philip A. Gale, British chemist and university administrator
- Vicente Blanco Gaspar, ambassador of Spain
- Ashraf Ghani, president of Afghanistan
- Gabby Giffords, United States representative for Arizona's 8th congressional district
- Jose B. Gonzalez, Poet Laureate of Connecticut, 2026-Present
- Walter Gonzalez Gonzalez (1924–1979), first Fulbright scholar to the United States from Bolivia, president of the Society of Bolivian Engineers ("Sociedad de Ingenieros de Bolivia")
- Robert A. Gorman (born 1937), law professor at the University of Pennsylvania Law School
- Wendy Greengross (1925–2012), general practitioner and broadcaster
- Amanda Harberg, composer on the faculty at the Berklee College of Music
- Nigel Healey, vice chancellor, Fiji National University
- Joel Heinen, professor, author and environmentalist Florida International University, Miami.
- Edward Herrmann, actor
- Robert Hess (1938–1994), president of Brooklyn College
- John Honnold (1915–2011), law professor at the University of Pennsylvania Law School
- Ross Horning, historian
- Brad K. Hounkpati, founder of Grain de Sel Togo, Inc
- Elizabeth Ellis Hoyt (1893–1980), economist, considered the inventor of the modern day Consumer Price Index
- Julia Ioffe (born 1982), Russian-born American journalist
- Michael Janis, glass sculptor and educator
- Rahul M. Jindal, Indian-American transplant surgeon at Uniformed Services University
- Roberta Karmel (born 1937), Centennial Professor of Law at Brooklyn Law School, and first female commissioner of the U.S. Securities and Exchange Commission
- Charles Kennedy, British politician
- Suzanne Klotz, painter and sculptor
- Koh Tsu Koon, Malaysian politician
- Cy Kuckenbaker, filmmaker
- Carrie Lam, Chief Executive of Hong Kong 2017–2022
- Karen LaMonte, sculptor
- Jeffrey W. Legro, political scientist and professor
- Ben Lerner, writer
- Bernadette Lim, physician and community organizer
- John Lithgow, actor
- Dolph Lundgren, actor
- Jamil Mahuad, president of Ecuador 1998–2000
- Viviana Mazza, writer, journalist
- John Atta Mills, legal scholar and president of Ghana (2009–2012)
- Baidyanath Misra, former vice-chancellor of the Odisha University of Agriculture and Technology
- Anna Moffo, soprano
- Daniel Patrick Moynihan, United States Senator and diplomat
- Robert Nozick, political philosopher
- Joan Oates, archaeologist
- Lisa Orr, potter and teacher of ceramics
- Mikael Owunna, photographer
- Linus Pauling, awarded the Nobel Prize in Chemistry and the Nobel Peace Prize
- Hugh V. Perkins, professor (UMCP), author, and education developer in Pakistan, 1958-1959
- Sylvia Plath, poet, recipient of the Pulitzer Prize for Poetry in 1982
- Niharica Raizada, actress
- Ian Rankin, author
- Alec Rasizade, historian, author of Rasizade's algorithm
- Anand Reddi, global health research, public health advocate and biotech executive
- Maria Ressa, awarded the Nobel Peace Prize
- Alexis Ringwald, former CEO of LearnUp, a Manpower Group company
- Berenice Robinson, author and composer
- Theodore Roethke, poet, recipient of the Pulitzer Prize for Poetry in 1954 and the National Book Award for Poetry in 1959 and 1965
- Margaret Vardell Sandresky, composer, organist and theorist
- Juan Manuel Santos, former president of Colombia from 2010 and 2018; recipient of the Nobel Peace Prize in 2016
- Philip Schultz, poet
- Benjamin Schwarz, editor and writer
- E. Anne Schwerdtfeger, composer and choral conductor
- Heather J. Sharkey, historian of the Middle East and Africa at the University of Pennsylvania
- Wallace Shawn, actor and playwright
- Mahi R. Singh, physics professor at University of Western Ontario
- Jane Smiley, recipient of the Pulitzer Prize for Fiction
- Javier Solana, Foreign Affairs Minister (1992–1995), Secretary General of NATO (1995–1999), European Union's High Representative for Common Foreign and Security Policy, Secretary General of the Council of the European Union and Secretary-General of the Western European Union (held these post between October 1999 and December 2009).
- Williametta Spencer, composer
- Henry Steiner, Austrian graphic designer
- Tracey Vivien Steinrucken, Australian ecologist, molecular biologist
- Joseph Stiglitz, recipient of the Nobel Prize in Economics
- Herbert Storing, Robert Kent Gooch Professor of Government and Foreign Affairs at the University of Virginia
- Robert S. Summers, law professor at Cornell Law School
- Rishi Sunak, prime minister of the United Kingdom
- Merze Tate, first black woman to attend the University of Oxford, first black woman to earn a Ph.D. in government and international relations from Harvard University
- Sergio Troncoso, author of From This Wicked Patch of Dust, Crossing Borders: Personal Essays, and The Nature of Truth
- Sasha Velour, queen, artist, and winner of season nine of RuPaul's Drag Race
- Eudora Welty, recipient of the Pulitzer Prize for Fiction
- Justin Wolfers, economist
- C. Vann Woodward, recipient of the Pulitzer Prize for History
- Charles Wright, poet
- James Wright, poet
- Muhammad Yunus, awarded the Nobel Peace Prize
- Sebastián Piñera, president of Chile
- Siphokazi Magadla, South African political scientist, professor at Rhodes University and author of Guerrillas and Combative Mothers: Women and the Armed Struggle in South Africa

== See also ==
- Academic mobility
- Belgian American Educational Foundation (BAEF)
- Chevening Scholarship
- Chiang Ching-kuo Foundation
- Cultural diplomacy
- EducationUSA
- Erasmus Programme
- Gates Cambridge Scholarship
- German Academic Exchange Service (Deutscher Akademischer Austauschdienst)
- Harkness Fellowship
- ITT International Fellowship Program
- Jardine Scholarship
- Jürgen Mulert
- Marshall Scholarship
- Monbukagakusho Scholarship
- National Security Language Initiative
- The Olmsted Scholar Program
- Rhodes Scholarship
- Yenching Scholarship
