= Mikael Owunna =

African-American photographer

- Born: Mikael Chukwuma Owunna; 1990 or 1991 (age 35–36); Pittsburgh, Pennsylvania, United States
- Education: Duke University, Oxford University
- Occupation: Photographer
- Notable work: Limitless Africans
- Awards: YWCA Racial Justice Award for Creativity and Innovation

Mikael Chukwuma Owunna is an American photographer who lives and works in Pittsburgh, Pennsylvania.

== Life ==
Owunna was born in Pittsburgh, Pennsylvania, and is of Nigerian and Swedish heritage. As a youth he attended boarding school in Ohio, where he was bullied after coming out. In college he studied engineering, earning a degree in Biomedical Engineering and History from Duke University. In 2009 he received a Rothermere Scholarship to Oxford University, and in 2012 he was named a Fulbright Scholar. He spent his Fulbright year in Taiwan.

Owunna is queer. While struggling to come to terms with his sexuality, he discovered photography, which became both a creative outlet and an escape. He has mentioned Octavia Butler and Chinua Achebe as influences on his work. He cites an exhibit of the work of Zanele Muholi as "the first time I had ever seen an image of another queer African person," and as part of the impetus for his first project, Limitless Africans.

== Work ==
Of his work, Owunna says: "I am constantly thinking about how I can imagine and reimagine universes where people from marginalized backgrounds—particularly Black and LGBTQ people—can be full and complete individuals."

In 2013 Owunna began work on Limitless Africans. The book took six and a half years to create, during which Owunna traveled to ten countries across North America, Europe and the Caribbean to document the experiences of LGBTQ African immigrants and refugees. "Growing up, I was told that it was 'un-African' to be gay and that homosexuality was foreign to our culture. After enduring years of severe alienation from my Nigerian heritage and a series of exorcisms in Nigeria, I started Limitless to reclaim my African-ness and queerness on my own terms." The New York Times described the book as "defiant and arresting, challenging notions of what queer people look like, what African people look like and the grace that comes from loving oneself."

His project Infinite Essence grew out of frustration with the constant media images of Black bodies as sites of violence and death. "What is the impact that has when you see somebody who looks like you being killed all of the time?" The project's goal is "to counteract the pain of those photos, to create imagery that show[s] the black body not as a site of death but as a site of magic." In February 2019 he received a $20,000 grant from the Greater Pittsburgh Arts Council to complete the project.
