= Jessie Gruman =

Jessie Gruman (December 7, 1953 – July 14, 2014) was a social psychologist active in the movement to incorporate evidence into health care and to help consumers adopt healthier behaviors. Gruman was the founder and president of the Washington, DC–based Center for Advancing Health from 1992 to 2014. She was the author of the book AfterShock: What to Do When the Doctor Gives You—or Someone You Love—a Devastating Diagnosis (Walker, 2007, second edition 2010). She lived in New York City.

At 20 she was diagnosed with Hodgkin's lymphoma. As was customary at the time, she was treated with heavy doses of radiation, which is now known to often lead to a succession of cancers later in life. At 30 she developed cervical cancer, and at 50 she developed colon cancer. At 57 she was diagnosed with stomach cancer, which she announced on the Center for Advancing Health's blog. At 59 she was diagnosed with metastatic lung cancer.

As president of the Center for Advancing Health Gruman drew on her own experience of treatment for five cancer diagnoses, interviews with patients and caregivers, surveys and peer-reviewed research to describe and advocate for policies and practices to overcome the challenges people face in finding good care and getting the most from it.

== Early life and first cancer ==
Gruman was born in Berea, Kentucky in 1953, and graduated from Vassar College in 1975 with an AB in English. She received a PhD in social psychology from Columbia University in 1984. Her interest in psychology was sparked by her experience when she had been treated for cancer at the University of Wisconsin Medical Center at the age of 20. Despite her life-threatening condition, she struggled to comply with treatments that would increase her chance of her recovery. This casual, irrational misbehavior in the face of extreme risk drove her interest in the complicated forces that influence how people act with regard to their health and health care.

== Career ==
From 1979 to 1984, Gruman worked at the Greenwich House Counseling Center with substance abusers and their families. She implemented the employee health promotion program, Total Life Concept (TLC) at the national headquarters of AT&T, Communications between 1984 and 1986. Gruman then managed the American Cancer Society's public education efforts directed toward adults from 1986 through 1988. She set up the nation's largest tobacco control demonstration project, ASSIST (the American Stop Smoking Intervention Study) at the National Cancer Institute, part of the National Institutes of Health.

In 1992, the John D. and Catherine T. MacArthur Foundation and the Nathan Cummings Foundation recruited Gruman to lead a new Washington DC–based policy institute, the Center for the Advancement of Health (renamed the Center for Advancing Health in 2009), to recognize the influence of behavioral, social, economic and environmental factors on health and disease. The center's core work includes the Health Behavior News Service, which covers the latest peer-reviewed studies and systematic reviews on the effects of behavior on health, health disparities and patient engagement research. Gruman wrote, spoke and was interviewed frequently about how people use scientific evidence when making decisions about their health and health care and what it means to be a health care consumer. She contributed regularly to the center's Prepared Patient Blog and frequently commented on current health news via Twitter.

== Research and policy conclusions ==
Gruman used her personal and academic background to understand how people respond to serious illness. She interviewed 200 patients and families about how they used scientific information after devastating medical diagnoses. In a keynote address, she said, "I fear that the trend toward consumer-driven health care will disproportionately damage the health of the less educated and less wealthy, and that the net effect on the nation's health has already proved negative." She concluded that most patients are unable to make critical decisions about their health care in the consumer-driven model. Some people, called "monitors," track down detailed information, while other people, called "blunters," don't want information. One blunter, a theoretical physicist, said he would be "insulted" if someone read 15 papers on theoretical physics and asked him to help design an experiment; he pays his doctor to explain his choices. A "monitor," a lawyer, applied her legal research skills but couldn't think clearly enough to decide. People turn to the Internet, become overwhelmed, or don't understand the significance of the information. "Most health information is bad news," is stressful, and makes decisions even more difficult.

== Board of Directors and Membership ==
Gruman served on many boards and advisory panels, including the Advisory Panel on Medicare Education (Centers for Medicaid and Medicare Services), the American Psychosocial Oncology Society, the Annals of Family Medicine, the Center for Information Therapy, the Center for Medical Technology Policy, the Claremont School of Community and Global Health, the Commission of Community-Engaged Scholarship in the Health Professions, the Health and Behavior Research Alliance, the Journal of Participatory Medicine, the Milbank Memorial Fund, the National Advisory Council for the Agency for Healthcare Research and Quality (US Department of Health and Human Services), the National Health Council, the National Organization of Tobacco Use Research Funders, the Public Health Institute, the Sallan Foundation, the United States Cochrane Center and VillageCare.

Gruman was a member of the American Academy of Arts and Sciences and the Council on Foreign Relations. She was a fellow of the New York Academy of Medicine and the Society for Behavioral Medicine.

Gruman received honorary doctorates from Brown University, Carnegie Mellon University, Clark University, Georgetown University, New York University, Northeastern University, Salve Regina University, Syracuse University and Tulane University, and the Presidential Medal of the George Washington University. She was also honored by Research!America, the National Coalition for Cancer Survivorship, and the Society for Behavioral Medicine, which in 2014 created the Jessie Gruman Award for Health Engagement to recognize annually an individual who has made a pivotal contribution to research, practice or policy in the field of health engagement.

== Death ==
Gruman died at home in New York on July 14, 2014.

== Bibliography ==
- Gruman, J. Preparing Patients to Care for Themselves. American Journal of Nursing. 2014;July;114(7)11.
- Gruman, J. An Accidental Tourist Finds Her Way in the Dangerous Land of Serious Illness. Health Affairs. 2013;February;32(2);427–431.
- Gruman, J. Slow Leaks: Missed Opportunities to Encourage Our Engagement in Our Health Care. Washington, DC: Health Behavior Media, 2013.
- Gruman, J. A Year of Living Sickishly: A Patient Reflects. Washington, DC: Health Behavior Media, 2013.
- Gruman, J. Making Health Information Technology Sing for People with Chronic Conditions. American Journal of Preventive Medicine. 2011;40(5 Suppl 2);S238–240(2011–05).
- Gruman, J. AfterShock: What to Do When the Doctor Gives You – or Someone You Love – A Devastating Diagnosis. New York: Walker and Company, 2010 (second edition).
- Gruman J, Holmes Rovner M, French ME, Jeffress D, Sofaer S, Shaller D, Prager DJ. From Patient Education to Patient Engagement: Implications for the Field of Patient Education. Patient Education and Counseling. 2010;March;78(3);350–356.
- Gruman, J. The Experience of the American Patient: Risk, Choice, Trust. Washington, DC: Health Behavior Media, 2009.
- Gruman J. and Smith CW. Why the Journal of Participatory Medicine? Journal of Participatory Medicine. October 22, 2009.
- Gruman, J. Behavior Matters: 15 Years of Health Behavior Advocacy. Washington, DC: Health Behavior Media, 2008.
- Holmes-Rovner M, Gruman J, Rovner DR. Shared Decision Making in the US: Research and Development Outpaces Delivery. Journal for Evidence and Quality in Health Care. 2007;101:254–258.
- Gruman, J. Science and the Bush Administration. Science. 2005; Jan 28;5709:529.
- Gruman, J. How Foundations Hurt Charities. Chronicle of Philanthropy. 2004; August 19.
- Sofaer, S. and Gruman J. Consumers of Health Information and Health Care: Challenging Assumptions and Defining an Alternative. American Journal of Health Promotion. 2003; Nov–Dec; 18(2:151–6.)
- Gruman, J. Basic vs. Applied Research: Finding a Balance. Chronicle of Higher Education. March 28, 2003.
- Gruman J and Prager DJ. Health Research in a Time of Plenty: A Strategic Agenda. Health Affairs. 2002;21(5):265–269.
- Sloan RP, Gruman J, Allegrante JP. Investing in Employee Health: San Francisco. Jossey-Bass Publishers, 1987.
