= Grain de Sel Togo =

Grain de Sel Togo, Inc.
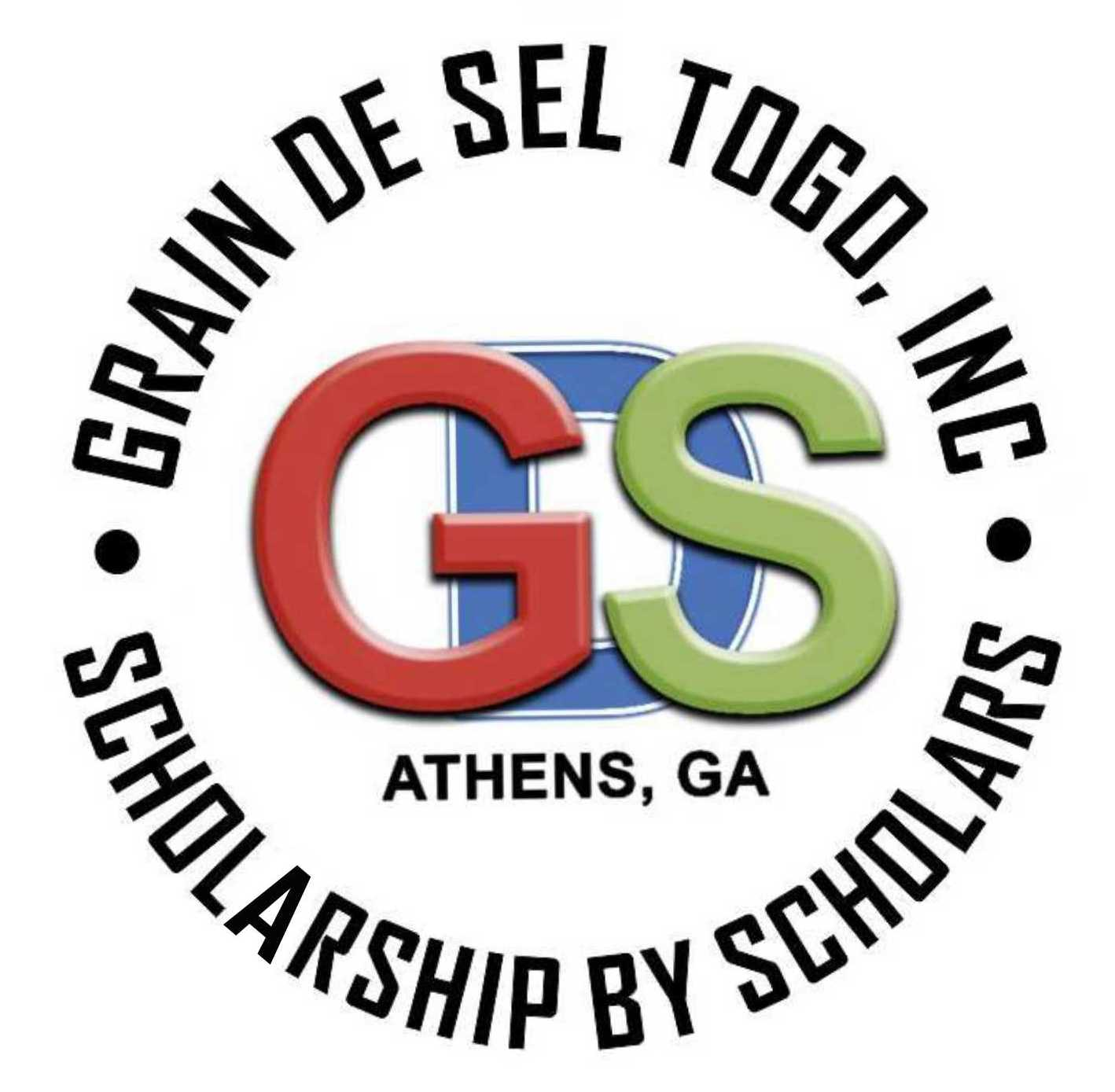
- Logo - Grain de Sel Togo
- Abbreviation: GDSTOGO
- Formation: July 27, 2013; 13 years ago
- Founder: Dr. Brad Hounkpati
- Founded at: Athens, GA
- Type: 501c(3) Organization
- Tax ID no.: 46-4327960
- Purpose: Helping needy students in public universities in Sub Saharan Africa
- Headquarters: PO Box 243, Athens, GA 30603
- Location: Togo, West Africa, France, Georgia, USA
- Services: Scholarship Program
- Chairman & President: Dr. Brad Hounkpati
- CEO: George M Smith
- IT Assistant: Abraham Samah
- Secretary: Fridausse Madougou
- Parent organization: BsbizTogo
- Affiliations: University of Georgia
- Volunteers: ~18

Grain de Sel Togo, Inc. is a 501(c)(3) non-profit organization initiated on July 27, 2013 in Athens, Georgia, by Kwevitoukoui Hounkpati, also known as Dr. Brad Hounkpati, a Togolese Fulbright Scholar, and four others.

Registered under Georgia (USA) Law, Grain de Sel Togo is dedicated to helping ambitious and talented but underprivileged students in public universities of Togo and sub Saharan Africa through scholarships and coaching. Each year, GDS selects new grantees and organizes career development workshop in partnership with Public Affairs Section of the Lomé U.S. Embassy. GDS also serves as contact for all new Fulbright Grantees and other U.S Department of State Exchange Program Visitors from Togo and West Africa, and sometimes to International Students from Africa.

As of January 2025, GDS has offered scholarships to 55 students in public universities in Kara and Lomé, Togo, Bordeaux, France, Dunkerque, France and in Ouagadougou, Burkina Faso. Other students have been supported for the Master and doctoral Studies in Canada, France and in the US. Grain de Sel Togo provides technical and academic support to Fulbright scholars from Africa.

== History ==
Inspired by the Fulbright Program, founded in 1946 by the US Senator from Arkansas J. William Fulbright, who promulgated the Exchange Fulbright, considered to be one of the most prestigious scholarships programs in the world.

In recognition of the efforts of the US State Department to ensure the quality and excellence of the Fulbright scholarship and affiliate programs.

Based on this prestigious model;

Convinced that supporting needy but also outstanding and motivated students in public universities will ensure the continuity of the culture of academic excellence and lead to a new form of leadership;

Believing that Africans themselves can also contribute to the promotion of education in Sub-Saharan countries, setting themselves as leadership role models;

Following a proposal from Dr. Brad Hounkpati, a group of Fulbright Fellows from Togo who received assistance from the promoter, while studying in US universities, decided to create – on this day of 27 July 2013 – a scholarship called Grain De Sel / Grain of Salt (GDS) to support needy students.

The Incorporator and Founder of Grain de Sel Togo, Inc. Dr. Brad Hounkpati, had served as Board Member, Member Database Administrator, Advocacy Director, Communication Officer, WebMaster, and Vice President with the Georgia Chapter of the Fulbright Association, a community of over 1,200 thousands scholars from over 110 countries.

== Administration ==
=== Headquarters ===
Grain de Sel Togo is a 501c3 organization based in Athens, Georgia, USA. It is managed by a board of directors under the leadership of its founder. The organization is also registered at the University of Georgia as a Student Organization with the Center for Student Organizations. The Fulbright Association has featured Grain de Sel Togo as one of its alumni successful stories. This is the first time African Fulbright Scholars initiative has been featured, making Grain de Sel Togo a pioneer of leadership and scholarship program in Togo and in Africa. The story described the organization has been created along with activities since 2013.

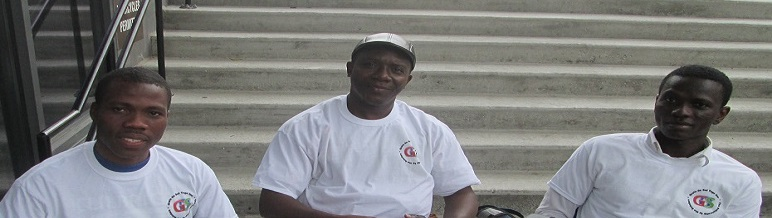
GDS 1st Anniversary in Philadelphia, PA. with 3 founding members

=== National Representations ===
==== Togo National Representation Office ====
Currently, Togo national administration serves as Regional office for Africa. GDS Togo office is located in Adidogme, Lomé. At the University of Lomé, an Academic Advisor serves as Assistant to the National Representative. Partnership has been established with the University of Kara and the University of Lomé, with the support of Public Affairs Section of U.S. Lomé Embassy and American Corner.

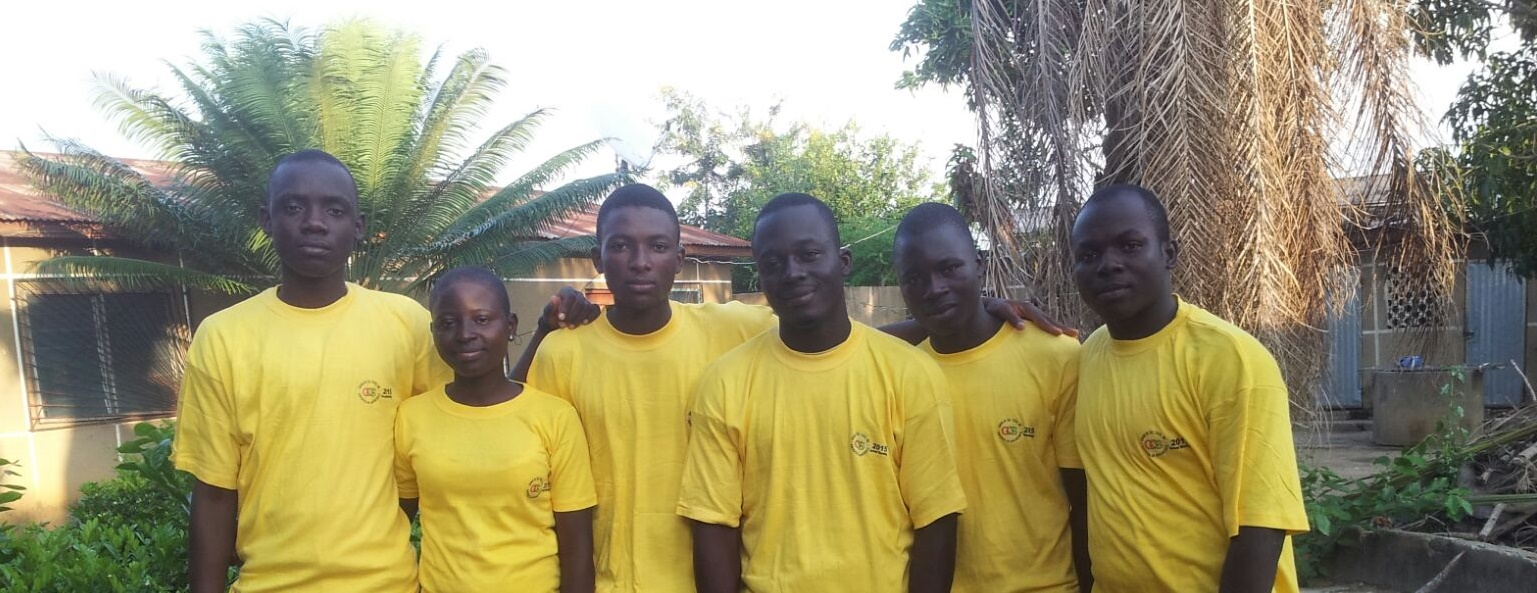
Grantees of Grain de Sel Togo and staff celebrating Anniversary II in Kara, Togo

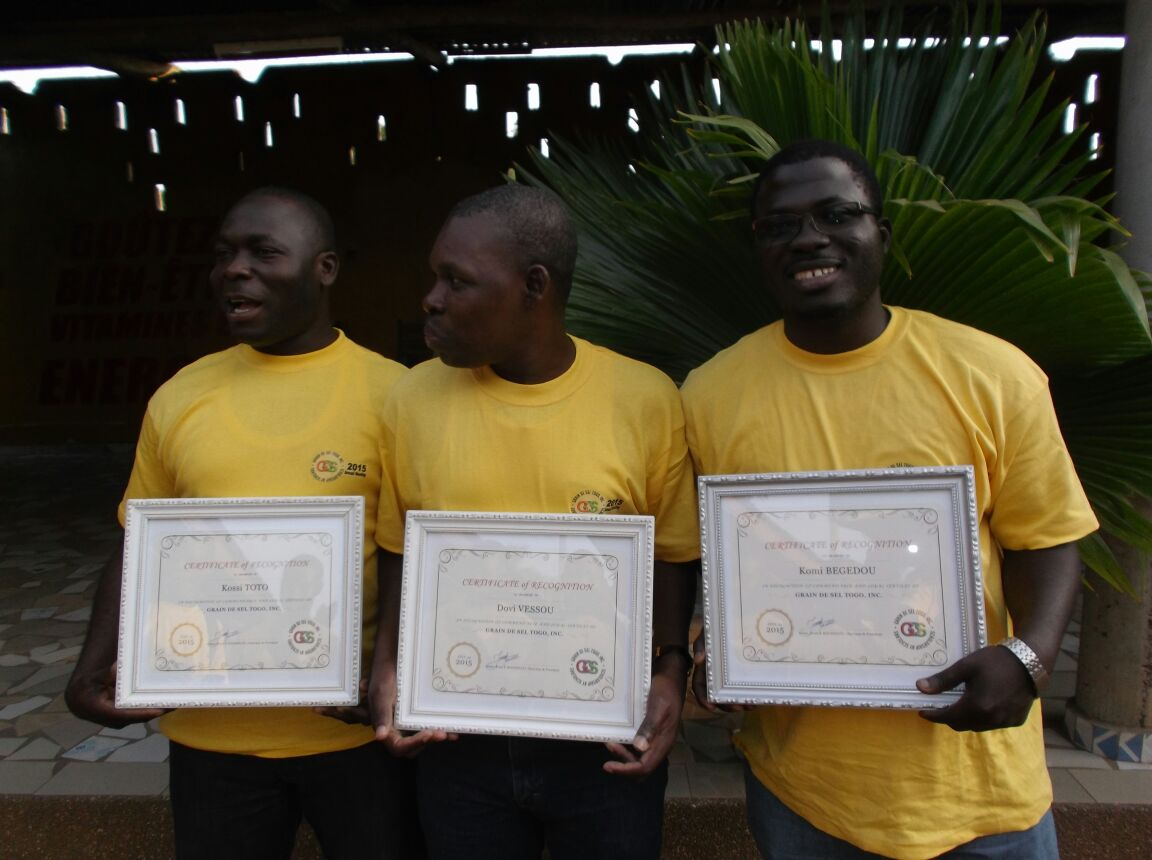
Staff of Grain de Sel Togo celebrating Anniversary II in Lomé, Togo

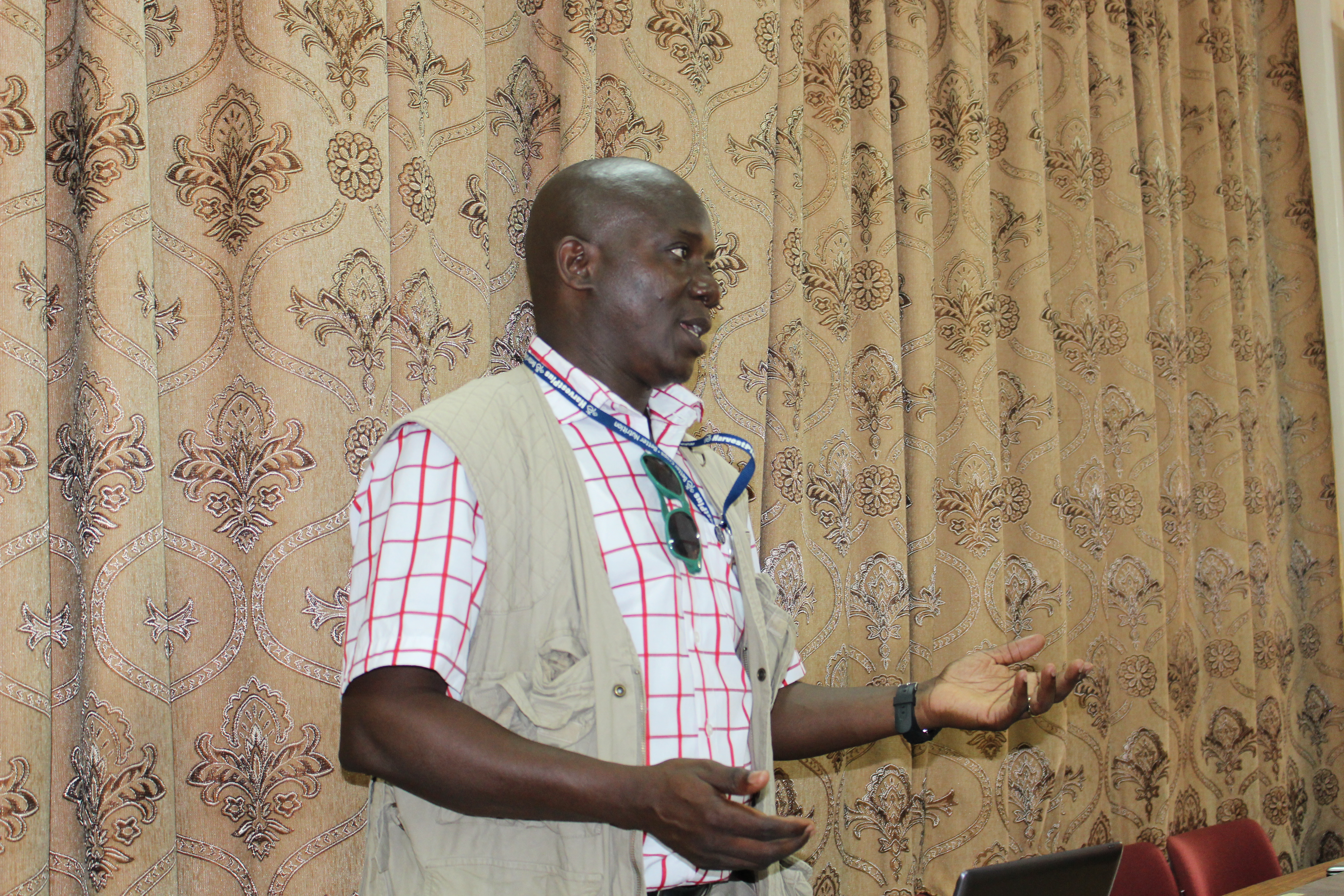
2015 career development workshop in Lomé, Togo

==== France National Representation ====
GDS has been incorporated in France as in order to coordinate the organizational efforts in France and in Europe. GDS representative office, previously located in La Tour du Pin. was moved to Ezanville, France.

=== Program ===
Besides scholarships, Grain de Sel Togo organizes each year a career development workshop for the students of the Universities of Kara and Lomé, Togo (West Africa). The latest was on May 22, 2015 at the American Corner, University of Lomé, Togo.

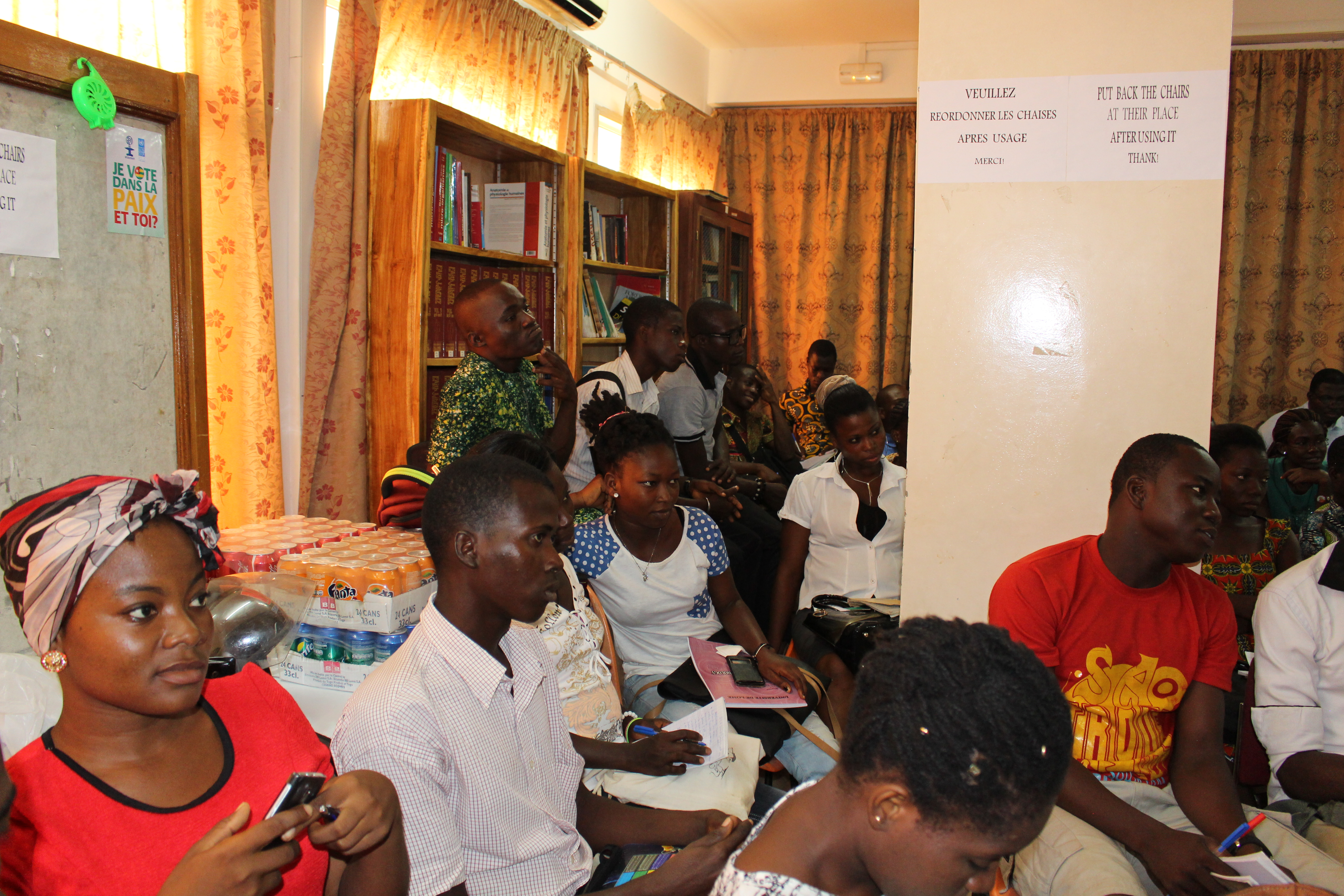
2015 GDS workshop in Togo: participants

Since February 2014, a subsidized computers and other electronics program has been established in partnership with BsbizTogo. Through this program, Grain de Sel Togo has been able to provide quality computers and other electronic devices to underprivileged students and their peers in West Africa.
