= Donald Richards (statistician) =

Jamaican statistician

Donald St. P. Richards
- Born: Mandeville, Jamaica
- Education: University of the West Indies
- Awards: Fellow of the Institute of Mathematical Statistics, 1999; Fellow of the American Mathematical Society, 2013
- Scientific career
- Fields: Statistics, Probability
- Workplaces: Pennsylvania State University; University of Virginia; University of North Carolina at Chapel Hill; University of the West Indies

Donald St. P. Richards (born 1955, in Mandeville, Jamaica) is an American statistician conducting research on multivariate statistics, zonal polynomials, distance correlation, total positivity, and hypergeometric functions of matrix argument. He is a distinguished professor emeritus of statistics at the Pennsylvania State University, and is a Fellow of the Institute of Mathematical Statistics and a Fellow of the American Mathematical Society.

Richards obtained his PhD in 1978 at the University of the West Indies, where the statistician Rameshwar D. Gupta was his doctoral advisor. In 1999, he was elected a Fellow of the Institute of Mathematical Statistics. In 2012, he was elected a Fellow of the American Mathematical Society.

== Personal life ==
Richards became an American citizen in 1990. He was married to Mercedes Richards, an American Jamaican-born professor of astronomy and astrophysics, until her death in 2016.
