= Ibrahim M. El-Sherbiny =

Egyptian Professor of Nanomaterials & Nanomedicine

- إبراهيم الشربيني
- Education: Mansoura University (BS 1998, MS 2002); Massey University (PhD 2007)
- Scientific career
- Fields: Materials science, pharmacology, toxicology, pharmaceutical chemistry, biochemistry, nanomaterials, medicine, nanomedicine, environmental science, drug delivery, tissue engineering, regenerative medicine, biosensing
- Institutions: University of New Mexico, Michigan University, Texas University Zewail City of Science, Technology and Innovation
- Website: Zewail City page

Ibrahim M. El-Sherbiny (Arabic: إبراهيم الشربيني) is an Egyptian Professor of Nanomaterials and Nanomedicine at the University of Science and Technology Zewail City, Egypt. He is the Director of Nanoscience Program and the Center for Materials Science of the institution. He is a member Biomedical Engineering Society and a Fellow of Royal Society of Chemistry.

== Education ==
Ibrahim M. El-Sherbiny obtained his BSc in chemistry and his master's degree in polymers from Mansoura University. He moved to Massey University, New Zealand and obtain his PhD in smart drug delivery in 2007.

== Career ==
El-Sherbiny was a post-doctoral fellow in three different universities; Michigan University, University of New Mexico and Texas University, United States between 2008 and 2010. From 2010 to 2011, he became a Research Assistant Professor at the latter University. He is currently the Professor of Nanomaterials Science and Director of the Center for Materials Science at Zewail City of Science and Technology, Egypt.

== Awards and scholarships ==
In 2009, he was awarded a Fulbright Fellowship from the University of Michigan and in 2011, his name got featured on Who's Who in the World (28th Edition). In 2012, he received Prestigious STATE Incentive Award in Science given by the National Academy of Scientific Research, Egypt. In 2013, he was awarded the Venice Goda Award for Scientific Creativity for Young Researchers in the field of Materials Science and its Applications also by National Academy of Scientific Research, Egypt. In June 2024, El-Sherbiny was awarded a Doctor of Science (D.Sc.) degree by Mansoura University.

== Memberships ==
He became a member of the Egyptian Society for Polymer Science & Technology (ESPST) in 2007, American Association of Pharmaceutical Scientists (AAPS) in 2008, Biomedical Engineering Society (BMES), USA in 2009 and Egyptian Chemical Society in 2011. In 2012, he co founded the Egyptian Organization for Scientific Research and Technology. He became a member of Egyptian-American Scientists Association (EASA)- Medical Committee, a member of American Royal Society, Science Age Society (SAS) and Materials Research Society in 2010, 2012 and 2013 respectively.
