= Climate Solutions Road Tour =

Project of the Indian Youth Climate Network

Climate Solutions Road Tour, held between January 2 and February 4, 2009, was a project initiated by the Indian Youth Climate Network which started off at Chennai, India. Alexis Ringwald and Caroline Howe (both from Yale University) had orchestrated the tour. Ten members of the Indian Youth Climate Network, a group of dancers from the Shiamak Davar dance group, and a solar-powered band "Solar Punch" covered more than 3,500 kilometers.

The objective of the tour had been defined as:

"helping young people through this project by taking their ideas and implementing them for solutions to climate change. It's now time for action; to create, communicate and celebrate new ideas."

The road tour which began in Chennai on January 2, 2009 covered 15 major cities including Bangalore, Hyderabad, Pune, Mumbai, Ahmedabad, Jaipur, Delhi, Udaipur, Delhi, Dungarpur, Tilonia, and Goa. The tour successfully ended on 5 February at Delhi.
