= Mahi R. Singh =

Physics professor

- Born: India
- Education: T.D. College (B.Sc.); Banaras Hindu University (MSc, PhD)
- Awards: NIST Visiting Researcher (2022); Fulbright US-Canada Research Chair (2020-2021); Alexander von Humboldt Award (1979)
- Scientific career
- Fields: Nanoscience; Plasmonic; Metamaterial
- Workplaces
- Website: www.physics.uwo.ca/~msingh/

Mahi R. Singh (b. 1949) is a professor of physics at Western University researching nanoscience. He was awarded the Fulbright US-Canada Research Chair for 2021-2022.

== Early life ==
Singh was born in 1949 in Hamirpur, India. He received his B.Sc. degree in T.D. College campus; and both M.Sc. (1970) and PhD (1976) degrees from Banaras Hindu University in condensed matter physics.

== Academic career ==
Singh was awarded Humbold Fellow in Stuttgart University from 1979 to 1981. Between 1981 and 1985 he was a Research Associate and Lecturer at McGill University. From 1982 to 1983 he worked in High Magnetic Field Lab, Université Paul Sabatier as a visiting scientist. He also worked as Research Associate at University of North Carolina.

He joined the University of Western Ontario as associate professor in 1985. Currently he is professor in this university. He was also a visiting professor at Texas Center for Superconductivity from June till November in 1992. He also worked as a chief researcher at Superconductors Division of Hitachi, Tokyo between November 1992. During May and August in 2022, he became Fulbright US-Canada Research Chair in Vanderbilt University.

His visiting positions include Texas Center for Superconductivity (1992), University of Oxford (1993-1994), and Dubna and Ioffe Institute Saint Petersburg (2019).

== Research ==
Research topics include:

- Nanomaterials and Nanocomposites
- Nanophotonics, Plasmonics, and Polaritonics
- Graphene and Carbon Nanostructures
- Metallic Nanostructures
- Second Harmonic Generation
- Photonic
- Metamaterials
- Biomaterials

== Selected honors and awards ==
- NIST Visiting Researcher, NIST USA, 2022
- Fulbright US-Canada Research Chair, 2020-2021
- External Expert for Gerhard Herzberg Canada Gold Medal for Science and Engineering, 2020-2021
- Royal Society Visiting Scientist/Professor. 1993-1994
- Chief Researcher, Hitachi, Tokyo in 1992–1993
- Alexander von Humboldt Award, 1979
