= Fulbright Commission Iceland =

Iceland's Fulbright Program

The Fulbright Commission in Iceland is an inter-governmental organization that administers the Fulbright Program in Iceland by offering Fulbright grants to students and scholars. It is located in the center of Iceland's capital, Reykjavík. The Commission also administers nominations for the Frank Boas Scholarship for International Legal Studies at the Harvard Law School and the Cobb Family Fellowship for Icelandic citizens. The Commission also serves as the only Education USA advising center in Iceland, providing impartial advice on U.S. education opportunities.

== Program and grants ==
The Icelandic Fulbright Commission was founded in 1957, when a bi-national agreement between Iceland and the United States was signed on February 23, 1957. Grants are awarded to students of Icelandic and American descent for graduate and post-graduate studies, while scholar grants are awarded to Icelandic scholars to undertake research in the United States and for American scholars to teach and do research in Iceland. The Commission offers approximately 6-10 student grants annually to Icelandic citizens and another 1-2 grants for Icelandic scholars who plan to conduct research in the US. Approximately 5-6 grants are offered to US students and another 3 on average to US scholars each year.

In addition, the Icelandic Fulbright Commission administers two other grants offered to Icelandic citizens. The Frank Boas scholarship for L.L.M Law study at Harvard University, is competed for annually by 9 European countries, of which Iceland is one. The Cobb Family Fellowship is funded by a former US Ambassador to Iceland Charles E. Cobb. and his wife Sue M.Cobb. The grant is offered annually to one Icelandic graduate student in any field at the University of Miami.

Currently, the Iceland Fulbright Commission has supported over 1300 grantees, approximately 900 to Icelanders and 450 U.S. citizens.

The Arctic has become a major focus of the work of the Fulbright Commission in Iceland. In early 2014, the Commission concluded an agreement with the Ministry for Foreign Affairs (MFA). The agreement sets up a three year pilot project whereby the Ministry funds the Fulbright-MFA Arctic Scholar Grant. This grant brings one US scholar to Iceland per academic year for one semester to teach, as well as conduct research. The grant is open to scholars in a wide variety of Arctic fields.

In January 2015, the Commission signed an agreement with the US National Science Foundation (NSF) for a three-year pilot project to bring U.S. scholars and fellows to Iceland to conduct research in a wide variety of fields in the social and natural sciences, as they relate to the Arctic. NSF provides funding for Fulbright-NSF Arctic Research Grants and the Commission administers the grants program and provides infrastructure, services, and support to grantees. This is the first such partnership between the NSF and Fulbright. In addition to the Fulbright-NSF grants, we are participating in the Fulbright Arctic Initiative (FAI). The FAI brings together Fulbright scholars from all Arctic Council states to collaborate across disciplines on pressing issues facing the Arctic.

== Funding and Board ==
The Commission is funded by the U.S. and Icelandic governments. The Icelandic Minister of Education and the U.S. Ambassador to Iceland are the Honorary Chairmen of the Board. The Ministry of Education and the U.S. Embassy appoint the Commission's Board of Directors, four Icelanders and four Americans, in addition to one alternate each. The Board hires an Executive Director, who is responsible for the hiring of other staff and for the day-to-day running of the Commission

== Education USA Advising Center ==
The Commission hosts the only Education USA Advising Center in Iceland. The Advising Center is one of a network of over 450 centers around the world. Providing comprehensive and impartial advice on education opportunities in the U.S.

== Fulbright Alumni Association in Iceland ==
The Alumni Association was founded on March 25, 2008. The Association hosts various events, including an annual Thanksgiving dinner.

== Partnership Award ==
The Partnership Award was established in 1991 when Ambassador Charles E. Cobb, then the US Ambassador to Iceland, and Ambassador Sue M. Cobb presented the city of Reykjavík with the sculpture Partnership in commemoration of 50 years of diplomatic relations between Iceland and the United States. In 2003 the Fulbright Commission in Iceland was asked to administer the Cobb Partnership Award. The Partnership Award is awarded biannually. The Commission’s Board of Directors nominate an American who has been an outstanding advocate of American values in Iceland and has strengthened the ties between the two countries. As of 2013, fourteen recipients have been awarded the Cobb Partnership Award.

== Events and publications ==
The Commission is also responsible for coordinating, organizing and sponsoring various events throughout the year to highlight the Fulbright Program and the work of the Commission, promote higher education in the US and provide information to students on the US education system. The Commission also publishes an annual report and a semi-annual newsletter.
