= Alexis Ringwald =

Entrepreneur in education technology

Alexis Ringwald is a Fulbright Scholar and one of the founders of both the Valence Energy and LearnUp corporation. She was twice a member of Forbes 30 under 30 for having founded the two companies. She was 2010's Most Influential Women in Technology by Fast Company magazine.

== Education and early career ==
Ringwald graduated from the Yale School of Forestry and Environmental Science (F&ES) (which is presently the Yale School of the Environment) in 2006 with a dual BA and MEM (Masters in Environment Management) degree in environmental management. That same year, she began her research at the Tata Energy Research institute (presently The Energy and Resources Institute) in India as a Fulbright Research Fellow.

After graduating, her book Momentum for Renewable Energy in India (2008) was published. In 2009, she and Caroline Howe (also from Yale) orchestrated the Climate Solutions Road Tour. She later became the co-founder of Valence Energy, a company that produces energy management software and that was later sold to Serious Energy.

== LearnUp ==
She later was chairman and co-founder with Kenny Ma of LearnUp, a career management platform for entry-level workers. In 2015, the company was funded in a Series A transaction with venture capital firms Floodgate, Greylock Partners, High Line Ventures Partners, and Shasta Ventures. In the same year, the company was the by the World Economic Forum's 2015 Technology Pioneer. The company was later acquired by Manpower Group in 2017.

== Awards and accolades ==
- Forbes 30 under 30: 2012 and 2013
- Fast Company Magazine's Most Influential Women in Technology: 2010
