= Maldivian Youth Climate Network =

Non-governmental organization

- Abbreviation: MYCN
- Formation: 29 August 2010
- Founder: Mohamed Shinaz Saeed Aisha Niyaz
- Type: NGO
- Purpose: Youth representation
- Location: Maldives
- Main organ: Executive Committee
- Website: mycn.mv

The Maldivian Youth Climate Network (MYCN), founded on 29 August 2010, is a non-governmental organisation from Maldives which is primarily involved in raising awareness on and empowering youth to combat climate change. It is currently one of the leading organizations advocating against climate change in Maldives.

== Objectives ==
- Establishing a strong network among youth to build resilience to Climate Change
- Informing youth on Climate Change science and impacts
- Building capacity of youth to implement innovative solutions for adaptation and mitigation
- Support youth to ensure that funds are allocated to sound projects that address the needs of the most vulnerable communities
- Policy advocacy such as reviewing legislations, regulations, guidelines and policies to ensure evidence-based decision making

== Activities ==
=== 2010 ===
- Waste Management Partner at the Hay Festival; Aarah, Maldives. (14–17 October)
- Participated in South Asian Youth Summit on Climate Change; Colombo, Sri Lanka. (28–31 October)
- Partner at 5th Japan Maldives Festival; Male’, Maldives
- Participated in Unity Day Fair, Male’, Maldives. (26 December)

=== 2011 ===
- Conducted the Third SAARC Youth Camp; Addu, Maldives. (21–26 February)
- Participated in CHSE Environs Fair; Male', Maldives (22–23 March)
- Organised and conducted MYCN Fanaaru 2011 Climate Camp; K. Huraa, Maldives. (5–7 May)
- Participated in the World Environment Day 2011 official celebrations; Male', Maldives (5 June)
- Conducted a session at the Girl Guides' Camp; K. Villingili, Maldives (7 June)
- Conducted an awareness raising session on Climate Change at Muhibbuddin School; Addu, Maldives (17 August)
- Participated in UNFCCC COP 17; Durban, South Africa. (28–9 December)

=== 2012 ===
- Antarctic exploration trip
- Participated in UNFCCC COP 18; Doha, Qatar. (December)
