= Slovak Fulbright Commission =

The Slovak Fulbright Commission is a non-profit organization in Slovakia that provides scholarships, fellowships and counseling for Slovak students studying in the United States and American students in Slovakia.

The Fulbright Commission was created in 1994 by treaty between the two countries. It is based in Bratislava, Slovakia. Since its formation, over 180 American students and scholars have studied in Slovakia while over 220 Slovak students and scholars have studied in the United States.

== Scholarship and Fellowship Opportunities in the Slovak Republic ==
The Slovak Fulbright Commission offers many opportunities for study, research and English Teaching for U.S. students in Slovakia.

=== Fulbright U.S. Student Program ===
The Fulbright U.S. Student Program offers fellowships for U.S. graduating college seniors, graduate students, young professionals, and artists to study abroad for one academic year. As of the 2012-2013 academic year, only two grants per year were available under this program. Applicants must have knowledge of the Slovak language commensurate with their proposed project, a letter of affiliation from a Slovak host institution, and a completed application including three letters of recommendation.

=== Fulbright English Teaching Assistantship Program (ETA) ===
The Fulbright ETA Program places U.S. students as English teaching assistants in schools or universities overseas. ETAs may also pursue individual study/research plans in addition to their teaching responsibilities. For the 2012-2013 application cycle, 19 applications were received for eight ETA positions.

=== Fulbright U.S. Scholar Program ===
The Fulbright U.S. Scholar Program sends American scholars and professionals abroad to lecture and/or conduct research in a wide variety of academic and professional fields.

== Opportunities for Slovak Citizens in the U.S. ==
For students, the Fulbright Foreign Student Program enables graduate students, young professionals, and artists from abroad to research and study in the United States for one year or longer. For scholars, available programs include the Fulbright Visiting Scholar Program, the Fulbright Scholar-in-Residence Program (SIR) and the Fulbright European Union Scholar-in-Residence (EUSIR) Program.

== EducationUSA Advising Center ==
The Slovak Fulbright Commission also hosts an Education USA Advising Center in Bratislava. EducationUSA is a global network of more than 400 advising centers supported by the Bureau of Educational and Cultural Affairs at the U.S. Department of State. In Bratislava, the center provides individual admissions and test preparation consulting for students, including \library and computer access. The advising center also organizes presentations and seminars on study opportunities in the U.S. for Slovak high school and university students as well as representatives of Slovak academia.
