= Charles Irwin Lambert =

American physician

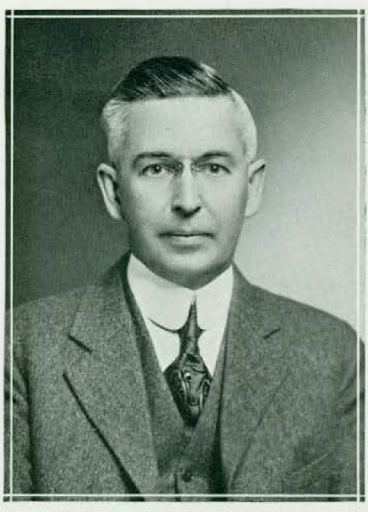
Portrait c. 1922

Charles Irwin Lambert (December 1877 – April 15, 1954) was an American physician and academic at Columbia University.

== Early life and education ==
Lambert was born at Argyle, Wisconsin, to Furniss and Mary Wesley Reynolds Lambert. He graduated from Iowa State Teachers College (now the University of Northern Iowa) in 1897. He earned a B.S. degree in 1901 from the State University of Iowa (now the University of Iowa) and went on to earn the M.D. and M.S. degrees in 1903. He was a member of Sigma Xi, the scientific research honor society. Following his medical studies, Lambert did postgraduate study in Munich and at Harvard before returning to Iowa in 1904 to teach as an instructor in pathology and bacteriology at the State University of Iowa College of Medicine.

== Career ==
He migrated to New York City in 1905 and became an associate in neuropathology at the New York Psychiatric Institute where he was the pathologist at the Manhattan State Hospital on Wards Island until 1913. In 1913, he became a psychopathologist and the assistant director of the Bloomingdale Hospital in White Plains, New York. He began his career at Columbia and the Presbyterian Hospital in 1922 when he accepted an appointment as chief psychiatrist and director of the Vanderbilt Clinic psychiatric department, serving in the role until 1929.

He remained an attending psychiatrist at the Vanderbilt Clinic from 1930 to 1939, was an assistant consulting psychiatrist at the New York-Presbyterian Hospital from 1924 to 1939, and served as an attending psychiatrist at the New York-Presbyterian Sloane Hospital for Women from 1929 to 1939. Lambert was an associate professor of psychiatry at the College of Physicians & Surgeons from 1923 to 1929 and professor of psychiatric education at Teachers College from 1926 to 1937, where he taught courses on mental hygiene and psychiatric disorders. Lambert advised the military draft service on psychiatric issues during both World Wars and was a consultant on the psychiatric condition of several notorious criminals. At the time of his death, he was semi-retired and served as the medical director of the Four Winds Hospital in Katonah, New York, a private psychiatric facility that he founded in 1925.

== Family ==
A son, John Pierce Lambert, a graduate of Princeton, was a 1935 graduate of the College of Physicians & Surgeons.
