= Jonathan Sherbino =

Canadian physician and author

- Occupations: Emergency, trauma physician, clinician educator, academic, and author
- Awards: 3M National Teaching Fellow, Society for Teaching and Learning in Higher Education (2021); Teacher of the Year award, Canadian Association of Emergency Physicians (2018)

Academic background
- Education: Bachelor of Science; Doctor of Medicine; Master of Education
- Alma mater: University of Guelph; University of Ottawa; University of Toronto
- Website: http://www.jsherbino.com/

Jonathan Sherbino is a Canadian emergency & trauma physician, clinician educator, academic, and author. He is a professor in the Department of Medicine and serves as an assistant dean for Health Professions Education Research at McMaster University. He is an affiliate researcher at Karolinska Institutet. He co-hosts The Papers podcast (and previously the Key Literature in Medical Education – KeyLIME – podcast).

Sherbino is most known for his work on clinical reasoning and competency-based medical education. Among his authored works are publications in academic journals, as well as books such as Educational Design: A CanMEDS Guide for the Health Professions and The CanMEDS 2015 Physician Competency Framework. He is the recipient of the 2018 Teacher of the Year award by the Canadian Association of Emergency Physicians. In 2021 he was honored as a 3M National Teaching Fellow by the Society for Teaching and Learning in Higher Education.

Sherbino is a Fellow of the Royal College of Physicians & Surgeons (Canada) and the Academy of Medical Educators in the United Kingdom.

== Education ==
Sherbino earned a Bachelor of Science in Biological Sciences from the University of Guelph in 1996, followed by a Doctor of Medicine degree from the University of Ottawa in 2001. He completed specialty training in emergency medicine at the University of Toronto in 2006. He also achieved a graduate degree in higher education from the University of Toronto in 2005

== Career ==
Sherbino began his academic career at McMaster University in 2007. He had a concurrent appointment with the Royal College of Physicians and Surgeons of Canada as a senior Clinician Educator from 2006 to 2015. He has been affiliated with the Karolinska Institutet as a researcher since 2023.

Sherbino is the Assistant Dean of Health Professions Education Research at McMaster University, since 2017. He was the chair of Emergency Medicine, Royal College of Physicians and Surgeons of Canada from 2015 to 2020. He is the co-founder of the Area of Focused Competence – Clinician Educator (Royal College).

Since 2009, he has worked as an emergency physician at St. Joseph's Healthcare Hamilton.

== Research ==
Sherbino's research in medical education has focused on competency-based medical education (CBME), clinical reasoning, and assessment methods. His work in CBME has advocated for shifting medical training from time-based to competency-focused, while refining the CanMEDS framework that describes the abilities of physician practice.

Sherbino has also delved into clinical reasoning, exploring how medical professionals make decisions, emphasizing the role of experience (and knowledge) in diagnostic accuracy and pushing against the call for cognitive debiasing curricula. More recently, he has studied the role of artificial intelligence to improve clinical reasoning.

In assessment, Sherbino's research has emphasized the role of programmatic assessment, including work-based assessment.
