= Power Shift (conference) =

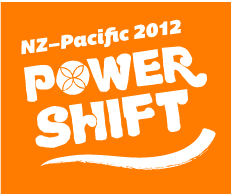
- Logo for the New Zealand-Pacific 2012 Event
- Date: November 2–5, 2007 (US); February 27 – March 2, 2009(US); July 11–13, 2009(AUS); October 9–12, 2009 (UK); October 23–26, 2009 (CA); December 7th-9th, 2012 (NZ)
- Location: London, Ottawa, Sydney, Washington, D.C. & Auckland
- Participants: Australian Youth Climate Coalition, Canadian Youth Climate Coalition, Energy Action Coalition, Indian Youth Climate Network, UK Youth Climate Coalition, 350.org Aotearoa
- Website: PowerShift.org.nz

Power Shift is an annual youth summit which has been held in New Zealand, Australia, Canada, the United Kingdom and the United States. Other Power Shift Conferences are also being organised by members of the International Youth Climate Movement including Africa, Japan and India. The focus of the events is on climate change policy.

== History ==
Logo of the 2009 Power Shift conference

The first Power Shift conference was held from November 2 to 5, 2007 in Washington, D.C., and was organised by the Energy Action Coalition. The second American conference occurred two years later on February 27 to March 2, 2009.

Following on from the success of the American format, the Australian Youth Climate Coalition organised a Power Shift event in Sydney, Australia, on July 11 to July 13, 2009. Similarly, the UK Youth Climate Coalition has scheduled the first British version of the event to run from October 9 to October 12, 2009. The first New Zealand Power Shift will be run between the 7th and 9 December 2012 in Auckland.

The aim of the Power Shift Conferences is to build the youth climate movement in their respective nations, which is achieved through workshops, expert panel discussions, keynote speakers, and a lobby day or a "Day of Action" as it is alternatively known.

== American Power Shift conferences ==
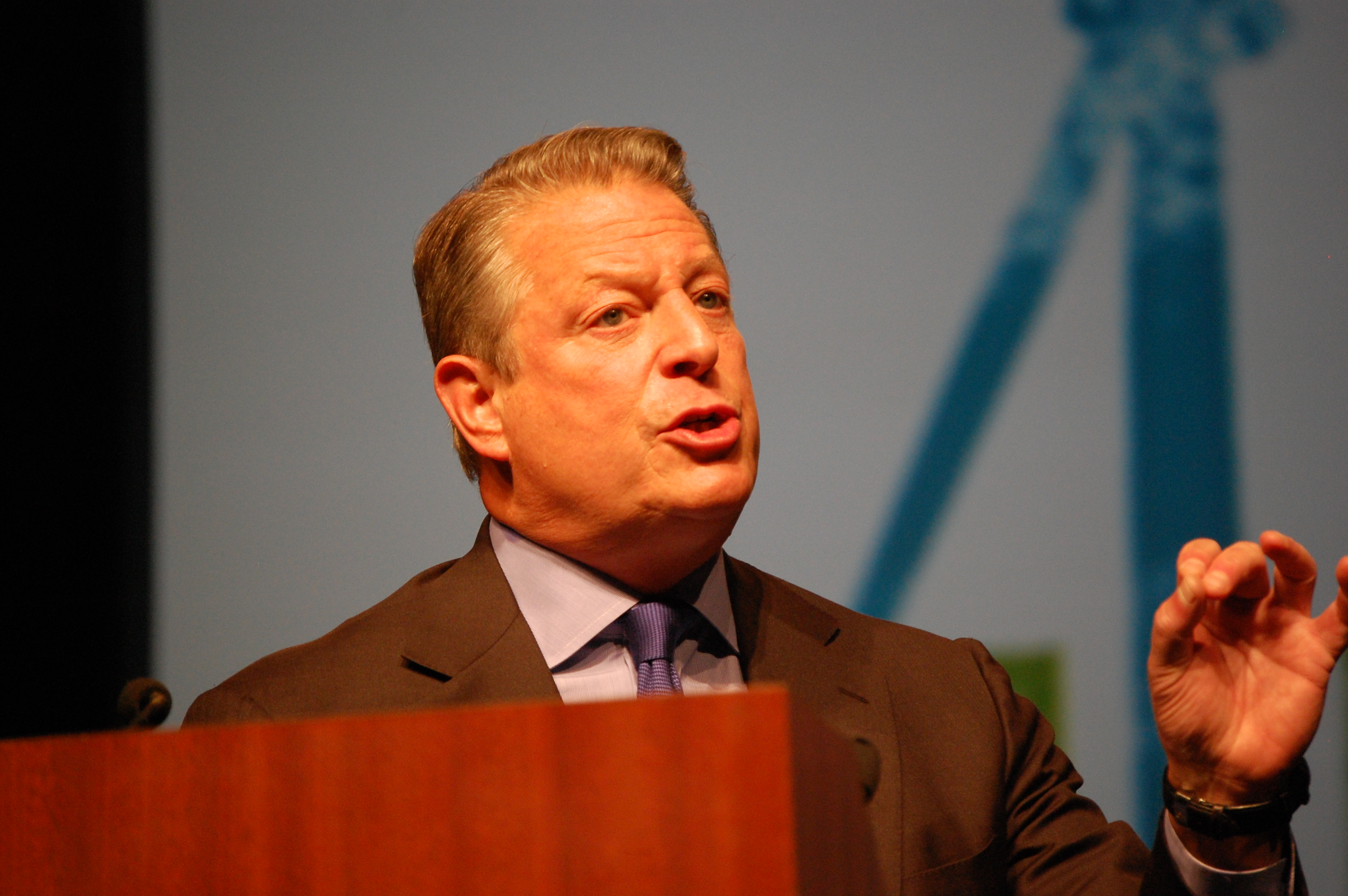
Al Gore speaking at the Power Shift 2011 in D.C.

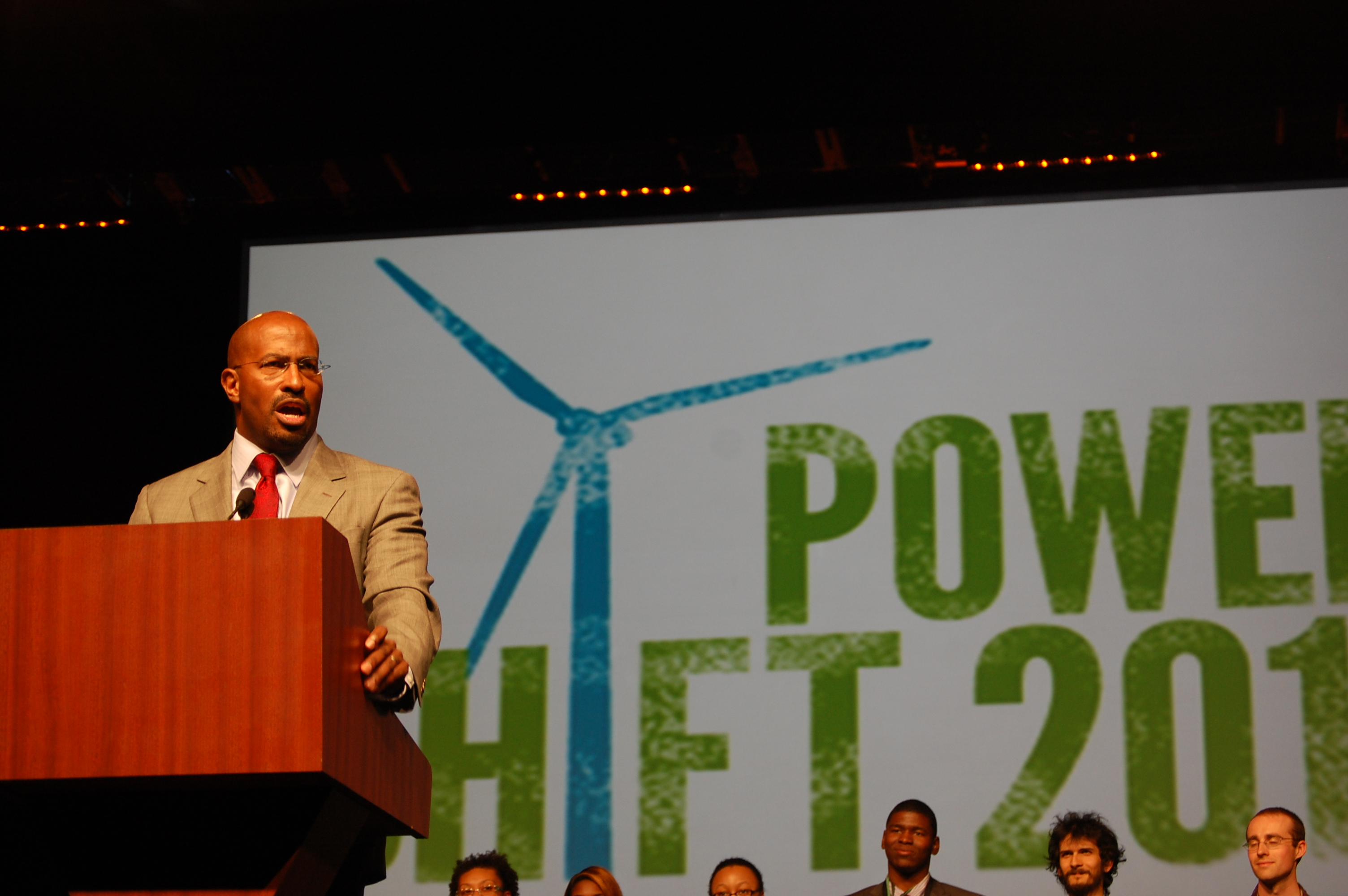
Van Jones speaking after Al Gore at the Power Shift 2011 in D.C.

The first Power Shift Conference took place from November 2 to 5 in 2007 with between 5,000 and 6,000 students and young people in attendance. It is claimed that due to the number of young people who attended the conference, it became the largest activist youth event on climate change in history. At the University of Maryland, College Park, a rally of between 2,000 and 3,000 people on the steps of the Capitol building and a Lobby Day. The event was also attended by a number of keynote speakers which included Al Gore. The main aim of the first conference was to urge elected officials to pass legislation which would include three planks taken from the platform of the climate advocacy coalition 1Sky:

- The creation of a 5 million-strong Clean Energy Job Corps
- The reduction of greenhouse gases to 80 percent below 1990 levels by 2050, which scientists say is the baseline for mitigating the worst effects of global warming
- A moratorium on new coal plants and divestment from fossil fuel and highway subsidies.

On February 27 to March 2, 2009, the second American Power Shift Conference took place. Similarly to the first summit, it included workshops, panel discussions, and speakers focusing on addressing climate change and environmental justice. Casper ter Kuile the co-director of the UK Youth Climate Coalition states that it is more than a youth movement, it is "social movement" . This time, keynote speakers included Van Jones, Bill McKibben of 350.org, Ralph Nader, and Speaker of the House Nancy Pelosi.

The third American Power Shift took place April 15 to 18, 2011, in Washington, D.C., at the Walter E. Washington Convention Center. The conference had over 10,000 attenders. People came to support various environmental movements, a number of them in protest of President Barack Obama's alleged weakness on environmental issues. Guest speakers included former U.S. vice-president Al Gore, Greenpeace Executive Director Phil Radford, and environmental advocate Van Jones.

The fourth Power Shift conference in the US was also the first outside of Washington. It was instead held in Pittsburgh, Pennsylvania, at the David L. Lawrence Convention Center on October 19–21, 2013. Keynote speakers included Gasland director Josh Fox, Sierra Club director Michael Brune, and Kandi Mossett of the Indigenous Environmental Network. The program included a rally against coal production and the organization of protests against the Keystone XL Pipeline.

=== 2006 conferences ===
In 2006, a series of student conferences on energy security were organized under the name PowerShift by the 20/20 Vision Education Fund, a 501(c)(3) organization based out of Maryland. (They were not affiliated with the 2007 and later Power Shift conferences organized by the Energy Action Coalition.) Over 250 people participated in the first conference which took place in Kalamazoo, MI on April 1, 2006, and featured former Central Intelligence Agency director Jim Woolsey giving a keynote speech on U.S. oil dependence and national security. The conferences also featured a simulated energy wargame called Oil Shockwave, developed by non-profit groups Securing America's Future Energy (SAFE) and the National Commission on Energy Policy. The website for the conference series has been taken down, but is viewable using the Internet Wayback Machine.

== Australian Power Shift conferences ==
Two years later in 2009, the Australian Youth Climate Coalition, in partnership with the University of Western Sydney, GetUp and Greenpeace, organised the Australian Power Shift Conference on July 11 to 13, 2009. Approximately 1,500 young people attended the summit. Guests included former Vice President of the United States Al Gore, the swimmer Ian Thorpe and the actress Brooke Satchwell. The event concluded with a flashmob action outside the Sydney Opera House. In 2010, the AYCC held three regional Power Shift Conferences in Adelaide, Canberra and Geelong.

In 2011, the AYCC organised Power Shift Conferences in Perth and Brisbane with over 1,000 young people. Speakers included Bill McKibben, Kumi Naidoo, Anna Rose, Dick Smith and Dr. Karl Kruszelnicki.

In 2013, the AYCC will hold Australia's largest ever Power Shift, in Melbourne from July 13–15.

In 2022, Power Shift is set to be held in the city of Brisbane from September 23–25.

== Canadian Power Shift conference ==
The first Canadian Power Shift event was held from October 23 to October 26, 2009, in Ottawa, Ontario, by the Canadian Youth Climate Coalition. Subsequent summits were held in Ottawa, ON in 2012; Victoria, BC in 2013; Halifax, NS in 2014; and Edmonton, AB in 2016.

== New Zealand Power Shift summit ==
A collaboration between 350.org Aotearoa and Generation Zero, a student environmental movement, and other individuals, will bring "Power Shift NZ-Pacific" to New Zealand for the first time, December 7–9, 2012, at the University of Auckland.

Confirmed speakers so far include; American Environmentalist Bill McKibben, Mayor of Auckland Len Brown and Xena: Warrior Princess actress Lucy Lawless.

== UK Power Shift conferences ==
On October 9–12, 2009, the UK version of Power Shift was held at the Institute of Education in London. Modelled on a similar event to one organised by the Australian Youth Climate Coalition and carrying the same name as the Energy Action Coalition event in the US, the event intended to develop the youth climate movement and provide young people with training on public speaking. The training was based on the techniques developed by Marshall Ganz, a civil rights activist who is credited with devising the successful grassroots organizing model and public narrative training for 2008 Barack Obama presidential campaign. The Power Shift event intended to serve as a feeder to the International Day of Action organised by 350.org on October 24.

A PowerShift UK event scheduled in 2011 was cancelled, but large-scale youth climate movement events have been taking place annually under the name Shared Planet since 1999, organised by the UK's largest student-led climate campaigning network People & Planet.

On May 3–4, 2014, a Power Shift UK event was held in London, titled 'Breaking Down the Barriers and Diversifying the Climate Movement'. Open to people from all walks of society who want to contribute to action on climate change, the event brought people across the UK together for a weekend of discussions and workshops, to share stories and ideas for action, and to challenge assumptions about diversifying the climate movement.

== See also ==
- Politics of global warming
- Youth Climate Movement
