= Friends of the Earth Europe =

European branch of Friends of the Earth International

Friends of the Earth Europe (FoEE)
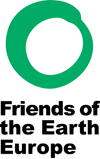
- FoEE logo
- Type: Non-governmental organization
- Purpose: Environmentalism, sustainability, human rights
- Location: Brussels, Belgium
- Region served: Global
- Method: Lobbying, research, direct action
- Members: 33 national member groups
- Key people: Jagoda Munič (Director); David Heller; Adrian Bebb; Paul de Clerck; Agnieszka Komoch
- Website: friendsoftheearth.eu

Friends of the Earth Europe (FoEE) is the European branch of the world's largest grassroots environmental network, Friends of the Earth International (FOEI). It includes 33 national organizations and thousands of local groups.

The Friends of the Earth Europe office in Brussels fulfills a number of functions. It represents the network's member groups towards the European institutions aiming to influence EU-policymaking; raises public awareness of environmental issues; runs capacity building projects for its membership, and is a secretariat for its 33 national members. The FoEE office is located in a sustainable building housing Belgian and European NGOs near the European Parliament in Brussels.

== FoEE Member organisations ==
Country	Name	Website
Austria	Global 2000	
Belgium (Flanders & Brussels)	Friends of the Earth Vlaanderen & Brussel (Friends of the Earth Flanders & Brussels)	
Belgium (Wallonia)	Amis de la Terre Belgique	
Bosnia and Herzegovina	Centar za životnu sredinu (Center for Environment)	
Bulgaria	Za Zemiata (For the Earth)	
Croatia	Zelena Akcija (Green Action)	
Cyprus	Friends of the Earth Cyprus	
Czech Republic	Hnutí Duha (Rainbow Movement)	
Denmark	NOAH	
England/Wales/Northern Ireland (EWNI)	Friends of the Earth (EWNI)	
Estonia	Eesti Roheline Liikumine (Estonian Green Movement)	
Finland	Maan ystävät (Friends of the Earth)	
France	Les Amis de la Terre (Friends of the Earth - France)	
Georgia	Sakartvelos Mtsvaneta Modzraoba (Greens Movement of Georgia)	
Germany	Bund für Umwelt und Naturschutz Deutschland (BUND)	
Hungary	Magyar Természetvédok Szövetsége (National Society of Conservationists)	
Ireland	Friends of the Earth	
Latvia	Zemes Draugi (Friends of the Earth)	
Lithuania	Lietuvos Zaliuju Judéjimas (Lithuanian Green Movement)	
Luxembourg	Mouvement Ecologique (Ecological Movement)	
Macedonia	Dvizhenje na Ekologistite na Makedonija (Ecologists Movement of Macedonia)	
Malta	Moviment ghall-Ambjent (Friends of the Earth (Malta))	
The Netherlands	Vereniging Milieudefensie (Environmental Defence)	
Norway	Norges Naturvernforbund (Norwegian Society for the Conservation of Nature)	
Poland	Polski Klub Ekologiczny (Polish Ecological Club)	
Scotland	Friends of the Earth Scotland	
Slovakia	Priatelia Zeme Slovensko (Friends of the Earth Slovakia)	
Slovenia	Focus	
Spain	Amigos de la Tierra (Friends of the Earth)	
Sweden	Jordens Vänner (Friends of the Earth)	
Switzerland	Pro Natura	
Ukraine	Zelenyi Svit	

== Campaigns ==
The current campaign priorities of Friends of the Earth Europe are:

- Climate justice and energy
- Food, agriculture and biodiversity
- Economic justice
- Resource justice and sustainability

=== Climate justice and energy ===
Friends of the Earth Europe is "working to create the much-needed, fair and urgent transition to a fossil fuel free Europe. It wants to deliver a 100% renewable, no nuclear, super energy-efficient, zero-fossil-fuel Europe by 2030."

The organization calls for radical improvements in energy efficiency, an accelerated phase-out of fossil fuels, a dramatic shift towards community-owned renewable energies, and reduced overall resource consumption and lifestyle changes. This often means targeting extractive industries, especially those who are involved in fracking and tar sands extraction.

=== Food, agriculture and biodiversity ===
The organization has been a key participant in the European movement against GMOs which has been successful in stopping the planting of GM crops across most of Europe.

The organization advocates for more environmentally friendly, equitable and sustainable farming. This includes campaigning to reform the European Common Agricultural Policy (CAP) in ways that can mitigate climate change emissions (especially through reducing reliance on soy imports for livestock), protect biodiversity, and stop the collapse of family farming in Europe's agriculture sector.

FoEE has also been active in its opposition to EU trade deals, such as the CETA agreement with Canada and TTIP with the US, because of a belief that those trade deals do not support human rights and the environment.

One of FoEE's campaigns aims to protect nature and biodiversity by supporting local groups in their preservation initiatives.

=== Economic Justice ===
Friends of the Earth Europe's economic justice program is occupied with the influence of companies over EU decision-making and the economic, social and environmental consequences of corporate practices. It works to expose cases of corporate capture of EU regulation and examples of the influence of corporate interests over EU policy process which often results in a lack of regulation or weak regulation.

The program looks into the issue of European companies which have subsidiaries outside of Europe. Such subsidiaries of multinational companies often fail to respect EU laws and workers’ rights when operating abroad, and victims too often do not have access to justice. It campaigns for guarantees that companies abide by the same safety and social standards for their workers and facilities outside of Europe as in Europe; and that European companies are held accountable for their practices outside of Europe, in particular in cases of abuses.

In the area of lobby transparency, FoEE looks at how companies exert their influence over and sometimes directly shape decision-making in the EU. It campaigns in favor of transparency in business influence and more balanced representation of stakeholders in EU policy making. FoEE has been active in exposing cases of revolving door scandals, misleading lobby registrations and deceptive lobby practices. It has been lobbying EU Commission and Parliament in favor of stricter EU legislation in order to close the current loopholes and prevent such scandals.

=== Resource justice and sustainability ===
FoEE recognizes and promotes the environmental, economic and social benefits of reducing Europe's resource consumption. They focus on reducing Europe's land, water, materials and carbon use – including the embedded resources Europe consumes beyond its borders.

The organization promotes the reuse and recycling of materials, opposes incineration, and is calling for the full implementation of the Sustainable Development Goals and the EU 2030 Agenda.

== School of Sustainability ==
FoEE's School of Sustainability project is inspired by the Latin American Escuela de la Sustentabilidad. Driven by popular education techniques, the project aims to strengthen the regional network of Friends of the Earth Europe, and create common political analyses for a system of change from environmental justice and human rights abuses to challenging power.

== Coalitions ==
FoEE is an active member of many coalitions working on environmental issues in Europe including:

- The Green 10, consisting of BirdLife International (European Community Office), Climate Action Network Europe (CAN Europe), CEE Bankwatch Network, European Environmental Bureau (EEB), European Federation for Transport and Environment (T&E), Health and Environment Alliance, Greenpeace Europe, International Friends of Nature (IFN), WWF European Policy Office and Friends of the Earth Europe.
- The Alliance for Lobbying Transparency and Ethics Regulation (ALTER-EU): FoEE is one of the founding and current steering group members of the Alliance for Lobbying Transparency and Ethics Regulation (ALTER-EU), which was launched in Brussels in July 2005. ALTER-EU gathers 160 civil society groups that are concerned by the growing influence of the corporate sector on EU decision-making.
- The European Coalition for Corporate Justice

== Youth Network (Young Friends of the Earth Europe) ==
In 2007 a youth network called Young Friends of the Earth Europe (YFoEE), was established by national Young Friends of the Earth groups affiliated to FoE member groups. YFoEE is an autonomous and self organised youth-led network, with structures and ways of working set and led by young people, yet retains strong links to Friends of the Earth Europe and the Friends of the Earth International Federation and their mission, vision and values.

The YFoEE network unites youth organisations and youth groups working on social and environmental justice in Europe, and runs campaigning and educational activities for young people on a European level. It consists of youth member groups in 15 countries from both EU and Non EU countries, including Natur og Ungdom (Norway), BUNDjugend (Germany) or YFoE Ukraine.

The key campaigning topic of the network since 2007 has been advocating for climate justice, in particular opposing what it considers to be false solutions to climate change, such as nuclear energy, and educating young people to create a youth movement for climate justice. In 2010, YFoEE hosted a parallel convergence to the COP16 UN Climate Talks in Cancún, Mexico, in Brussels, Belgium as an alternative forum to the International political negotiations and to build the regional European Youth Climate Movement.

YFoEE has been active as part of the Youth Climate Movement and youth delegation at the UNFCCC international climate negotiations, and is one of the founding members of European Youth Climate Movement.

=== Ways of working ===
The YFoEE network is supported by a secretariat in the office of FoEE in Brussels, and coordinated by a Steering Group of 8 volunteers, elected from the YFoEE network annually at the Annual General Meeting. Campaigns and events are led and developed by individual volunteers and representatives of member groups who make up working groups.

== Revenue ==
Friends of the Earth Europe receives funding from a variety of government and non-government sources. These include the European Commission under the ‘LIFE+ regulation’, the European Climate Foundation, Oak Foundation, and Isvara Foundation, amongst others. It also gets membership fees from national Friends of the Earth groups.
