= Climate movement =

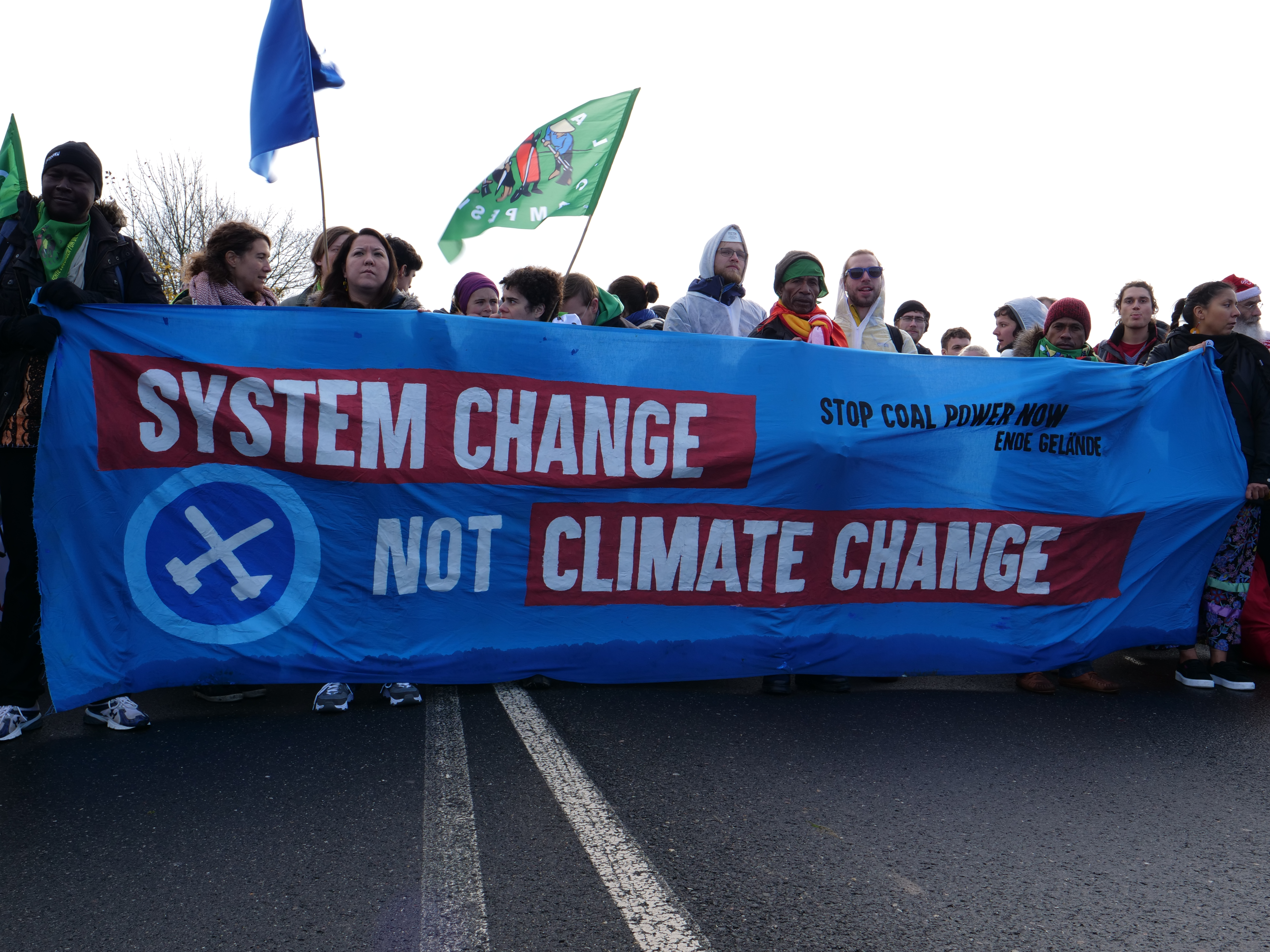
Banner "System change, not climate change" at Ende Gelände 2017 in Germany

The climate movement is a global social movement focused on pressuring governments and industry to take action addressing the causes and impacts of climate change. Citizens, environmental non-profit organizations, and companies have engaged in significant climate activism since the late 1980s and early 1990s, as they sought to influence the United Nations Framework Convention on Climate Change (UNFCCC). Climate activism has become increasingly prominent over time, gaining significant momentum during the 2009 Copenhagen Summit and particularly following the signing of the Paris Agreement in 2016. It is aimed at raising awareness of environmental issues, changing people's behaviour, and influencing policy and legislation.

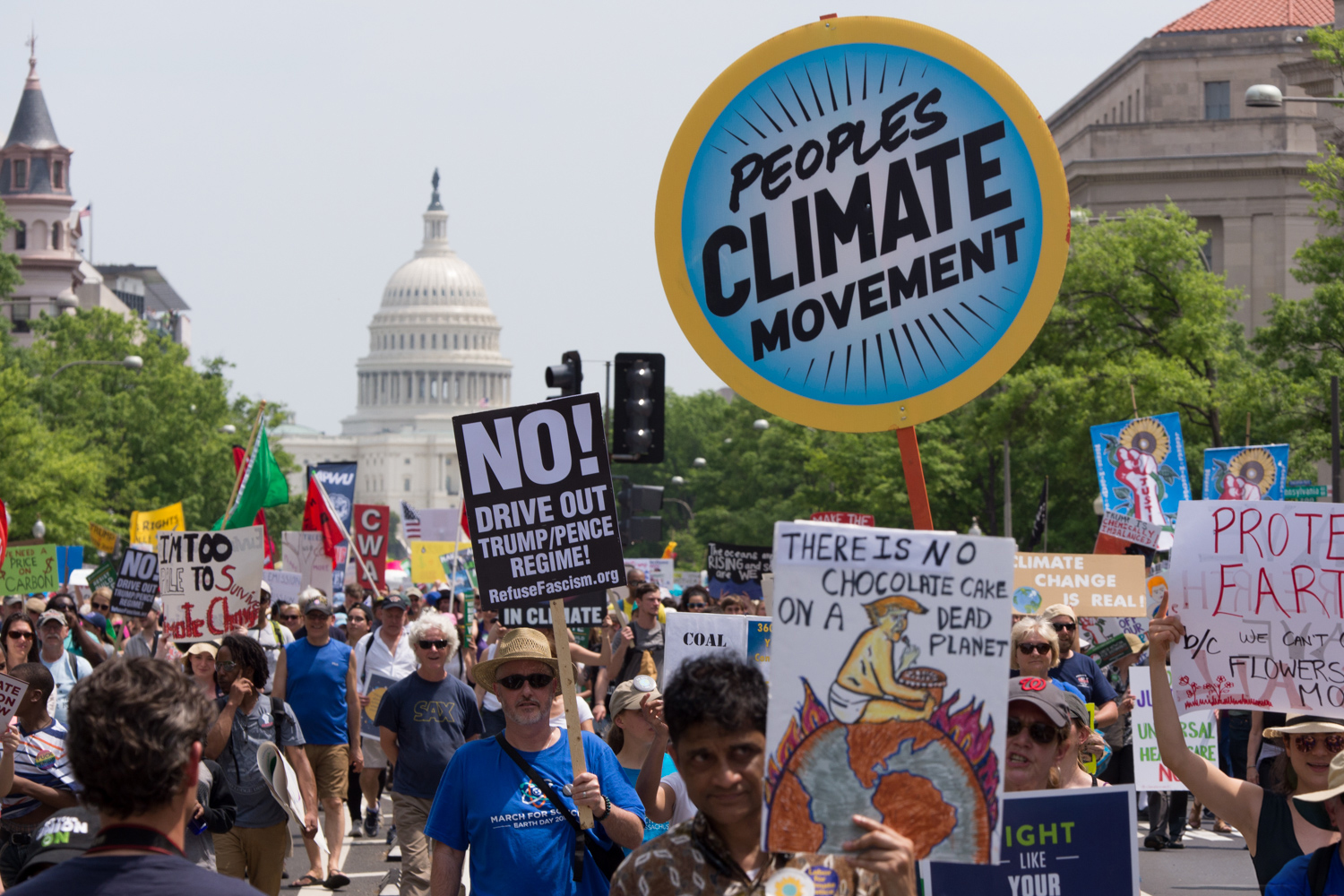
Climate change march in Washington, D.C. on 29 April 2017

Environmental organizations take various actions such as Peoples Climate Marches. A major event was the global climate strike in September 2019 organized by Fridays For Future and Earth Strike. The goal was to influence the climate action summit organized by the UN on 23 September. According to the organizers, four million people participated in the strike on 20 September. Youth activism and involvement has played an important part in the evolution of the movement after the growth of the Fridays For Future strikes started by Greta Thunberg in 2019. In 2019, Extinction Rebellion organized large protests including blocking roads, demanding that the government "reduce carbon emissions to zero by 2025, and create a citizens' assembly to oversee progress.”

== History ==
Until the 19th century, Western thought traditionally cast nature, including the climate, as fundamentally unchanging, untouchable by human influence. Thinkers such as George Perkins Marsh, who wrote the 1864 book Man and Nature, began to change this narrative. Most of the early work done to draw attention to human impact on nature was more directly related to ecology than climate, such as Aldo Leopold's 1949 book A Sand County Almanac, but the idea that humans do affect ecosystems was important to the creation of the climate movement.

In 1962, Rachel Carson, a marine biologist, author, and environmental activist, wrote Silent Spring describing how pesticides contaminate the food chain, harm wildlife, and cause illnesses. The book served as a powerful exposé on the environmental devastation caused by indiscriminate pesticide use. Carson’s critique of the government's failure to protect public health and wildlife advanced the global environmental movement.

Since the early 1970s, climate activists have called for more effective political action regarding climate change and other environmental issues. In 1970, Earth Day was the first large-scale environmental movement that called for the protection of all life on earth. The Friends of Earth organization was also founded in 1970.

Activism related to climate change continued in the late 1980s, when major environmental organizations became involved in the discussions about climate, mainly in the UNFCCC framework. Environmental organizations had previously primarily been engaged at the domestic level, but they began to increasingly engage in international campaigning.

Even with the large public support for government action on climate change, there has been little sustained grassroots mobilization in the United States. Since Dr. James Hansen's 1988 testimony before Congress, the institutionalized U.S. climate movement has expanded significantly, supported by international initiatives such as the UNFCC, the 1997 Kyoto Protocol, and the 2009 Copenhagen summit. By 2010, over 460 organizations were involved in national climate efforts, yet large-scale citizen activism remained limited, revealing a gap between institutional progress and public engagement.

The largest transnational climate change coalition, Climate Action Network, was founded in 1992. Its major members include Greenpeace, WWF, Oxfam and Friends of the Earth. Climate Justice Now! and Climate Justice Action, two major coalitions, were founded in the lead-up to the 2009 Copenhagen Summit.

Between 2006 and 2009, the Campaign against Climate Change and other British organisations staged a series of demonstrations to encourage governments to make more serious attempts to address climate change.

The 2009 United Nations Climate Change Conference in Copenhagen was the first UNFCCC summit in which the climate movement started showing its mobilization power at a large scale. According to Jennifer Hadden, the number of new NGOs registered with the UNFCCC surged in 2009 in the lead-up to the Copenhagen summit. Between 40,000 and 100,000 people attended a march in Copenhagen on December 12 calling for a global agreement on climate. Activism went beyond Copenhagen, with more than 5,400 rallies and demonstrations took place around the world simultaneously.

In 2019, activists, most of whom were young people, participated in a global climate strike to criticise the lack of international and political action to address the worsening impacts of climate change. Greta Thunberg, a young activist from Sweden, became a figurehead for the School Strike For Climate movement.

== Methods ==
Climate activists are sometimes depicted as dangerous radicals, but the truly dangerous radicals are the countries that are increasing the production of fossil fuels.

— António Guterres, Secretary-General of the United Nations, 2022

Presenting data and other facts is less effective in motivating people to act to mitigate climate change, than financial incentives and social pressure involved in showing people climate-related actions of other people.

The strongest factors in self-reported changes in opinion about global warming were Republican party identification, seeing others experience impacts of global warming, and learning more about global warming.

These are several approaches that have been used in the past by climate advocates and advocacy campaigns:

- the provision of information,
- framing of information about aspects of global climate change, and
- challenging the terms of political debates.

All three of these methods have been implemented in climate campaigns aimed at the general public. The information about the impacts of global climate change plays a role in forming climatic beliefs, attitudes, and behavior, while the effects of other approaches (e.g. provision of information about solutions to GCC, consensus framing, use of mechanistic information) is yet mostly unknown. The third approach is to create space for discussions that move beyond questions of economic interests that often dominate political debates to emphasize ecological values and grass-roots democracy. This has been argued to be crucial to bringing about more significant structural change. Some politicians, such as Arnold Schwarzenegger with the slogan "terminate pollution", say that activists should generate optimism by focusing on the health co-benefits of climate action.

=== Climate disobedience ===
Climate disobedience is a form of civil disobedience, deliberate action intended to critique government climate policy. In 2008, American climate activist Tim DeChristopher posed as a bidder at an auction of US Bureau of Land Management oil and gas leases of public land in Utah, won the auction, reneged on payment, and was imprisoned for 21 months. In September 2015, five climate activists known as the Delta 5 obstructed an oil train in Everett, Washington. At trial, the Delta 5 were allowed the necessity defense, that is, breaking a law in the service of preventing a greater harm. After testimony, the judge determined the grounds for the necessity defense were not met and instructed the jury to disregard testimony admitted under the necessity defense. The Delta 5 were fined for trespassing but were acquitted of more serious charges.

The first example of a judge accepting the climate necessity defense was on March 27, 2018 when Judge Mary Ann Driscoll acquitted all 13 defendants of civil charges from a protest held in 2016 in Boston, Massachusetts.

=== Declaring emergency state ===
Artwork of a distressed polar bear stranded on the tip of an iceberg, morphing into the Earth below the waterline. The Earth submerged in a pot of boiling water above the flames of a gas stove.

Enacting a state of emergency may be composed of two elements: declaring a state of emergency that has formulated real-world i.e. legal effects and the associated enabling or ensuring of rapid complementary large-scale changes in human activity for the articulated purposes. To date, many governments have acknowledged, sometimes in the form of tentative text-form "declarations", that humanity is essentially in a state of climate emergency.

In November 2021 Greta Thunberg with other climate activists begun filing a petition to the United Nation calling it to declare a level 3 global climate emergency. This should lead to the creation of a special team that will coordinate the response to the climate crisis in the international level. The response should be at least as strong as the response to the COVID-19 pandemic.

It has been proposed that the national security sector could play a unique role in the development of a global climate-emergency mobilisation of labour and resources to build a zero-emission economy and enact decarbonization.

Commentators and The Climate Mobilization have suggested mobilisation of resources on the scale of a war economy and other related exceptional or effective measures.

=== Focus on climate justice ===
Global warming—the progression from cooler historical temperatures (blue) to recent warmer temperatures (red)—is being experienced disproportionately by younger generations.

Successive generations are predicted to experience progressively greater unprecedented lifetime exposure (ULE) events such as heat waves. About 111 million children born in 2020 will live with unprecedented heatwave exposure in a world that warms by 3.5 °C, compared with 62 million with only 1.5 °C of warming.

Shifting away from a focus on impacts on the natural environment, in recent years people have called on decision-makers to move towards equitable mitigation strategies for all people. Climate justice acknowledges that some regions and populations are more vulnerable to climate change than others, and that in addressing climate solutions we must consider "existing vulnerabilities, resources and capabilities." A study of 800 websites and documents from Australian environmental groups identified six different dimensions of climate justice including Distributive Justice, Procedural Justice, Recognition Justice, Relational Justice, Intergenerational Justice, and Transformative Justice.

In the United States, organizations such as the Climate Justice Alliance work towards the goal of resilient economies and communities, placing "race, gender and class at the center of the solutions" by working to unite the voices of frontline communities.

=== Legal action ===
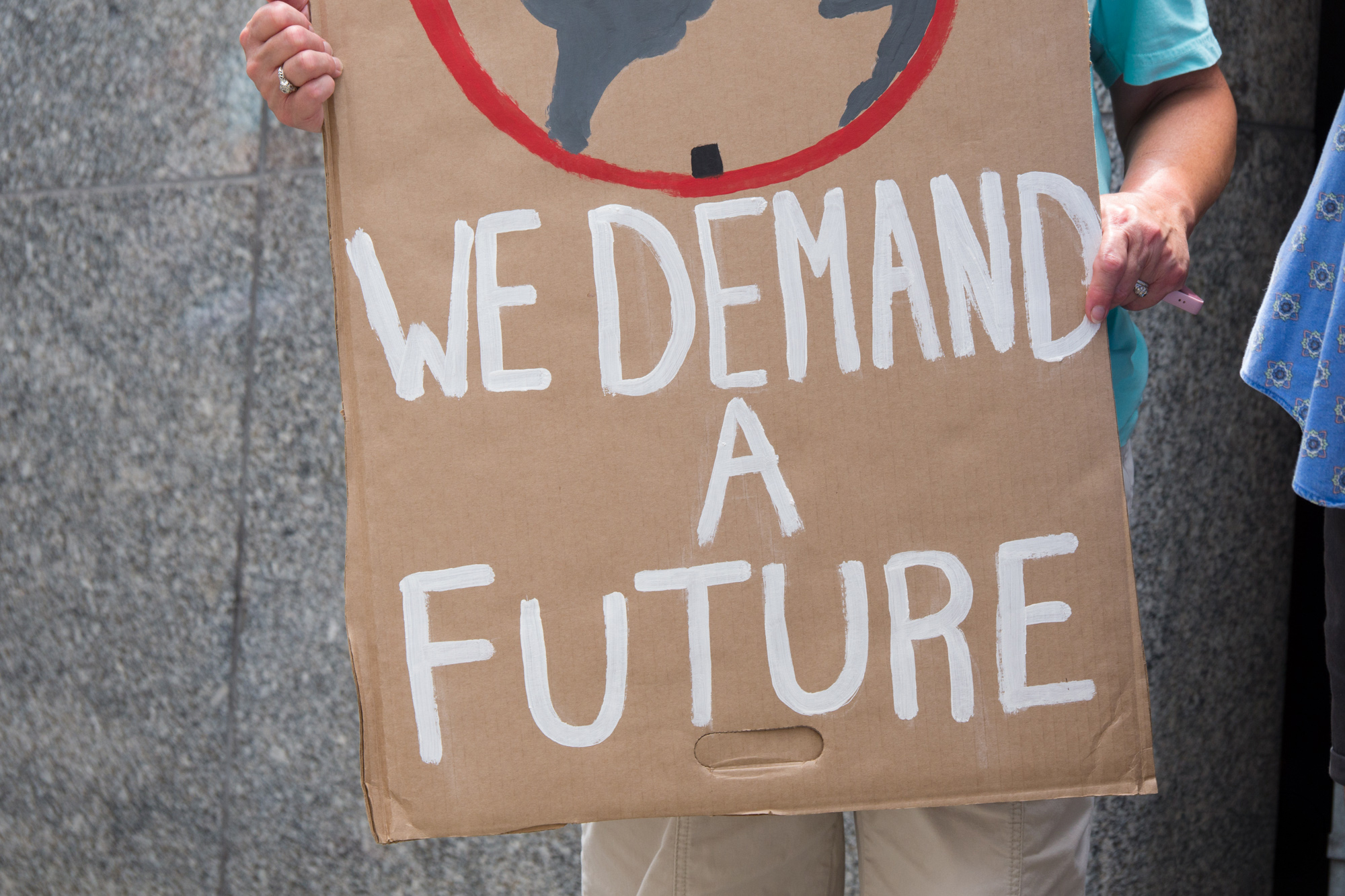
Zero Hour Climate March in Pittsburgh

In some countries, those affected by climate change may be able to sue major greenhouse gas emitters. Litigation has been attempted by entire countries and peoples, such as Palau and the Inuit, as well as non-governmental organizations such as the Sierra Club. Investor-owned coal, oil, and gas corporations could be legally and morally liable for climate-related human rights violations. Litigation is often carried out via collective pooling of effort and resources such as via organizations like Greenpeace, which sued a Polish coal utility and a German car manufacturer.

Proving that some weather events are due specifically to global warming is now possible, and methodologies have been developed to show the increased risk of other events caused by global warming.

For a legal action for negligence (or similar) to succeed, "Plaintiffs ... must show that, more probably than not, their individual injuries were caused by the risk factor in question, as opposed to any other cause. This has sometimes been translated to a requirement of a relative risk of at least two." Another route (though with little legal bite) is the World Heritage Convention, if it can be shown that climate change is affecting World Heritage Sites like Mount Everest.

==== Of countries' governments ====
Besides countries suing one another, there are also cases where people in a country have taken legal steps against their own government.

In the Netherlands and Belgium, organisations such as the foundation Urgenda and the Klimaatzaak in Belgium have also sued their governments as they believe their governments are not meeting the emission reductions they agreed to. Urgenda have already won their case against the Dutch government.

In 2021, Germany's supreme constitutional court ruled that the government's climate protection measures are insufficient to protect future generations and that the government had until the end of 2022 to improve its Climate Protection Act.

Held v. Montana was the first constitutional law climate lawsuit to go to trial in the United States, on June 12, 2023. The case was filed in March 2020 by sixteen youth residents of Montana, then aged 2 through 18, who argued that the state's support of the fossil fuel industry had worsened the effects of climate change on their lives, thus denying their right to a "clean and healthful environment in Montana for present and future generations"^{:Art. IX, § 1} as required by the Constitution of Montana. On August 14, 2023, the trial court judge ruled in the youth plaintiffs' favor, though the state indicated it would appeal the decision. Montana's Supreme Court heard oral arguments on July 10, 2024, its seven justices taking the case under advisement. On December 18, 2024, the Montana Supreme Court upheld the county court ruling.

==== Of companies ====
In May 2021, in Milieudefensie et al v Royal Dutch Shell, the district court of The Hague ordered Royal Dutch Shell to cut its global carbon emissions by 45% by the end of 2030 compared to 2019 levels.

=== Fossil fuel divestment ===
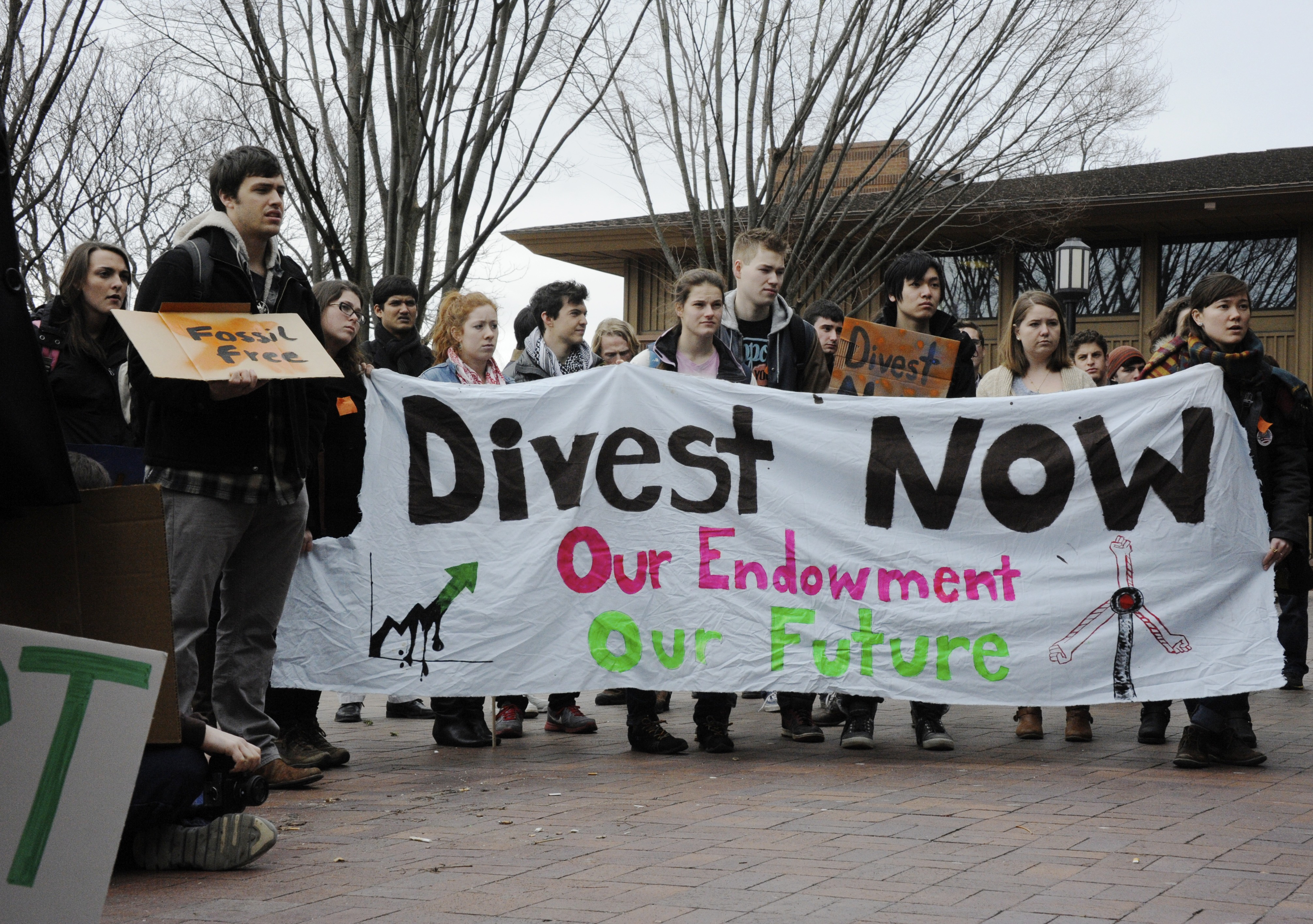
Students at Tufts University "marched forth on March 4th"

Fossil fuel divestment is an attempt to reduce climate change by exerting social, political, and economic pressure for the institutional divestment of assets including stocks, bonds, and other financial instruments connected to companies involved in extracting fossil fuels.

Fossil fuel divestment campaigns emerged on college and university campuses in the United States in 2011 with students urging their administrations to turn endowment investments in the fossil fuel industry into investments in clean energy and communities most impacted by climate change. In 2012, Unity College in Maine became the first institution of higher learning to divest its endowment from fossil fuels. While fossil fuel divestment focusses on financial asset management, a related movement, Fossil Free Research, campaigns for universities to stop accepting research funding and sponsorships from fossil fuel companies.

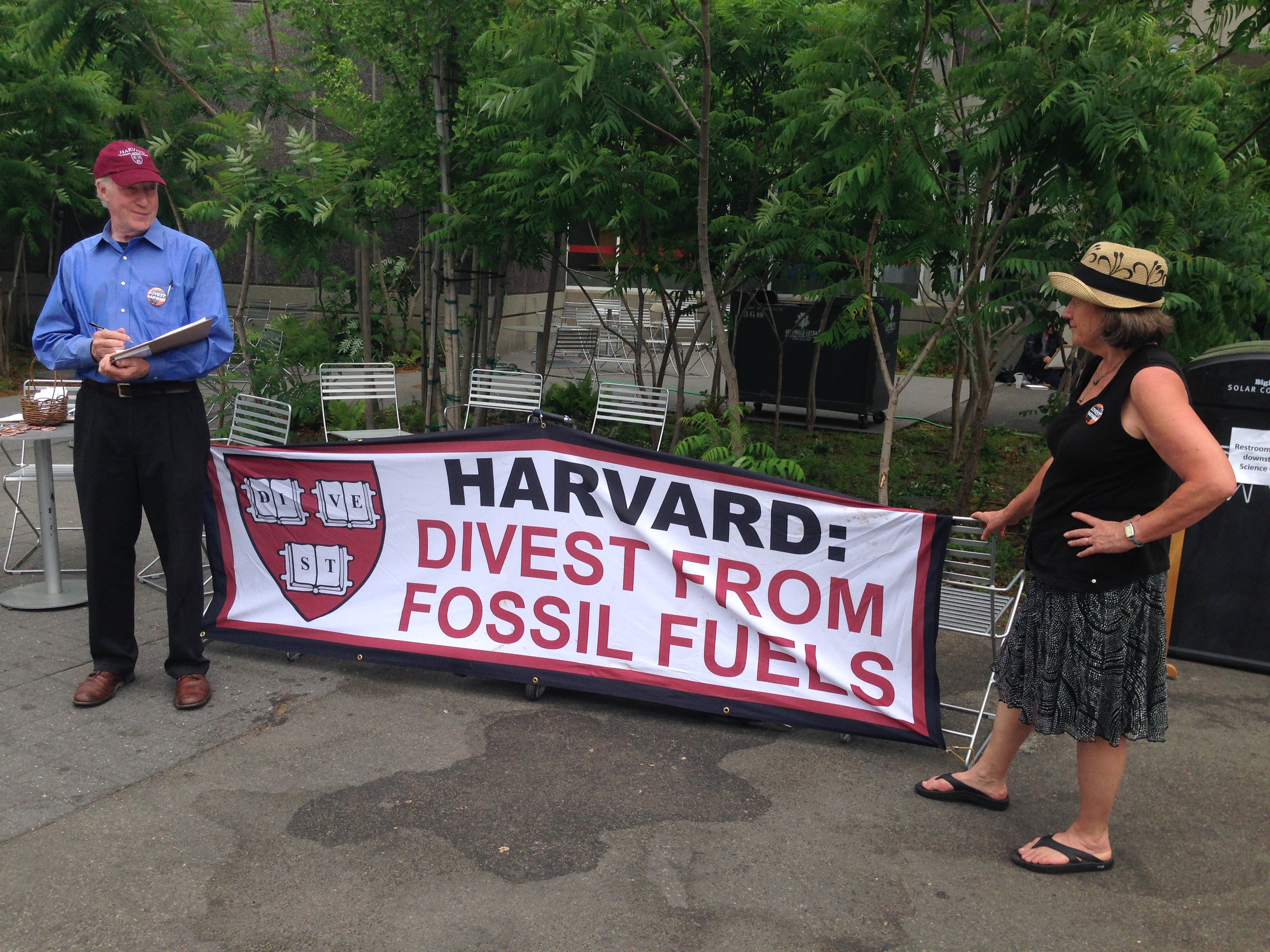
Harvard fossil fuel divestment petition

The divestment movement against fossil fuels has shed a different light on conversations surrounding fossil fuel finance. Banks and investors have been increasingly questioning the viability of the fossil fuel sector in the long-term. This is because this disinvestment movement is stigmatizing fossil fuels and is raising uncertainty around continued use of fossil fuels, thus reducing the financial desirability of fossil fuel assets. Because the extraction, exploration, and mining of fossil fuels are all capital-intensive activities, uncertainty around their financial risks can reduce investment. If there is a reduction in the supply of capital or a rise in the costs of capital, fossil fuel projects will end up being uneconomical. This will make the valuation of fossil fuel companies go down making them to go out of the market.

The main argument behind fossil fuel divestment campaigns is that earning profits from investments in activities associated with fossil fuels is unethical as fossil fuel emissions are the primary drivers responsible for global climate change. Fossil Fuel divestment campaigns such as the Go Fossil Free campaign by 350.org are pleading with the investors to divest by immediately freezing any new investments that they might make in any fossil fuel companies and to divest from any direct ownership and commingled funds, such as fossil fuels public equities together with corporate bonds, in the next five years.

Fossil fuel divestment campaign have three primary aims. One of them is to pressure government across the globe to put legislation in place including carbon tax or banning any further drilling of fossil fuels. The second aim is to pressure fossil fuel companies to enact transformative change in their companies by switching to forms of energy supply that are less carbon-intensive in nature. The third aim is to ensure transparency when it comes to the carbon exposure that is caused by fossil fuel companies and also to put pressure on governments across the globe to play an active role in restricting the extraction of fossil fuels.

Fossil fuel divestment campaigns thus seek to cut everything that would be required for the growth and survival of the fossil fuel industry. These include the social license that this industry requires to operate, the political license that the fossil fuel industry needs to grow and to survive, and the financial investments that support its existence, survival, and growth. These campaigns also seek to pressure governments to play their role in trying to limit emissions. In these campaigns, campaigners demand so see that the public institutions server their ties that they have always had with this fossil fuel industry for the main purpose of tarnishing the reputation of the fossil fuel industry and to challenge the power that the industry has. By doing these, these campaigners thus want to starve fossil fuel companies of the badly needed capital and to remove both the infrastructure and the influence that this industry has.

Divestment campaigns have been used for a variety of social justice issues in the past. For example, divestment campaigns have been launched to end investment in South Africa during apartheid, Israel, and Sudan, and against the tobacco industry. Most recently, divestment campaigns have focused on private prisons and the fossil fuel industry. These divestment calls have received a lot of attention with varying outcomes.

The increase in fossil fuel divestment commitments since 2000 suggests that divestment campaigns may be effective. These divestment commitments have resulted in reductions in the flow of capital into the gas and oil sector, as experienced in 33 countries across the globe between the years 2000 and 2015. Research has found that increasing gas and oil divestment pledges in various countries has also been influenced by divestment campaigns. More stringent environmental policies have also been enacted by regimes that recognize climate change as a threat to their country.

Fossil fuel divestment has gained traction over the last few years and transformed from being an unconventional idea to becoming a movement currently valued at around $14.5 trillion. It has over one thousand endowments, pension plans, and major investors committed. It has made many retail investors and institutional investors channeling their money towards environmentally conscious funds.

=== Hunger striking ===
Sustained hunger striking, used in several social justice campaigns in the 19th and 20th centuries, has been used a climate tactic since at least 2021, including by the American Sunrise Movement and in Berlin, Germany under the banner "Starve until you are honest".

== Public environmental activism ==
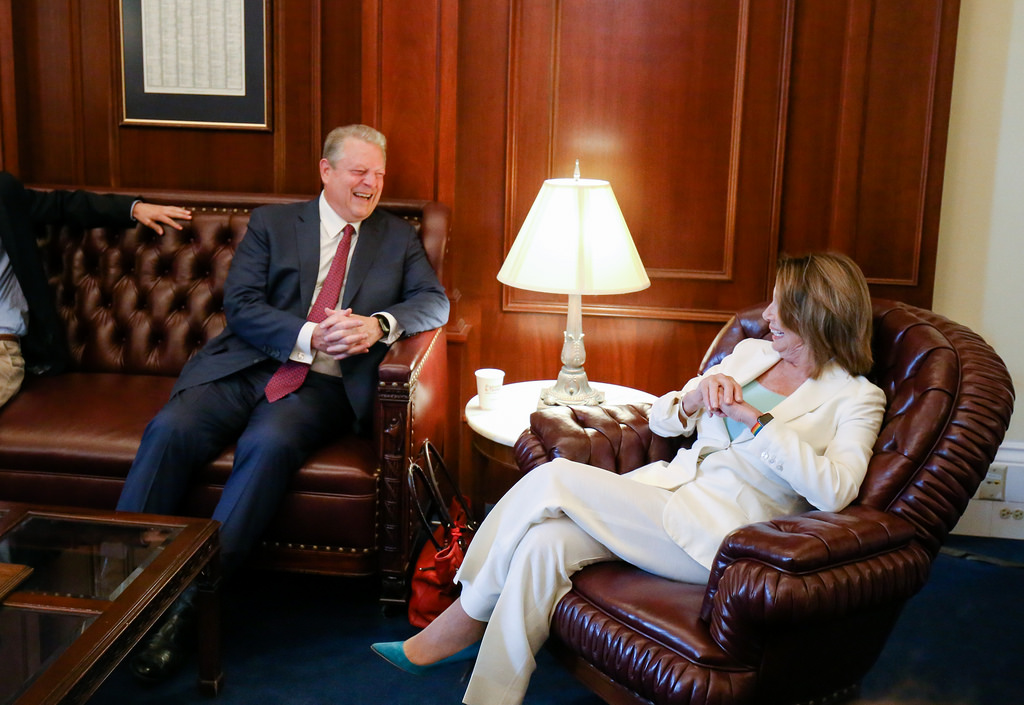
Al Gore Pelosi 2017 -Combatting Climate Change Congresswoman Pelosi meets with former Vice President Al Gore where they discussed the urgent need for action on climate change, and Governor Brown's leadership in continuing California's commitment to the Paris Climate Agreement

This type of citizen activism is important to creating a path to systemic change that will benefit the environment. This change can be assisted through government involvement by way of making more environmentally-conscious policies and all-encompassing changes that will be needed to make substantial environmental change. Different strategies, actions, and systems are used by citizen environmental activists for the purpose of supporting and in some cases demanding these environmental changes. There are however, issues that this type of activism faces. Issues such as potential decline in favorability and participation in environmental movements in BRIC countries, barriers to environmental citizen involvement and mobilization, and divergence in goals between environmental movements.

=== Creating change ===
Changes in interest in climate change, as measured by use of "climate change" as a Google search term

Individual, voluntary activism is not enough to make a substantial difference in prominent climate change issues, systematic change is. Carol Booth puts forward that the harm in "bystanding to inadequate laws, policies and programs warrant greater moral concern" than individual harm by way of personal emissions and similar negative actions contributing to climate change (pg. 412). In order for emissions reduction, one of many climate change issues, to occur at a scale that has positive environmental effects government action will be needed. Overall, environmental reform is best supported and advanced by activism and movements. Frederick Buttel theorizes that the reasons for this are that environmental activism and movements fight back against countermovement groups and that they ensure responsibility in regards to environmental protection.

Government systems can both shape and constrain what public activists are able to do, particularly systems found in countries like the U.S and European Union. Constraints come from institutional aspects of the government systems that make it difficult to produce legislation and other prominent changes that fight against climate change issues. The progression of mobilization in some cases depends on activists to find ways to move past barriers found in these government systems. The general public has influence over certain outcomes. "...[L]atent civic behavior, attitudes towards society, and historical patterns of expectations for institutional performance can exert surprisingly important influence on political, and even economic outcomes(pg. 33). When looking at Californian policy, it was found that the influence of citizen activism leads to systematic choices that are favorable to the environment from influential and powerful members, like policy and community figureheads.

A 2023 review study published in One Earth stated that opinion polls show that most people perceive climate change as occurring now and close by. The study concluded that seeing climate change as more distant does not necessarily result in less climate action, and reducing psychological distancing does not reliably increase climate action.

=== Systems and actions in public activism ===
Erik Wright's theories of social transformation were used to analyze environmental movements and in part the actions that these movements took in their activism that connected to Wright's "transformational strategies". This includes "interstitial strategies", which are strategies that try to alter or challenge the current system, are seen in citizens actions like buying more efficient appliances and other environmentally-friendly focused consumer actions. "Ruptural strategies" "smash the current system through confrontation". Strategies like these connect to the practice in environmental movement to hold protests and resistance demonstrations. Lastly, "symbiotic strategies" are focused on collaboration through social reformation such as promoting and reforming policy to prioritize the climate's health as opposed to profit. Other types of strategies that citizen activists take are "awareness building, alliance building, and network foundation." "Conservation behavior", the public's willingness to life more environmentally-sustainable lifestyles, has been seen to become increasingly more popular both in developed and "developing democracies." In an examination of the BRIC countries, of which they are still considered developing, it is posited that if work being done by environmentalists in these countries is seen as not enough, citizens may take it upon themselves to "turn their efforts to lifestyle adjustments as an alternative form of contribution."

The United States' "citizen suit provision" is a type of system that is accessible for the use in public environmental activism. These are used in many major U.S environmental laws, are important to environmental enforcement, and deter noncompliance from agencies at fault as well as demonstrate public interest and demand. Another environmental system is "China's environmental complaint system". This system takes in citizen's reports of violations in regards to environmental issues and is used typically for the public to voice "concerns and frustrations with environmental problems and has been successful in promoting environmental awareness and engaging the public"(pg 330). The study suggested that "the role of public participation is greatly dependent on the broader governance [system] within which it is embedded, and that channeling environmental activism into [government] can significantly influence its effectiveness"(pg 326).

=== Obstacles ===
In this 2022 Pew survey, respondents from almost half the countries ranked climate change as being highest of five threats in the survey.

In a UNDP survey covering 77 countries, most respondents from top fossil fuel-producing countries favored a quick transition away from fossil fuels.

Public activism faces challenges due to differences in economic development as well as differences in government and law. There have been "signs of declining confidence and membership in environmental [organizations]" in the BRIC countries as well as "barriers to public involvement and social [mobilization] due to close monitoring and censorship, notably in China and Russia. Issues facing more long-term environmental discourse are feelings of unconcern and helplessness are cited as obstacles that public activist groups face in trying to promote change. In addition, mainstream environmental movements are "increasingly being challenged by environmental counter-movements"(pg 309). There are also many different goals and gaps between these types of movements, as well as barriers to producing an effective, influential message to inspire other to enact change. This prevents a solid, widespread message and specific goal from all environmental groups being produced.

=== Targeting of activists ===
The United States government through its domestic intelligence services targeted, as "domestic terrorists," environmental activists and climate change organizations, including by investigating them, questioning them, and placing them on national "watchlists" that makes it more difficult for them to board airplanes and that could instigate local law enforcement monitoring. Unknown actors also secretly hired professional hackers to launch phishing hacking attacks against climate activists who were organizing the #ExxonKnew campaign. On September 16, 2022, over fifty climate protesters were arrested and jailed in the U.K. for blocking roads, with many of them going through court hearings, and some being released on bail. Alice Reid, a spokesperson for the group Rebels in Prison Support, claims that many of these protestors are young adults with no connection to the judicial system before becoming activists. Since the late 2010s individual activists in Australia have been targeted by corporate strategic lawsuits against public participation and most states have increased penalties for business interference or trespassing as well as criminalised the use of specific devices used to attach protesters to infrastructure or equipment. In some situations courts have dismissed cases brought under the new laws or freed prisoners upon appeal.

== Activities ==
=== 2014 People's Climate March ===
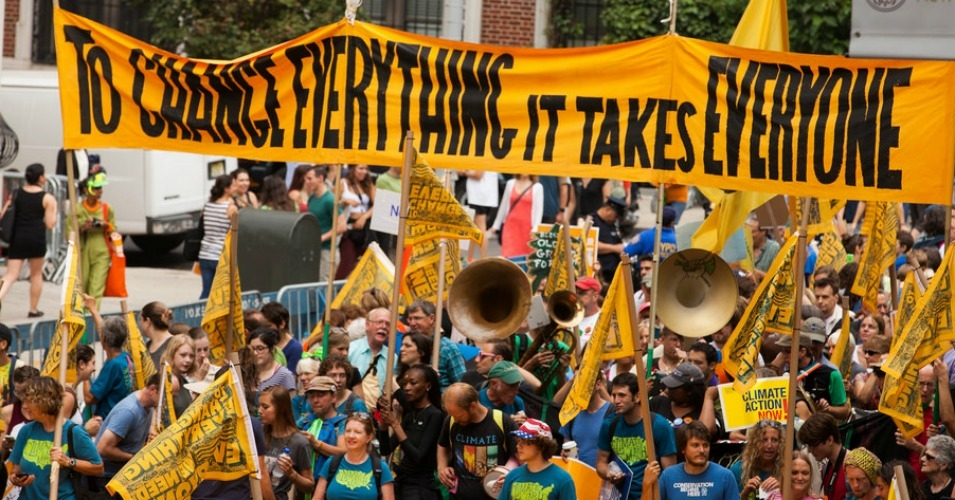
The People's Climate March 2014 brought together hundreds of thousands of people for strong action on climate change.

The climate movement convened its largest single event on 21 September 2014, when it mobilized 400,000 activists in New York during the People's Climate March (plus several thousand more in other cities), organized by the People's Climate Movement, to demand climate action from the global leaders gathered for the 2014 UN Climate Summit.

=== Institutional Climate Activism ===
There have been coalitions of institutional investors that have promulgated climate activism. These initiatives have sometimes included expansive group efforts, such as Climate Action 100+ - a coalition over 300 institutional investors (including some of the largest greenhouse emitters). Institutional activism is not uncommon, despite the common assumption that shareholder interests would be averse to such action. However, industry-wide efforts to mitigate climate risks is often in the interest of heavily diversified firms, as climate change can have a strong effect on the global economy.

=== Climate Mobilization ===
Since 2014, growing portions of the climate movement, especially in the United States have been organizing for an international economic response to climate change on the scale of the mobilization of the American home front during World War II, with the goal of rapidly slashing carbon emissions and transitioning to 100% clean energy faster than the free market is likely to allow. Throughout 2015 and 2016, The Climate Mobilization led grassroots campaigns in the U.S. for this scale of ambition, and in July 2016, activists succeeded in getting text adopted into the Democratic Party's national platform calling for WWII-scale climate mobilization. In August 2015, environmentalist Bill McKibben published an article in the New Republic rallying Americans to "declare war on climate change."

=== School strikes for climate ===
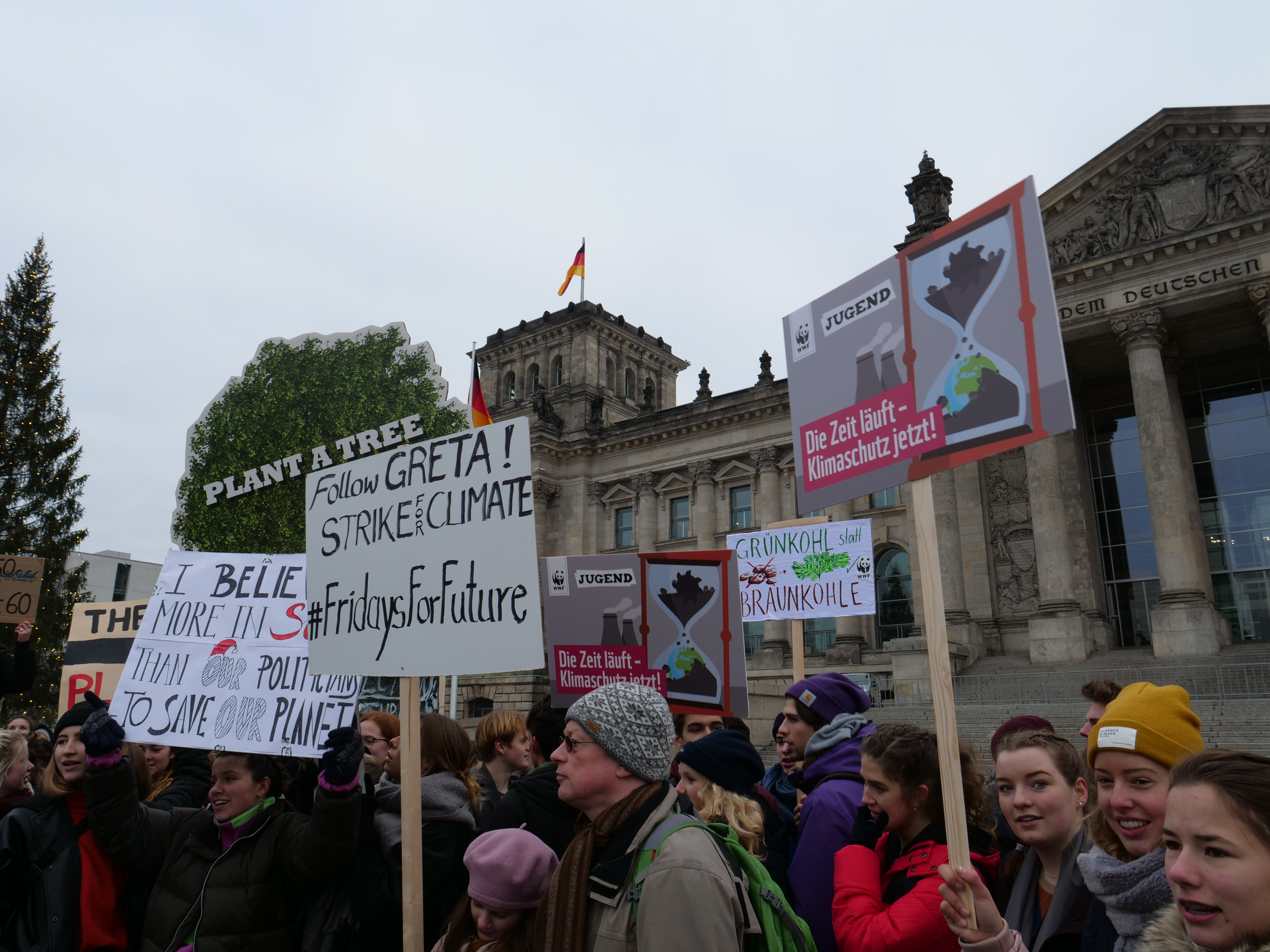
A school strike for climate in Berlin in 2018

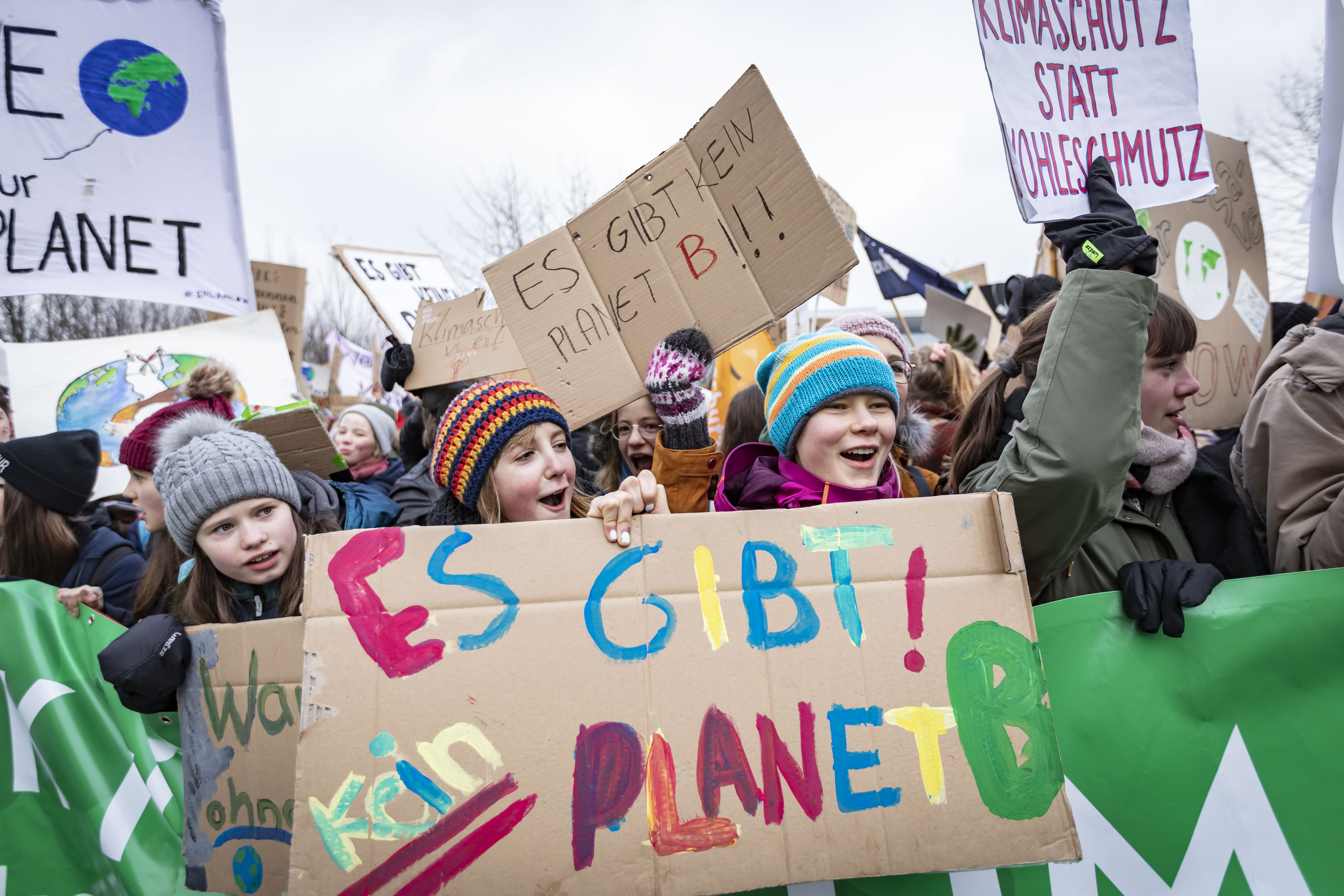
Children at a Fridays for Future protest in Germany, 2019

Fridays for Future (FFF), also known as the School Strike for Climate (Swedish: Skolstrejk för klimatet [ˈskûːlstrɛjk fœr klɪˈmɑ̌ːtɛt]), is an international movement of school students who skip Friday classes to participate in demonstrations to demand action from political leaders to prevent climate change and for the fossil fuel industry to transition to renewable energy. Publicity and widespread organising began after Swedish pupil Greta Thunberg staged a protest in August 2018 outside of the Swedish parliament, the Riksdag, holding a sign that read "Skolstrejk för klimatet" ("School strike for the climate").

A global strike on 15 March 2019 gathered more than one million strikers in 2,200 strikes organised in 125 countries. On 24 May 2019, in the second global strike, 1,600 protests across 150 countries drew hundreds of thousands of strikers. The May protests were timed to coincide with the 2019 European Parliament election.

The 2019 Global Week for Future was a series of 4,500 strikes across over 150 countries, focused around Friday 20 September and Friday 27 September. Likely the largest climate strikes in world history, the 20 September strikes gathered roughly 4 million protesters, many of them schoolchildren, including 1.4 million in Germany. On 27 September, an estimated two million people participated in demonstrations worldwide, including over one million protesters in Italy and several hundred thousand protesters in Canada.

=== Youth Climate Movement ===
Since the beginning of student activism, youth voices have often mirrored broader societal concerns, extending beyond the confines of campus-specific issues. Historically, student activists have not only brought critical popular interest concerns like environmental issues into public conversation but have also influenced the development and implementation of significant environmental policies. In the 1970's, millions of U.S. students participated in the world's first Earth Day organizing and hosting 'teach-ins'. This led to the emergence of key student groups like Pennsylvania, SLOP (Student League Opposing Pollution); Schenectady, New York, had YUK (Youth Uncovering Crud); and Cloquet, Minnesota, had SCARE (Students Concerned about a Ravaged Environment) to name a few. These student-led groups in addition to other coalition groups began to apply overwhelming pressure on the federal legislature. In 1970, the U.S. federal government created the Environmental Protection Agency, to develop and enforce laws and regulations; in that same year congress passed the Clean Air Act, aimed at reducing dense visible smog in many of the nation's cities and industrial centers.

Thenceforth, youth all over the world have been striking, advocating, and volunteering for climate solutions. Youth climate action groups such as SustainUS, Fridays for Future, the Sunrise Movement, PIRG, and Climate Cardinals have called on young people to hold leaders accountable, whether through attending conferences, striking from school and pressuring politicians to listen to scientists, or calling for greater green jobs and consolidating voting power.

In 2020 the United Nations Secretary General launched the global Youth Advisory Group on Climate Change, selecting seven members who meet to represent the changes youth are demanding globally. In 2025, the group was expanded to 14, with the third cohort beginning its two-year term on 12 August 2025.

Youth involvement in pro-climate action movements has increased significantly in the 21st century, and has intensified over the past few years. Youth climate activists have used social media platforms as a vehicle to engage and protest with the current environmental issue. After Greta Thunberg started the youth movement "Strikes for Climate" by protesting outside the Swedish Parliament in 2018, she documented her journey on Twitter, where she built a network to promote her cause and call people to action.

Younger generations are paying more attention to global events, particularly climate change. Research shows that climate change is of greater concern among younger people than older people. Over 70% of Americans aged 18 to 34 worry about global warming compared with 62% of those 35 to 54 and 56% who are 55 or older. Corner claims that across European countries, young people tend to have similar or higher levels of concern than adults and have a higher sense of risk perception. Younger generations are more likely to have learned through general education about climate change in their schooling, and to be aware of the negative effects that climate change has brought to the Earth. In addition, they also see climate change as a more serious global event that is relevant to themselves because they will be more impacted, and thus should take the lead on addressing climate change.

When the COVID-19 pandemic hit, most school strikes movements around the world continued to be held, but moved more onto social media platforms, resulting in lower participation rates. However, participation in youth climate movement on social media continued to rise. Social media provided an outlet for youth to share their concerns, generate knowledge, and be more politically active since they are not yet able to vote and face logistical limitations in face-to-face participation.

The research found that activists in their study created a sense of connection to other young people and other climate change activists. They usually post their activist identities on their social media account profile. (For example, @GretaThunberg, a young climate activist #climatechange#climatestrike #youthmovement). What they share in common is that they try to inspire others to do the same in their communities by showcasing themselves as climate activists with a strong voice. The strategy for younger activists is to situate themselves within a specific role to create a relevant identity to others and make connections with other people on the internet. Thus, regardless of which side the activists are going to support, they are utilizing their social media as a medium to communicate with others in a shared way. They are playing an important role focused on engaging a range of supporters worldwide to join in the youth climate movement.

The Youth Climate Movement (YouNGO) or International Youth Climate Movement (IYCM) refers to an international network of youth organisations that collectively aims to inspire, empower and mobilise a generational movement of young people to take positive action on climate change.

YOUNGO is the official children and youth Constituency of the UNFCCC, with members up to 35 years old. One of the main tasks of this group is to draft a Global Youth Position Statement to hand officials at the annual UNFCCC Conference of Parties.

=== 2019 Global Climate Strike ===
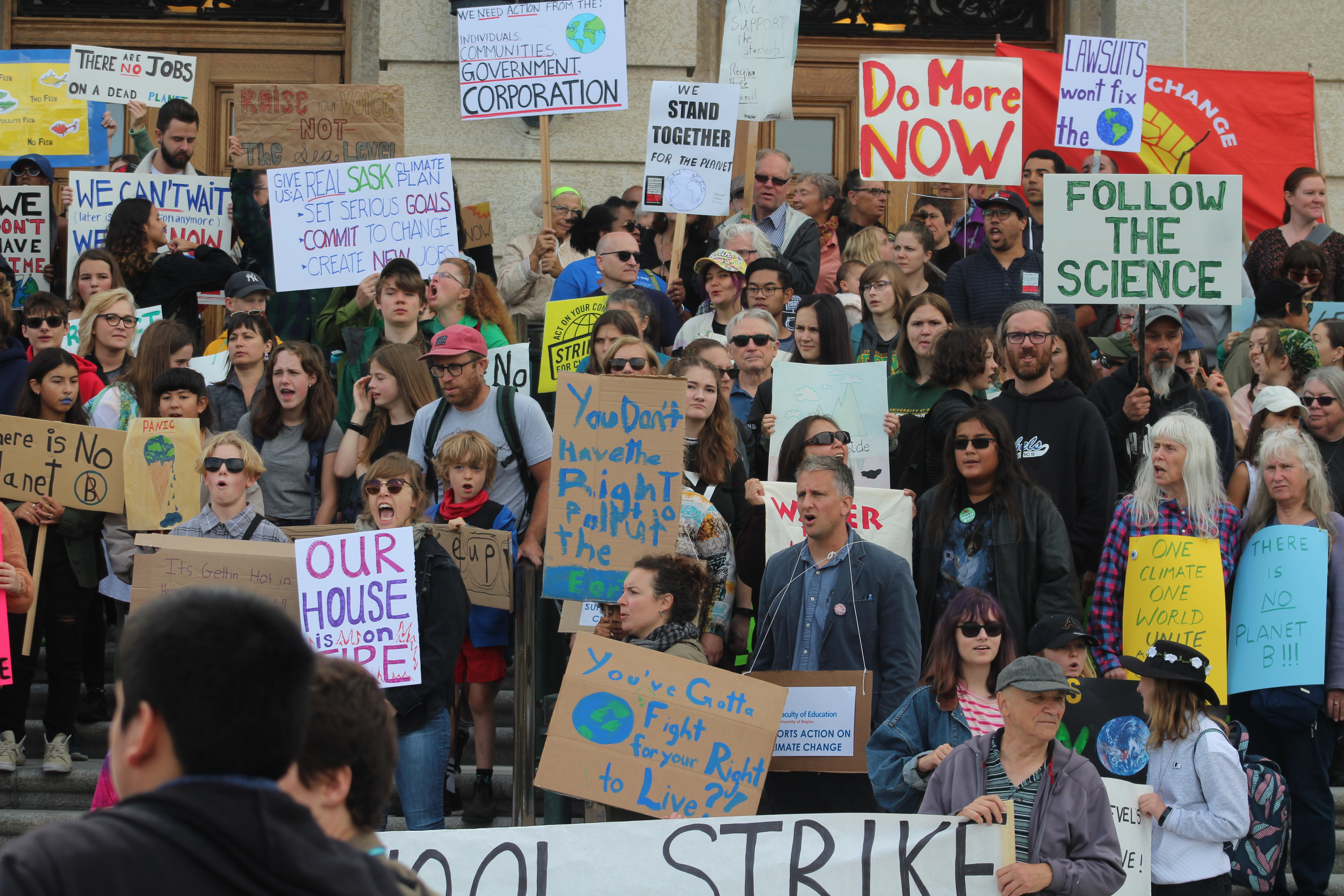
One of the September 2019 climate strikes

Protest attendee numbers from 20 to 27 September 2019, by country: 1,000,000+ 100,000+ 10,000+ 1,000+ 100+ Small protests, unclear numbers

The September 2019 climate strikes, also known as the Global Week for Future, were a series of international strikes and protests to demand action be taken to address climate change, which took place from 20 to 27 September 2019. The strikes' key dates were 20 September, which was three days before the United Nations Climate Summit, and 27 September. The protests took place across 4,500 locations in 150 countries. The event stemmed from the Fridays for Future school strike for climate movement, inspired by Swedish climate activist Greta Thunberg. The Guardian reported that roughly 6 million people participated in the events, whilst 350.org – a group that organised many of the protests – claim that 7.6 million people participated.

The 20 September protests were likely the largest climate strikes in world history. Organisers reported that over 4 million people participated in strikes worldwide, including 1.4 million participants in Germany. An estimated 300,000 protesters took part in Australian strikes, a further 300,000 people joined UK protests and protesters in New York – where Greta Thunberg delivered a speech – numbered roughly 250,000. More than 2,000 scientists in 40 countries pledged to support the strikes.

A second wave of protests took place on 27 September, in which an estimated 2 million people took part in over 2,400 protests. There were reported figures of one million protesters in Italy, and 170,000 people in New Zealand. In Montreal, where Greta Thunberg spoke, the Montreal school board cancelled classes for 114,000 of its students. An estimated 500,000 protesters, including several federal party leaders, joined the march in Montreal.

=== 2023 Climate Protests ===
In November 2023 around 70,000 people participated in a climate march in Amsterdam, Netherlands, 10 days before the elections in the country. This was the biggest climate march in the history of the Netherlands.

Many climate protests were scheduled for the 2023 United Nations Climate Change Conference including a climate march in London. The conference has created many protests, as the head of the conference is at the same time the head of the oil company ADNOC which according to one research "is planning the largest expansion of oil and gas production of any company in the world."

=== Summer of Heat on Wall Street (2024) ===
In May 2024, the Summer of Heat on Wall Street began a series of civil disobedience actions in Tribeca, New York City, mainly at the Citibank World Headquarters plaza. This was the first climate protest in history to hold an entire season of weekly civil disobedience protests targeting Wall Street's role in environmental degradation. Targets include bankers and insurers, specifically Citibank and Citigroup.

== See also ==
- Business action on climate change
- Climate action
- Effects of climate change
- Environmental movement
- Ecological movement
- Environmental racism
- List of environmental protests
- List of women climate scientists and activists
- Plant-based action plan
- 3.5% rule
