= Sagarika Sriram =

Indian climate activist

- Born: 2005 (age 20–21); Chennai, India
- Education: Jumeirah College, United Arab Emirates
- Occupation: climate activist
- Awards: 100 Women (BBC) (2023)

Sagarika Sriram (born 2005) is an Emirati climate activist. She is an advocate for environmental rights as a member of the UN Committee on the Rights of the Child's children's advisory committee. In 2023, Sriram was added to the BBC's 100 Women list.

== Biography ==
Sriram, who leads the climate movement from Dubai, UAE, originally hails from Chennai, India. At the age of 10, Sriram created the web portal Kids4abetterworld, which aims to educate kids worldwide and assist them in community sustainability projects, using her coding abilities. She supports this with environmental programmes that are offered both offline and online, showing kids how they can make a difference in climate change. Sriram was enrolled in the Johns Hopkins Centre for Talented Youth's (CTY) HTML coding and web design course. The project's ultimate outcome was realised in Kids For A Better World (K4BW). Soon after, she realised that she wanted to make K4BW something that could be accessed by people all over the world K4BW conducted a series of Sustainable Summer Workshops to raise schoolchildren's awareness of climate issues. Sriram and her peers taught participants about the dangers of global warming and how to mitigate them.

In 2023, she was included in the BBC 100 Women list.
