= Young Friends of the Earth =

Young Friends of the Earth Europe (YFoEE)
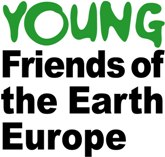
- YFoEE logo
- Established: 2007
- Type: Non-governmental organization
- Purpose: Environmentalism, Sustainability, Climate Justice
- Location: Brussels, Belgium
- Region served: Global
- Method: networking, awareness campaign, educational activities, direct action
- Members: 15 national member groups
- Key people: Sophie Manson
- Website: Young FoEE

Young Friends of the Earth Europe (YFoEE) is a grassroots network of young people and youth organisations working together on social and environmental justice issues. It works collectively on the local, national and European level, to inspire young people, organise actions and events and get attention in the media, in politics and among the general public on issues important to young people.

YFoEE is a part of Friends of the Earth, the world's largest international grassroots environmental network. It was established in 2007 by national youth groups affiliated to member groups of Friends of the Earth Europe. YFoEE is also part of the international Youth Climate Movement.

== Activities ==
In 2008, the YFoEE team took 2000 messages to the UNFCCC climate change negotiations in Poznan (COP 14), collected from nearly 20 countries in Europe, on young peoples demands to stop climate change, which were delivered to leaders at the UN climate talks.

In 2009, the ‘Act Now’ campaign was founded, led by the YFoEE Climate Team - a group of 40 young people from 15 different countries from across Europe who were trained to follow the international climate change negotiations. The group of youth delegates, who also included young delegates from South America and Asia, attended the UNFCCC talks in Copenhagen (COP 15) in December 2009. Within the Act Now project, Young Friends of the Earth Europe organized regional conferences in Germany, Ireland, Sweden and France with the aim to educate young Europeans about climate politics and motivate them to take action. Previously, the group also sent youth delegates to Bonn in 2008 and Bonn in 2009 (Seventh session of the AWG-KP and fifth session of the AWG-LCA).

In 2010, YFoEE hosted a parallel convergence to the COP16 UN Climate Talks in Cancún, Mexico, in Brussels, Belgium as an alternative forum to the International political negotiations and to build the regional European Youth Climate Movement.

== See also ==
- BUNDjugend (Young Friends of the Earth Germany)
- Nature and Youth (Young Friends of the Earth Norway)
- Friends of the Earth Europe
- Youth Climate Movement
- Friends of the Earth
