= Big Wind Carpenter =

Northern Arapaho and American environmental and indigenous activist

Micah "Big Wind" Carpenter-Lott
- Born: Great Falls, Montana
- Occupation: Environmental and indigenous activist

Micah "Big Wind" Carpenter-Lott is a Northern Arapaho and American environmental and indigenous activist. They are two-spirit. They are best known for their climate activism in Wyoming and their participation in COP25, COP26, COP27, COP28, COP29, and COP30.

== Biography ==
Carpenter was born in Great Falls, Montana to a Northern Arapaho mother and a Nakota, Ojibwe, and Aaniiih father. They were raised on the Wind River Indian Reservation in Wyoming. They grew up witnessing an economy founded in fossil fuels in Wyoming, and described fossil fuel extraction as "strategically" bypassing areas that non-Natives lived. They observed industrial runoffs of oil and gas extraction being poured into the reservation creek and undrinkable groundwater due to radiation.

At 13, they were found to have been drinking underage and ordered by a tribal judge to join the United National Indian Tribal Youth, which shaped their subsequent work. At age 15, they founded an organization called RezVote to promote voting among citizens on the reservation, and subsequently created a successor organization, RezAction, which they continued working on at least through 2012.

In 2015, they advocated for Medicaid expansion. In 2017, they participated in the Dakota Access Pipeline protests. They subsequently worked on policy work with the United Nations Permanent Forum on Indigenous Issues and worked with SustainUS. They also helped plan the first ever Wyoming statewide climate summit in 2022. They have faced arrest during their protests for environmental issues, including during a protest in Hubbard County, Minnesota.

They participated in COP25 as part of the SustainUS delegation, where they advocated for environmental protection plans in Wyoming, nationally, and internationally. They also participated in COP26.

They participated in COP27 as the Northern Arapaho delegate, where they emphasized the importance of financial damages and the role of indigenous groups in environmental protection and the carbon market. They commented about the danger for them in the fact that the host country was Egypt, which criminalizes homosexuality.

During COP27, they had their credentials revoked after interrupting U.S. President Joe Biden's speech with a "war cry" and a banner. Also at COP27, they heckled John Kerry at a speech promoting climate credits, accusing him of "promoting false solutions". They were then removed by security guards. However, Kerry scheduled a meeting with them the next day to discuss climate action in the united states.

They participated in COP28 as part of the Wisdom Keepers Group, where they found fossil fuel lobbyists were more predominant than before.

They participated in COP29, where they brought up the drought in Wyoming, and also participated in COP30.

They work as the tribal engagement coordinator at the Wyoming Outdoor Council, and have worked on co-stewardship between Wyoming and the Bureau of Land Management over the Red Desert and rooftop solar. They have emphasized the preservation of indigenous traditions such as Chokecherry patties, and have also discussed the risks of harm faced by environmental activists. They have advocated for tribal control of water within their reservations. They were named to the Grist 50 in 2025.

They are two-spirit and use they/them pronouns. They previously used he/him pronouns.
