= Friends of the Earth – France =

Non-profit environmental organization based in France

Friends of the Earth - France
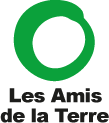
- Abbreviation: AdT - France
- Formation: 1969; 57 years ago, David Brower
- Type: NGO
- Purpose: Association for the protection of people and the environment
- Location: 2B rue Jules Ferry - 93100 Montreuil - FRANCE
- Official language: French
- Current President: Florent Compain
- General Delegate: Cynthia Sou
- Affiliations: Friends of the Earth - International
- Website: Amis de la Terre - France

Friends of the Earth – France is an association for the protection of people and the environment. It is one of 76 national groups around the world which make up the Friends of the Earth network of environmental organizations. The group is listed as an association under the French law of 1901 (Loi de 1901) and authorised to act for the protection of the environment in France by order of the Environment Minister. Friends of the Earth – France is independent of any economic, political and religious influences.

The association is a network of thirty local groups which are largely autonomous and work according to their local priorities. They are also involved in national and international campaigns owing to a shared commitment to social and environment justice.

== History ==
The Friends of the Earth was founded by David Brower in San Francisco in 1969 after he stepped down as chairman of the Sierra Club. He wished to form an association to investigate causes of damage to the environment and then to combat them. He founded a new organisation, Friends of the Earth, and the association gathered support from many famous names.

In France, Friends of the Earth registered as an association in Paris on the 11th of July 1970. The main founders were Edwin Matthews, an American lawyer living in Paris, and Alain Hervé, a poet and reporter whose initial idea was to see Friends of the Earth become a movement that aimed to improve public knowledge of nature. Members of the sponsorship committee included: Jean Dorst (naturalist, former director of the French Museum of Natural History), Pierre Fournier (novelist under the name of Pierre Gascar), anthropologist Claude Lévi-Strauss, biologist Konrad Lorenz, anthropologist Théodore Monod and biologist Jean Rostand.

Friends of the Earth were among the first organisations to push for environmental candidates in political elections, such as René Dumont who ran for president in 1974 as the first ecologist candidate and who later became honorary president of the association. Afterwards, the group also attracted activists such as Pierre Radanne (ex-director of the ADEME) and Dominique Voynet (Environment Planning Minister in 1997).

In 1983, Friends of the Earth decided to focus on their associational activities. Many of the activists then left the association to participate in the creation of the Greens (Les Verts, fr:Europe Écologie Les Verts), such as Yves Cochet (founder of the local group in Rennes). Later on more activists left to form the Génération Écologie, such as Brice Lalonde (Paris group) who went on to become Environment Minister in 1988.

The departure of several activists weakened the campaign resources, including the financial resources. Several teams, including those of Pierre Samuel and Guy Aznar, have since succeeded in maintaining and developing the national association for Friends of the Earth – France. The structure of the association has remained decentralised. Local groups have considerable autonomy, while keeping the desire to unite their strength in the national and global campaigns.

== Structure ==
Three entities shape the structure of the organisation Friends of the Earth:

The Federal Council (Le Conseil fédéral)includes 12 elected members, mainly from local groups. Its role is to ensure the correct application of guidelines adopted by the Federal Assembly (Assemblée fédérale), and to decide on major courses of action for the association.

New Federal Council elected in June 2012:

- Martine Laplante, President (Friends of the Earth Limousin)
- Christian Berdot, Vice President (Friends of the Earth Landes)
- Bénédicte Bonzi, Federal Secretary (Friends of the Earth Vaucluse)
- Gerard ERIPRET, Treasurer (Friends of the Earth Seine-et-Marne)

The Local groups; Friends of the Earth is a national federation of activists and volunteer members composed of 30 local active member groups across the country. Autonomous local groups act according to their local priorities and work towards an environmentally sustainable and socially equitable future at the local, national and international level. Each group is self-managing in terms of its campaigns, decision making structures and fundraising.

The Federal Secretariat (Le Secrétariat fédéral) is organised by a team of employees, volunteers and interns. The secretariat is responsible for implementing the guidelines adopted by the Federal Assembly and the Federal Council.

== Objectives ==
The principal aim of the Friends of the Earth is to act for the protection of people and the environment. This objective is specified through a Federal Charter (Charte fédérale) titled « La Charte des principes fondamentaux des Amis de la Terre France » which aims to create a world where:

- basic human needs of all are met, without compromising the ability of future generations to meet their own needs;
- access to, and sharing of, natural resources is equitable;
- all citizens participate in shaping a society based on democratic principles.

== Campaigns ==
The group's main sphere of activity are in ecological transition; agriculture, biodiversity and the city; economic justice; energy and mining, and risks and technologies. Themes of campaigns are:

=== Ecological transition ===
- Method of production and sustainable consumption

This campaign was launched in 2011 around the program “One Planet Only” (“Une seule planète”) with the Research and Information Centre for Development (CRID - Centre de Recherche et d’Information pour le Développement) to raise awareness on the stakes of a sustainable management of natural resources incorporating the limits defined by the ecological space. Friends of the Earth has actively participated in this program.

As part of this thematic, the report “Overconsumption, a threat to water” (Surconsommation, une menace sur l'eau) was done in 2011 : it highlights the water footprint of consumption, that is to say the volume of water needed for the production of goods that people consume (for example a T-shirt requires 2,700 litres of water).

Another report “Europe, dependent on the lands of others” (L'Europe, dépendante des terres des autres) focuses on the use of lands. The report shows, for the first time, that 60% of the land used to supply the European demand for agricultural and forestry products are located outside the continent. These lands are not only used for food, meat production or fibres needed for the textile sector, but also for the growing demand for biofuels.

- Planned obsolescence

With the report “Planned Obsolescence” (L'obsolescence programmée) issued in 2010, Friends of the Earth have focused on the reduction of the amount of waste generated by electrical and electronic equipment. With regard to producers, the association argues the need to sell products which are more robust, repairable, and durable, and fights for an extension of the warranty period from 2 to 10 years. With regard to consumers, the association wants to give people a sense of responsibility by showing a behind the scenes view of the 21st century consumer society. Friends of the Earth have also taken part in the working group of French Environment and Energy Management Agency (ADEME - Agence de l'Environnement et de la Maîtrise de l'Energie) on the lifetime of products.

- Nitrogen dioxide levels: Following a complaint filed by Friends of the Earth in 2021, France's Conseil d'État fined the state 10 million euros ($11.9 million) for failing to improve air quality in several areas of the country to be in line with European Union standards.

=== Energy and climate ===
- Nuclear power phase-out: Friends of the Earth have been long-time campaigners against nuclear power. At the first international meeting of the different groups in Rambouillet (near Paris), a moratorium was demanded on the operation of nuclear power plants. Friends of the Earth went by boat to the Moruroa atoll to prevent nuclear testing, atmospheric at that time.

The association asserts that since 1957 the nuclear power industry has benefitted from a quasi-exemption of civil responsibility by the manufacturers and the operators, with no insurance company being willing to accept the risks. Demands concerning nuclear power are the immediate closure of nuclear power plants, the withdrawal of nuclear power in France within one or two quinquennats (five-year term served by each President of France), stopping any use of depleted uranium in weapons and consumer goods or equipment and a real logic in public service and not financial speculation on electricity.

- Tar sands: in the context of the depletion of conventional oil reserves, since 2001 Friends of the Earth have been denouncing companies that invest more and more in unconventional hydrocarbon sources, such as tar sands. Friends of the Earth mainly denounced the French company Total S.A., whose principal operations are located in the province of Alberta in Canada. Total is also interested in the exploitation of large oilfields in Madagascar, about which Friends of the Earth issued a report “Madagascar: a new Eldorado for mining and oil companies” (Madagascar: nouvel eldorado des compagnies minières et pétrolières) in November 2012.
- Shale gas has grown considerably during the last decade in the United States and Canada. In France, companies such as Schuepbach Energy, GDF Suez, Total and Devon Energy obtained three exploration permits in March 2010 (permits so-called "Montelimar", "Nant" and "Villeneuve de Berg") for a total area of 9672 km2, in the departments of Ardèche, Drôme, Lozère, Hérault, Gard and Vaucluse. Other permits are currently under investigation in Provence and Picardy. Friends of the Earth assert that shale gas is often presented by the industry as part of the natural gas reserves, which are qualified as “clean fossil fuels”. However, even the Environmental Protection Agency (EPA) in the United States or the Directorate General for Energy and Raw Materials (DGEMP - Direction Générale de l'Energie et des Matières Premières, part of the French Ministry of Ecology, Sustainable Development and Energy, has reported significant environmental impacts in its “Annual Report on the oil and gas industry in 2009”.

=== Economic justice ===
Friends of the Earth campaigns for financial actors take into account their impacts on the environment and people.

- International financial institutions: Friends of the Earth have run an international campaign “Free us from fossil fuels!” against financial support for fossil energy projects from the World Bank. The association campaigns for all French funding in fossil energy be stopped, and for French activities be refocused to support renewable energy and efficient energy.

Friends of the Earth have also continued their campaign against the European Investment Bank (EIB), the public bank of the European Union, which is a stakeholder in several mining projects in Africa. Following this, financing was halted of the Mopani Copper Mine project, where the EIB announced that it would no longer fund the projects of the company Glencore AG until such time as the results of an internal inquiry invalidate serious charges brought against the Swiss multinational. The French TV channel France 5 broadcast a documentary on the case “Zambia: who benefits from the copper?” (Zambie: à qui profite le cuivre?).

- Private banks: In a campaign concerning private banks and COFACE, Friends of the Earth questioned investments by the banks in nuclear power and their indirect contributions to the climate change. The actions carried out were the distribution of a parodical newspaper “Nuclear financial times” in front of the OECD headquarters in Paris; the campaign “Own the banks!” (“À nous les banques!”) in partnership with the ATTAC organisation, in which the association questions the ten major French banks on order to assess their social, environmental and economic impacts; the publication of the report “Banks under citizen pressure: time to give explanations” (Les banques sous pression citoyenne: l'heure de rendre des comptes).
- Corporate social and environmental responsibility: Friends of the Earth claim that the CSR voluntary approach has failed, and campaign for restrictive legal approach concerning the social and environmental impact of multinational corporations, particularly in the Global South where they are often present and very active. The group acts through the CRAD40 campaign and the Pinocchio Prizes.

CRAD40: Friends of the Earth led a campaign “Let's drop the masks of Crad 40” (Faisons tomber les masques du Crad 40) to demand a law to make corporate parent companies legally responsible for the activities of their subsidiaries abroad. This campaign aims to get a petition signed and to call on French deputies to strengthen the legal framework of multinational companies.

Pinocchio prizes: from 2008 to 2013, the Pinocchio prizes for sustainable development aimed to illustrate and denounce the negative impact of some French companies, in total contradiction with the concept of sustainable development they extensively used.

== “La Baleine” (The Whale) ==
La Baleine was the newspaper of the association. It delivered analyses of the association about environmental and social issues, and aimed to inform about the activities of the association and their allies at local, national and international levels.

== Allies ==
Various campaigns are carried out in partnership with several organisations including: CRID (Centre de recherche et d’information pour le développement - Research and Information Centre for Development), Climate Action Network, Réseau Semences paysannes (A network of associations for the protection of cultivation biodiversity), Réseau Sortir du Nucléaire (association for nuclear phase-out), Combat Monsanto (a group fighting genetic modification in agriculture) and Nature & Progrès (a group engaged in agro-ecology).

== See also ==
- Friends of the Earth Europe
- Friends of the Earth International

== Bibliography ==
- Wapner P. 1996, Environmental Activism and World Civic Politics, SUNY Press, 238p.
- Duncan McLaren, 1992, Friends of the Earth, Planning Practice & Research, Vol. 7, Iss. 3, 43-47p,
- Brian Doherty, 2006, Friends of the Earth International: Negotiating a transnational identity, Environmental Politics, Vol. 15, Iss. 5.
- Dalton, Russell J., 1994, The green rainbow: Environmental groups in Western Europe, Yale University Press(New Haven, 305 p.
- Arts, B., 1998, The political influence of global NGOs: case studies on the climate and biodiversity conventions, Jan van Arkel (International Books), 1998. 350 pp.
