= UK Youth Climate Coalition =

Youth climate empowerment organization

- Abbreviation: UKYCC
- Formation: June 2008
- Type: Non-profit company limited by guarantee
- Purpose: Youth representation
- Location: UK-wide
- Region served: United Kingdom
- Official language: English
- Key people: Casper ter Kuile and Emma Biermann, Co-Founders
- Affiliations: ActionAid, Amnesty International, British Youth Council, Diana Awards, Envision, Friends of the Earth, Liberal Youth, LJY Netzer, Made in Europe, Medsin, National Union of Students, Otesha Project, Oxfam, People & Planet, RSPB, Scottish Youth Parliament, Stop Climate Chaos, Unicef, The Woodcraft Folk, Young Scot
- Website: https://www.ukycc.com/

The UK Youth Climate Coalition (UKYCC) is a non-profit youth organisation in the United Kingdom. It is part of The Climate Coalition in the UK

Formed in 2008, the mission of the organisation is to mobilise and empower young people to take positive action for global climate justice. To achieve this, the UKYCC organises a series of projects, campaigns and events each year, including sending youth delegations to the United Nations Climate Negotiations.

The organisation is supported by a coalition of non-governmental organisations.

== Organisation ==
=== Formation ===
In June 2008, the United Kingdom ambassadors to the World Wide Fund for Nature's Voyage for the Future programme, Emma Biermann and Casper ter Kuile, returned from the Arctic to found the UK Youth Climate Coalition (UKYCC) based on similar organisations such as the Australian Youth Climate Coalition and the Energy Action Coalition in the United States.

By bringing together several youth organisations and a coalition of NGOs, the co-founders intended to unite the work of their partners. Following this, the co-founders formed a coordinating team who worked on several projects, campaigns and events over the duration of the next year.

=== Governance and structure ===
The UK Youth Climate Coalition (UKYCC) is run by a team of young volunteers between the ages of 18 and 29. The organisation is a registered private company limited by guarantee, with no share capital, which means it is run for non-profit purposes.

The organisation is split into several working groups

- Systems Change - This group was developed out of the "Gas" working group, which focused on campaigning against the use and development of natural gas resources in the UK.
- COP - This group works internationally on climate justice issues. They spend the year training and engaging with a team of delegates at the yearly UNFCCC COP and Intersessionals.
- Community - This group aims to tackle climate change at a local level. They focus on capacity-building activities for communities, as well as local activism.
- Youth Strike - This group works to help support the UK Youth Strike 4 Climate movement.
- LCOY - The group in charge of organising the UK's first Local Conference of Youth. These are conferences organised by YOUNGO (the youth wing of the UNFCCC) to empower youth climate activism.

These working groups are further supported by a Communications working group and an Operations working group which deal with key day-to-day aspects of the organisation. There is also a board of trustees who support organisers. The UKYCC is further supported by a coalition and works with several NGOs.

Internationally, the coalition affiliates with the Youth Climate Movement, with sister organisations in America, Australia, Canada, China and India. The UKYCC has also previously formed a partnership with the African Youth Initiative on Climate Change - Kenyan Chapter, with whom they share resources, experience and training.

=== Funding ===
The UKYCC advertises that its core funding comes mainly from donations from its supporters. Projects have previously been funded by grants, e.g., from the Youth Funding Network, and from in-kind support, e.g., Seventeen Events provided pro-bono support to the volunteers to ensure their Powershift event was sustainable.

== Activities ==
=== 2008 ===
In 2008, the UK Youth Climate Coalition undertook several activities. Some of their projects included:

- Participating in the National Climate March organised by the Campaign against Climate Change, with a campaign called "Our time is now" to raise awareness of climate change amongst young people.
- Organising a youth delegation to the 2008 United Nations Climate Change Conference in partnership with the Otesha Project. At the event, the delegation coordinated the 'Call Gordon' project, a viral telephone campaign asking then Prime Minister Gordon Brown to pursue a tougher agreement on climate change at the talks.
- Supporting the Green Finger Project, an online viral campaign that aims to show how climate change affects everyone. The project was initially the idea of Step it Up 2007, founded by Bill McKibben who went on to establish 350.org.

=== 2009 ===
Working with the International Youth Movement, in particular, the European Youth Climate Movement to contribute to the "How old will you be in 2050?" campaign, launched at the United Nations Climate negotiations taking place in Bonn, Germany.

Organising the Power Shift event in London. This event was designed to provide training and support to young people to work within their local communities.

Chairing a question-and-answer debate between a panel of government ministers and 80 young people. The panel included former Prime Minister Gordon Brown, Former Secretary of State for Energy and Climate Change Ed Miliband and Former Minister of State, Foreign & Commonwealth Office Baroness Glenys Kinnock.

Participating in the Wave March, organised by coalition partner Stop Climate Chaos. It is estimated that between 40,000 and 50,000 individuals attended the march in London, in addition to over 7,000 participants in Glasgow.

Participating in the 2009 United Nations Climate Change Conference. in Copenhagen. Darran Martin, one of the youth delegates, was reported to have cycled from the UK to the event. The delegation recorded a series of documentaries around the conference.

Organising a Day of Action as the UK Delivery partner for the Global Campaign for Climate Action, also recognised as "TckTckTck", including a flash dance outside the Houses of Parliament and projecting an image onto the House of Commons, with the slogan, "the World wants a real deal".

=== 2010 ===
Participating in the UK Youth Parliament with coalition partners Oxfam, Plan UK and UNICEF.

Participating in the Department for Energy and Climate Change Youth Advisory Panel with partners People & Planet and Plan UK.

Launching a viral video campaign called "Shake your money maker" to raise awareness of ethical banking amongst its supporters. The campaign ran with the slogan, "It might not come with a free popcorn machine, but an ethical bank account will sow the seeds for a cleaner, brighter future.".

Supporting the British Youth Council Manifesto and the Vote Global campaign during the General Elections.

Launching the "Adopt an MP" project.

=== 2011 ===
Providing training to enable young Europeans to organise Power Shift conferences. Launching the "Push Europe" campaign.

Participating in climate negotiations in Durban, South Africa.

=== 2012 ===
Launching the "Youth for Green Jobs" campaign.

Participating in COP18 in Qatar.

=== 2013 ===
In response to Education Secretary Michael Gove's proposal to remove climate change from the Geography national curriculum for under 14s, the UK Youth Climate Coalition set up a petition calling for a policy change. As a result of the 70,000 signatures, this received the policy was dropped.

The UK Youth Climate Coalition delegation to COP19 in Warsaw walked out a day early due to frustration at the lack of progress.

=== 2014 ===
Participating in COP20 in Lima, Peru.

Participating in the "Lima in Brussels" conference.

=== 2015 ===
Participating in COP21 in Paris. This included running workshops, joining human chain protests and in D12 (day of "red lines") actions.

=== 2016 ===
The abolition of the Department of Energy and Climate Change by Theresa May in 2016 led to direct actions around Westminster, as well as an email and letter campaign.

Participating in COP22 in Marrakech.

=== 2017 ===
Organising a Roundtable of youth organisations at the Department for Business, Energy and Industrial Strategy.

Engaging in actions with the Coal Action Network in front of BEIS, highlighting coal air pollution and public opposition.

Participating in COP23 in Bonn, Germany and holding a Gas side event.

=== 2018 ===
Working with Friends of the Earth on the "climate serious" campaign.

Launching the Gas Campaign, which focused on opposing hydraulic fracking in the UK.

Participating in COP24 in Poland. This included work with YOUNGO (the youth constituency at the UNFCCC), working on climate justice campaigns, and highlighting gender discussions and vested interests within COP.

=== 2019 ===
Participating in COP25 in Madrid.

=== 2020 ===
Preparing for COP26. This, and other work, was delayed due to COVID-19 restrictions.

=== 2021 ===
Participating in COP26 in Glasgow, Scotland.

=== 2022 ===
Participating in COP27 in Sharm-el Sheikh, Egypt.

=== 2023 ===
Creating a podcast called From the Ground Up. The first episodes were a series of interviews covering activism in Brazil and Malawi, disability justice and young people at COP.

== See also ==
The Climate Coalition
