= Wyoming Outdoor Council =

American conservation organization

- Formation: 1967; 59 years ago
- Founder: Tom Bell
- Founded at: Wyoming
- Type: Nonprofit
- Tax ID no.: 83-0259411
- Legal status: 501(c)(3)
- Headquarters: Lander, Wyoming
- Board Chair: Paul Howard
- Executive Director: Lisa Mcgee
- Board of directors: Paul Howard; Tom Christiansen; Larry Wolfe; Carol Bilbrough; Caroline Byrd; Darren Calhoun; Laramie Cummings; Sabrina King; George Mcclelland; Chris Pfister; Day Scott; Sean Stauth; Orville St. Clair
- Key people: Big Wind Carpenter, tribal engagement coordinator
- Website: https://wyomingoutdoorcouncil.org/

The Wyoming Outdoor Council is the oldest independent, membership-based conservation organization in Wyoming, United States. Wyoming native Tom Bell founded the group in 1967, along with Carrol R. Noble, Margaret E. “Mardy” Murie, Dr. Harold McCracken, Ann Lindahl and others. The group was originally called the Wyoming Outdoor Coordinating Council.

The Outdoor Council is a non-profit environmental advocacy organization with roughly 1,400 members, and offices in Lander and Laramie, Wyoming. The group's slogan is “Working to protect public lands and wildlife since 1967”.

The Wyoming Outdoor Council's stated mission since 2008 is to “protect Wyoming’s environment and quality of life for future generations.” In December 2008, the Outdoor Council's board of directors adopted a new strategic plan, which puts an emphasis on making sure energy development is undertaken in Wyoming with the “best available technology” and with minimum environmental impact.

The new plan also focuses on ensuring good stewardship for Wyoming's 30 million acres (120,000 km^{2}) of federal public lands, with a particular emphasis on protecting the state's landscapes, as identified by the council. These landscapes, which the group calls Wyoming's “heritage landscapes”, are all on public lands, and they have “significant environmental, historic, cultural, or social values”, according to the Wyoming Outdoor Council. Because of this, the group believes energy development should be off-limits in these heritage landscapes (see list of heritage landscapes below).

== Wyoming’s heritage landscapes ==
The Wyoming Outdoor Council has identified the following areas as Wyoming's heritage landscapes:

- All national forests in Wyoming
- National parks, national monuments, and national wildlife refuges
- Bureau of Land Management areas of critical environmental concern
- The Wyoming Range
- The Wind River Front
- Jack Morrow Hills
- Adobe Town
- Fortification Creek
- Beartooth Front
- Shirley Basin
- Citizens’ proposed wilderness areas on BLM lands

== Conserving Wyoming’s endemic species ==
The Wyoming Outdoor Council also works to preserve wildlife whose home ranges are located primarily in Wyoming. These animals are referred to by the group as Wyoming's endemic species, and they include the Wyoming toad, three subspecies of pika, white-tailed prairie dog, the dwarf shrew, the Uinta ground squirrel, the Uinta chipmunk and the Wyoming pocket gopher.

== Tom Bell, founder ==
Tom Bell, founder of the Wyoming Outdoor Council, grew up on a ranch outside Lander during the Great Depression. He was born on April 12, 1924, descended from Civil War soldier Edward Alton, who moved to Milford, Wyoming, in 1878.

Bell is a decorated World War II veteran, who flew with the 15th of the US Army's Air Forces on bombing missions throughout central and southern Europe. He successfully completed 32 combat sorties and earned the rank of 1st Lieutenant with the 455 Bombardment Group.

He was awarded the Silver Star for gallantry in action on 2 May 1944. On May 10, 1944, Lieutenant Bell was bombardier of a B-24 on a mission to bomb an enemy aircraft factory in Austria, when he was severely wounded by a burst of flak, causing him to lose his right eye and suffer shock and loss of blood.

When he returned home he said he found sanctuary in Wyoming's wide-open spaces. Bell attended the University of Wyoming where he earned a bachelor's and then a master's degree in wildlife conservation and game management. His course of study emphasized ecology and zoology.

Bell said he founded the Wyoming Outdoor Council because, by the mid-1960s, he could no longer ignore the threats facing his “beloved homeland”. His vision, he said, was to bring together various organizations in the state to speak as one voice on conservation issues.

“The first meeting was held in Casper,” Bell said. “I remember a sense of excitement. Maybe we could all pull together to work on some of these issues and get something accomplished. And we did.”

He resigned as director of the Wyoming Outdoor Council in the early 1970s to found the High Country News a paper that started as a small local camping magazine that he built into an award-winning national news journal on Western environmental issues.

Although he resigned as director of the Wyoming Outdoor Council, he later returned as a board member, and today continues to serve as a board member emeritus. Bell was featured in the 2006 documentary A Land Out of Time which describes the effects of energy development on the western landscape and the people that live there.

Bell has won many awards for his conservation work, including the National Wildlife Federation's Jay N. “Ding” Darling Award, for Conservationist of the Year in 2002. The award was established “to honor individuals who have made exceptional lifetime contributions to the cause of conservation”, according to the National Wildlife Federation. Previous recipients of the award include President Jimmy Carter, oceanographer Sylvia Earle and U.S. Sen. John Chafee.

Bell also received the Greater Yellowstone Coalition's Sargent Award for Lifetime Achievement in Conservation in 2007, and the Wyoming Citizen of the Century from the University of Wyoming's American Heritage Center in 2000

== The early days ==
The Wyoming Outdoor Council's early work in the late 1960s and early 1970s included public opposition to two major plans — one was to dam the Upper Green River near Pinedale, and the other to clear-cut large sections of the Bridger-Teton National Forest and Shoshone National Forest near Dubois. Both proposals were ultimately quashed. The group also fought to eliminate illegal and/or excessive fencing on public lands, in order to allow for freer movement of wildlife.

The Wyoming Outdoor Council also strenuously opposed and campaigned against the so-called Wagon Wheel project — a federal proposal to explode nuclear bombs underground in the Upper Green River Valley to release natural gas that was trapped in the rocks. Regional residents protested the project vigorously, and the plan was ultimately abandoned.

The Wyoming Outdoor Council also laid the groundwork — through surveys and catalogs — for future designations of wilderness areas in the state, including those areas eventually identified in the Wyoming Wilderness Act of 1984 (see “The 1980s and 1990s” below).

In 1975, the Council joined with the Sierra Club to create a “citizen’s lobby” that would have a presence in the state capital, Cheyenne, during Wyoming's legislative session. That year the citizen's lobby helped secure the passage of the Industrial Development, Information and Siting Act, which strengthened the state's clean air and water regulations and bolstered its regulatory power.

The Wyoming Outdoor Council, through Tom Bell's advocacy in the 1960s, helped lay the groundwork for this Industrial Siting Bill.

The group also advocated for the Wyoming Environmental Quality Act, which passed in 1973, and which created the Wyoming Environmental Quality Council, the state's environmental rulemaking body.

== The 1980s and 1990s ==
The Wyoming Wilderness Act, passed by the U.S. Congress in October 1984, was arguably the biggest victory for Wyoming conservationists in the 1980s. To this day, the bill protects nearly 1 million acres (4,000 km^{2}), more than 1,500 square miles (3,900 km^{2}), of wilderness in the state.

The Wyoming Wilderness Association, once an affiliate of the Wyoming Outdoor Council, led the grassroots effort to build broad-based local support to help ensure passage of the measure. Wyoming's congressional delegation — Senators Alan Simpson and Malcolm Wallop and then-Representative Dick Cheney — used that overwhelming public support to win approval in Congress. Cheney, the former vice president, called it one of his "proudest achievements".

In the early 1990s, the Wyoming Outdoor Council challenged the validity of the Pathfinder Mine's bond for uranium pit reclamation in southern Wyoming. The Council sued, and the state ultimately supported the council's case. The Wyoming Outdoor Council won the lawsuit, ensuring the company would properly fund the environmental reclamation of the mine.

The Outdoor Council also fought against legislation in the early 1990s that would have created a site in central Wyoming for storing America's radioactive waste, called the Monitored Retrievable Storage project. The Wyoming Outdoor Council mounted a statewide campaign against the initiative, and in 1992 helped convince Governor Mike Sullivan to veto the bill.

The Wyoming Outdoor Council also played critical roles in protecting the Shoshone National Forest from oil and gas development and in stopping the proposed Noranda gold mine on the border of Yellowstone National Park in the name of safeguarding the environment.

== The 21st century ==
Wyoming's latest energy boom started in the late 1990s and exploded in the early 21st century. In response, the Wyoming Outdoor Council has shifted much of its focus toward watchdogging the unprecedented, fast-paced development of natural gas fields, coal-bed methane operations, utility-scale wind farms, a proposed coal-to-liquids plant and four proposed new coal-fired power plants in the state.

“The boom that began in the 1990s now influences all aspects of our work to protect Wyoming’s public lands and wildlife, as basin after basin fills with drill rigs,” the group wrote in its Fall 2007 newsletter.

The Wyoming Outdoor Council's most recent work has included an effort to bring national attention to Wyoming's Red Desert, which, the group argues, contains extremely rare, National Park-worthy sites and landscapes that deserve protection.

The group has also worked to raise awareness of the state's Upper Green River Valley, where high levels of air pollution caused by energy development have led Wyoming to recommend the Environmental Protection Agency designate the area “nonattainment” for national ambient air quality standards for ground-level ozone levels.

The Outdoor Council has also worked on issues related to massive water production and documented contamination resulting from coal-bed methane development in northeast Wyoming's Powder River Basin.

The Wyoming Outdoor Council was also part of a broad coalition that worked to ensure passage of the Wyoming Range Legacy Act, a bill modeled after legislation that Wyoming Republican Senator Craig Thomas had intended to introduce before his death, and which was later introduced by his successor, John Barrasso. The legislation safeguards the Wyoming Range in western Wyoming from future oil and gas leases while creating a mechanism for the buy-back and retiring of existing oil and gas leases.

The Wyoming Range Legacy Act passed as part of the Omnibus Public Lands Management Act of 2009 and was signed into law by President Barack Obama on March 30, 2009.

== Original Board of Directors, Wyoming Outdoor Coordinating Council ==
- Tom Bell — Lander
- Margaret E. “Mardy” Murie' — Jackson, The Wilderness Society
- Ann Lindahl — Laramie, League of Women Voters
- Dr. Oliver Scott — Casper, Audubon Society
- Carrol R. Noble — Cora, National Wildlife Federation
- Clayton Trosper — Cheyenne, Isaak Walton League of America
- Dr. Harold McCracken — Cody, director of the Whitney Gallery of Western Art
- Burton Marston — Laramie, Isaak Walton League of America
- Charles Piersal — Casper, Isaak Walton League of America
- Roger Budrow — Lander, publisher of the Wyoming State Journal
- Bruce Ward — Casper, Casper Credit Bureau, and outdoors photographer
- L.W. Bill Isaacs — Pinedale, Wyoming Wildlife Federation
- Ralph Hallock — Casper, Isaak Walton League of America
- Les Shoemaker' — Dubois, dude rancher and outfitter
- Olin Atwood — Lander, Wyoming Rockhounds
