= BUNDjugend =

Youth organisation of the Bund für Umwelt und Naturschutz Deutschland

BUNDjugend (Young Friends of the Earth Germany)
- Founded: 1984
- Type: Non-governmental organization
- Purpose: Environmentalism, Sustainability, Youth
- Headquarters: Kaiserin-Augusta-Allee 5, 10553 Berlin, Germany
- Region served: Germany
- Method: awareness building, direct action, Education for Sustainable Development
- Members: 85,000 (2015)
- Website: https://www.bundjugend.de/

BUNDjugend (Young Friends of the Earth Germany) is the youth organisation of the Bund für Umwelt und Naturschutz Deutschland (BUND). As an environmental youth organization BUNDjugend is fighting for the protection of nature and environment. BUNDjugend was founded in 1984 and is divided into different state organizations. All members of the BUND under the age of 27 are automatically members of BUNDjugend without extra membership fees. At the moment there are approximately 43,000 active members.

== Activities and topics ==
Each year BUNDjugend organizes different activities and projects on topics of nature and environmental protection, aimed at children, adolescents and young adults. In the state organizations the focus is mainly on offering various holidays, camps and seminars. Furthermore, there are also several local children's and youth groups.

Current topics are nuclear power, climate change, genetic engineering, renewable energy, sustainable lifestyle and sustainable consumption.

== Organization and structure ==
The federal organization has its office in Berlin. The voluntary members of the board (Bundesjugendleitung) are elected for two years on the assembly of delegates that takes place once a year. Every state organization can send five delegates. The state organizations have a similar structure with own members of the board (Landesjugendleitung).

BUNDjugend sends representatives to the BUND on state and federal level. It is also a member of ATTAC and is active in the international grassroots network Young Friends of the Earth Europe which is part of Friends of the Earth.
