= Canadian Youth Climate Coalition =

Coalition of youth organisations

- Abbreviation: CYCC
- Formation: September 2006; 20 years ago
- Purpose: Youth representation
- Region served: Canada
- Official language: English
- Main organ: Coalition
- Affiliations: BYTE, Canadian Auto Workers Youth Network (CAWYN), Canadian Federation of Students, Canadian Labour Congress, Check Your Head, Sierra Youth Coalition (SYC), TakingITGlobal
- Website: OurClimate.ca

The Canadian Youth Climate Coalition (CYCC) is a nonprofit youth organization in Canada. The coalition consists of various youth organizations, which includes the Canadian Federation of Students, the Canadian Labour Congress, Sierra Youth Coalition, and others. The charity aims to prioritize climate change as a societal issue. Internationally, the coalition is part of the Global Youth Climate Movement.

== History ==
In September 2006, 48 youth organizations from across Canada met to discuss climate change and formed the Canadian Youth Climate Coalition. The coalition acts as a pressure group, to encourage politicians to act on the issue of climate change. Two months after its foundation, all Members of Parliament from the New Democratic Party signed onto the Canadian Youth Climate Coalition Declaration, which is a petition to the Canadian government to act on climate change.

== Campaigns ==
Canadian Youth Delegation

From 2007 to 2011, the Canadian Youth Climate has organised a youth delegation to the United Nations Climate Change Conferences to deliver the voice of the Canadian youth climate movement. At the event in 2007, a member of the Canadian youth delegation delivered a speech on behalf of Greenpeace Solar Generation, Environnement Jeunesse, SustainUS, the Australian Youth Climate Coalition as well as the Canadian Youth Climate Coalition, to representatives from over 150 nations. A group of 20 young Canadians was selected to go to COP17 in Durban.

Power Shift

The Canadian Youth Climate Coalition also organized the Canadian PowerShift conference in 2009 and 2011 and delivered Power Summer training camps across the country in 2010.

Power Summer

Power Summer training camps provide training in popular education, action & strategy, communications, messaging, campaign planning, and organizing skills, and develop understanding of climate justice and building a movement.

Our Demands

The CYCC is inviting all Canadians to join in supporting our demands and demanding responsible action from our politicians. The demands are simple; justice across generations and peoples, youth participation in government decision making, just transition to a green economy and energy for today, tomorrow and the future. All 306 members of parliament have been formally invited to endorse the document; at present time Elizabeth May(Green Party of Canada), Megan Leslie (New Democratic Party), Justin Trudeau (Liberal Party of Canada) among others have pledged their support and commitment. These politicians join famous Canadians and organizations like David Suzuki, Brigette DePape, Maude Barlow, the Council of Canadians, Polaris Institute, Canadian Auto Workers and many others. The 'Our Demands' document is also featured in the Meet Your Member Campaign.

Meet Your Member

The CYCC has organized a campaign encouraging youth to meet with their members of parliament to make sure that our government knows that youth are engaged, and are taking a stand for a just, sustainable future.

== See also ==
- Australian Youth Climate Coalition
- Community youth development
- Energy Action Coalition
- Indian Youth Climate Network
- UK Youth Climate Coalition
- Youth Climate Movement
