= SustainUS =

Youth advocacy body for sustainability

SustainUS, Inc.
- Abbreviation: SustainUS
- Formation: May 2001
- Type: Nonprofit organization, youth organization, sustainable development organization, climate change organization
- Legal status: United States Charity - 501(c)(3)
- Purpose: Youth representation, sustainable development research, advocacy & policy
- Headquarters: Washington, DC
- Location: United States of America
- Region served: United States of America, World
- Members: Nonvoting - anyone living. Voting - living U.S. youth and international youth living in the U.S.A for at least 6 months - ages 13-29
- Official language: Primarily American English. Organization leaders speak more than 15 other.
- Chair, Board of Directors: Kyle Gracey
- Key people: Big Wind Carpenter, delegate to the COP conferences
- Main organ: Steering Committee, Board of Directors
- Parent organization: None
- Affiliations: Climate Action Network - International, International Youth Climate Movement, U.S. Climate Action Network, Global Campaign for Climate Action, Energy Action Coalition
- Budget: $200,000 (2020)
- Staff: 3 (2015)
- Volunteers: about 100 per year
- Website: sustainus.org

SustainUS is a non-profit, nonpartisan, youth-led advocacy group in the United States. Its goal is to improve youth participation and youth empowerment as it relates to advancing sustainable development. SustainUS works particularly with youth and young people aged 13–29 and on United Nations conferences related to youth and/or sustainability.

== History ==
SustainUS was founded in May 2001 at the International Youth Summit in Borgholm, Sweden, to prepare U.S. youth for the World Summit on Sustainable Development.

== Programs ==
SustainUS operates several programs:

- Agents of Change (AoC), begun in 2003, brings delegations of U.S.-based youth to conferences and summits related to international sustainability policy, primarily at the United Nations. Youth delegates work with government delegates, fellow civil society members, and other youth to promote cooperation, focusing on youth-friendly and future-oriented policies. AoC has been active at the United Nations Framework Convention on Climate Change since at least 2005, also the International Forum on the Eradication of Poverty, the Commission for Social Development, Commission on the Status of Women, and the Commission on Sustainable Development.
- Citizen Science is a nationwide youth-led citizen science initiative providing a platform for young scientists and engineers to engage in policy discourse and share scientific knowledge as it relates to sustainable development. The primary goal is to raise the awareness of United States' citizens regarding existing and emerging technologies designed to improve economic, social, and environmental conditions for not only current, but future generations as well. Citizen Science holds an annual paper competition based upon the discussion topics of the upcoming Commission on Sustainable Development. The purpose of the competition is to make technical aspects of those topics relevant and understandable to the general public and influence sound public policy. Competition winners have their work published in the journal Citizen Science, and present to activists and policy-makers at the United Nations Commission on Sustainable Development at the UN Headquarters in New York City as a member of the UN youth delegation.
- Lead Now Fellowship, begun in 2012, offers a small group of fellows individualized mentorship, trainings, and resources to develop their leadership skills and apply them to a sustainable development initiative that they are leading.
- Climate Change Campaigns
