= Youth Climate Movement =

International network of youth organizations

YOUNGO
- Official Children and Youth Constituency of the UNFCCC
- YOUNGO logo
- Abbreviation: YOUNGO
- Formation: December 2005
- Type: International Coalition of Charitable Organizations & Individuals
- Legal status: Active
- Purpose: Youth representation, climate change advocacy
- Headquarters: None
- Location: Representation in over 100 countries
- Region served: Australia, Canada, China, Europe, India, Japan, United Kingdom, United States of America, France
- Members: Open to all youth worldwide active in stopping climate change
- Official language: Over 50. Common communication language is UK English.
- Key people: Sébastien Duyck, Wilson Ang, Kyle Gracey, Anna Keenan, Caroline Howe, Matt Maiorana, Amber Church, Michael Gale
- Main organ: Bottomlining Team - Main coordination entity, No decisionmaking power
- Parent organization: None
- Affiliations: Climate Action Network - International, Global Campaign for Climate Action, Unite for Climate.
- Staff: 0, historically up to 6
- Volunteers: 25000+

YOUNGO is the official children and youth constituency of the United Nations Framework Convention on Climate Change (UNFCCC). YOUNGO is a global network of children and youth activists (up to 35 years) as well as youth NGOs, who contribute to shaping the intergovernmental action on climate change, policies and work to encourage children and youth to formally bring their voices to the UNFCCC processes. The constituency also works to enhance their skills and capacity to drive the ambitious climate actions and policies at all levels towards a livable climate just future.

== Organisation ==
=== Formation ===
Since the Rio Earth Summit in 1992, individual youth have been participating in international negotiations related to different environmental and sustainable development issues. With the formation of the European Youth Forum in 1996, and the U.S. youth organization SustainUS in 2001, youth-run organizations began to send delegations of youth to actively participation in these various worldwide negotiations, principally through the United Nations. Individual youth had been participating in the United Nations Framework Convention on Climate Change, and with the new level of youth organization participation in international negotiations, youth organizations began to identify the UN climate negotiations as a new forum to increase youth participation in.

From November 28 to December 9, 2005, the United Nations (UN) Climate Change Convention (COP 11 or COP/MOP 1) took place at the Palais des congrès de Montréal in Montreal, Quebec, Canada. Youth delegations from member nations, including the United States (via SustainUS), Canada, and Australia, attended to advocate on behalf of young people. As a result, the concept of the International Youth Climate Movement was first developed, though it was originally referred to as the International Youth Delegation, referring to the youth delegates at the international climate negotiations.

Following on from this in September 2006, the Canadian Youth Climate Coalition was launched, consisting of 48 youth organisations from across the nation. This was soon followed by the Australian Youth Climate Coalition in November, which itself was a coalition of 27 youth organisations from across Australia.

=== Structure ===
Across the world, there are youth organisations who have formed coalitions to take positive action on climate change, such as the UK Youth Climate Coalition, which are led entirely by a team of young people. Each Climate Coalition or Climate Network is affiliated to a regional or continental movement. These movements include the African Youth Initiative on Climate Change; Caribbean Youth Environmental Network; European Youth Climate Movement; Project Survival Pacific; Nordic Youth Climate Action Movement; North East Asia Youth Environmental Network; the South American Youth Climate Coalition and the South Asia Youth Environment Network. Consequently, these local, national and continental organisations come together to form the International Youth Climate Movement.

=== Governance ===
The International Youth Climate Movement, although an umbrella term for the movements of young people taking place across the world, is run by teams of volunteers. These teams of volunteers organise themselves into different working groups and form the central organs of the movement, coordinated by a "Bottomlining Team" that helps to organize their efforts, especially at international climate negotiations.

=== Funding ===
The movement is funded by contributions from its member organisations, as well as occasional contributions from organizations like UNICEF and the government of the Netherlands.

=== Members ===
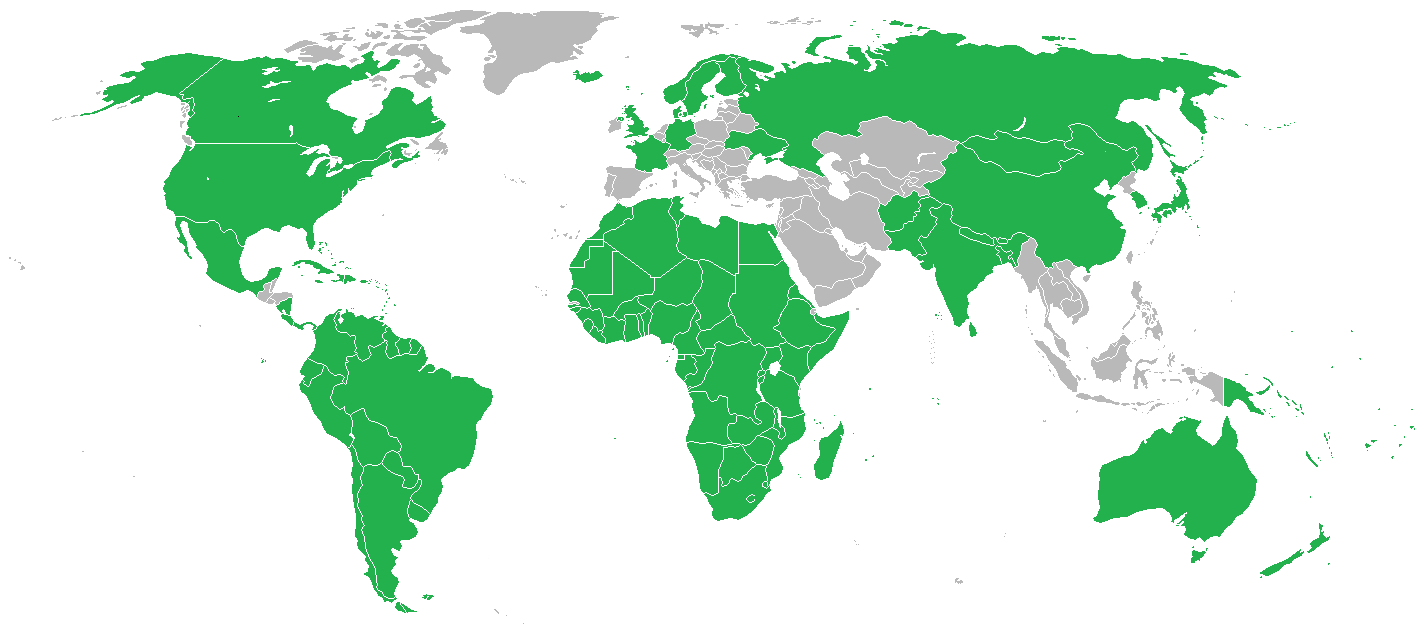
A map of countries participating in the Youth Climate Movement Legend: Participating countries No data

National members of the Youth Climate Movement include: the AYLCF Climate Action Network (France); Australian Youth Climate Coalition; Canadian Youth Climate Coalition; Arab Youth Climate Movement, China Youth Climate Action Network; ECO Singapore; Energy Action Coalition (U.S.A.), headed by coalition organization SustainUS; Project Survival Pacific, Ghana National Youth Coalition on Climate Change; Hong Kong Climate Change Coalition; Indian Youth Climate Network; Japan Youth Ecology League; Malaysian Youth Climate Justice Network; Nature and Youth Denmark; New Zealand Youth Delegation; Nigerian Youth Green Coalition on Climate Change; Russian Youth Climate Movement; Taiwan Youth Climate Coalition; Bangladesh Youth Movement for Climate (BYMC); Young Friends of the Earth; World Alliance of YMCAs; World Association of Girl Guides and Girl Scouts; World Organisation of the Scout Movement, Malaysia Youth Delegation (MYD) and the UK Youth Climate Coalition.

== Conferences and Activities ==
YOUNGO mobilizes, coordinates and empowers a wide range of youth-led activities, campaigns and conferences at the international level, fostering collaboration and collective action among young people across regions.

=== Conference of Youth ===
The first Conference of Youth (COY) was held in 2005, in Montreal, Canada, shortly before the Eleventh Conference of Parties. The event brings together youth delegates for sharing resources, training, networking and collective discussions. It is also an opportunity for the youth climate movement to plan their activities over the course of the negotiations and the subsequent year.

The fifth Conference of Youth took place at the University of Copenhagen from the 4–6 December 2009 where over 700 young people from 100 countries are reported to have attended. The sixth was held at the Universidad del Caribe in preparation for the Cancun climate negotiations.

The two- or three-day event takes place annually, and it is scheduled each year to be held shortly before the United Nations Conference of Parties, where nations convene to assess the progress of the climate negotiations.

=== Local Conference of Youth ===
Local Conferences of Youth on Climate Change (LCOY) are yearly events hosted by young people around the world under the auspices of YOUNGO intending to empower and articulate youth to act against the climate crisis and influence decision-making spaces at the national level, while also connecting them to the wider international climate negotiations. The first LCOYs took place in 2015 as an effort to involve youth all over the world beyond the Conference of Youth (COY). By building their own National Youth Statements (NYS), LCOYs contribute directly to the Global Youth Statement while also advocating for climate policy at home and helping generate strong citizen engagement at the local level.

=== Participation at the UNFCCC negotiation process ===
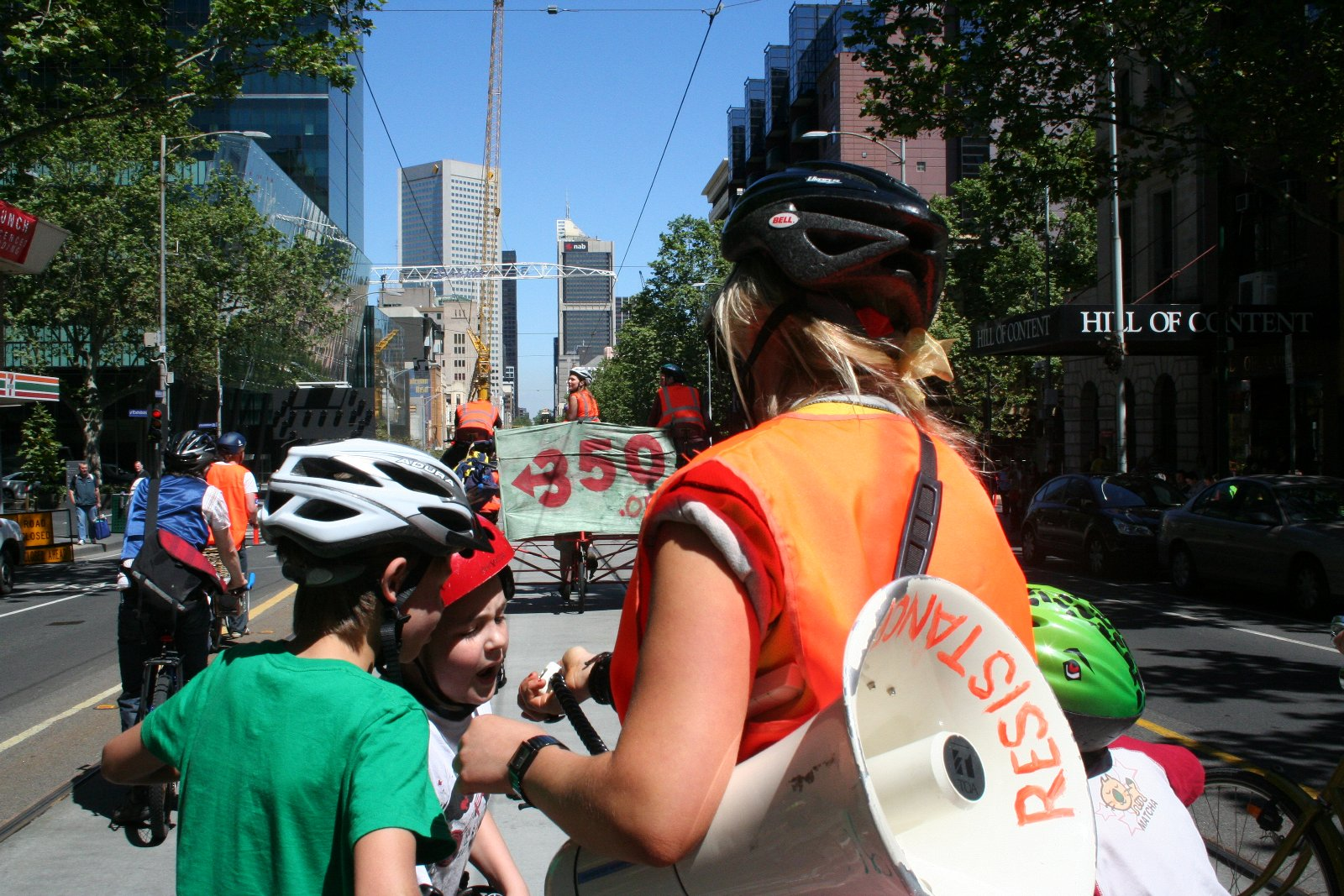
350.org climate change march in Melbourne, Australia in 2009

Since 2005, each domestic coalition or network within the Youth Climate Movement has sent a delegation to the United Nations Climate Change Conference (UNFCCC) to represent young people in their respective country.

In June 2009, the youth organisations participating in the United Nations climate change negotiations submitted an application to become a constituency. In August 2009, the constituency application was provisionally approved by the climate change Secretariat, making youth the 7th constituency to join the climate negotiations. The official title for the youth participation to the climate negotiations is 'YOUNGO'. The maiden focal points for the YOUNGO elected were Wilson Ang (Singapore), sponsored by SustainUS, and Lina Li (China), sponsored by 350.org, representing the International Youth Climate Movement in an official capacity (despite the provisional status until 2011).

Currently, the elected focal points who represent the International Youth Climate Movement are Lauren Nutter (U.S.A.), sponsored by SustainUS, and Jean Paul Brice Affana (Cameroon), sponsored by Jeunes Volontaires pour l'Environnement. They follow 2010-2011 Focal Points, Sébastien Duyck (France), sponsored by Service Civil International and Rishikesh Ram Bhandary (Nepal), sponsored by SustainUS.

Throughout the year, there are other opportunities for the members of the International Youth Climate Movement to convene. For example, at the International Youth Summit on Energy and Climate Change in Beijing, China

In 2021 the health working group in the organization demanded the participation of youth climate activists in post COVID-19 pandemic recovery, as the pandemic is probably linked to climate change.

=== Think 2050 Campaign ===
In 2009, the UK Youth Climate Coalition worked with the Youth Movement, in particular the European Youth Climate Movement and SustainUS to launch the "How old will you be in 2050?" campaign at the United Nations Climate negotiations taking place in Bonn, Germany. The slogan has been used by the Youth Movement since then and was also the focus for the International Youth "Young and Future Generations Day" in December 2009. The campaign seeks to emphasise the need to cut carbon emissions by 80% by 2050 on 1990 levels, as young people will be the ones to inherit this world and decisions made today will have a direct impact on their lives in 40 years time.

=== Participation in writing an international report ===
In 2022, a team of scientists published a report called "Stockholm+50: Unlocking a Better Future", which analyzed the impact of the United Nations Conference on the Human Environment in 1972 and offered recommendations for the future. The key message is to "redefine the relationship between humans and nature, achieve lasting prosperity for all, and invest in a better future." In addition, youth researchers issued a youth version of the report: "Charting a Youth Vision for a Just and Sustainable Future". The key messages are: "Health well being and communal solidarity, living in harmony with nature, international solidarity-living as one global family, a world when all humans are equal." The Youth Climate Movement (YOUNGO) and some of its members helped craft the report.

===== The Global Youth Statement =====
The Global Youth Statement is the largest declaration of children and youth worldwide on climate change. Building upon 20 years of children and youth participation, the process has evolved to incorporate the voice of 100,000s of children and youth globally. It is the official children and youth policy outcome, consolidating climate priorities and policy recommendations into a single advocacy document ahead of the annual United Nations Climate Change Conference.

== See also ==
- Australian Youth Climate Coalition
- Canadian Youth Climate Coalition
- Energy Action Coalition
- Indian Youth Climate Network
- Maldivian Youth Climate Network
- SustainUS
- UK Youth Climate Coalition
- Young Friends of the Earth
- Malaysia Youth Delegation
- Green Africa Youth Organization (GAYO)
