= William Wilkins =

William Wilkins may refer to:

- William Wilkins (architect) (1778–1839), British architect and archaeologist
- William Wilkins (American politician) (1779–1865), American politician from Pennsylvania; served in both houses of Congress and as U.S. Secretary of War
- William Wilkins (educator) (1827–92), Australian teacher and co-founder of Fort Street High School
- William Glyde Wilkins (1854–1921), head of W.G. Wilkins Company, an architectural and engineering firm in Pittsburgh, Pennsylvania
- William Henry Wilkins (1860–1905), English writer
- William J. Wilkins (judge) (1897–1995), American lawyer and judge from the state of Washington
- William Wilkins (British politician) (1899–1987), British Labour Party MP for Bristol South, 1945–1970
- Willie Wilkin (1916–1973), American football player
- William J. Wilkins (architect) (died 1932), American architect who worked in the Carolinas
- William Walter Wilkins (born 1942), former United States federal judge
- Billy Wilkins (active from 1991), Christian musician with the band Third Day
