= Fort Street High School =

School in Sydney, Australia

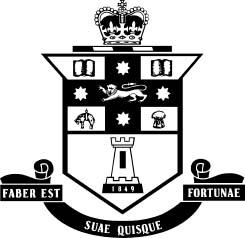

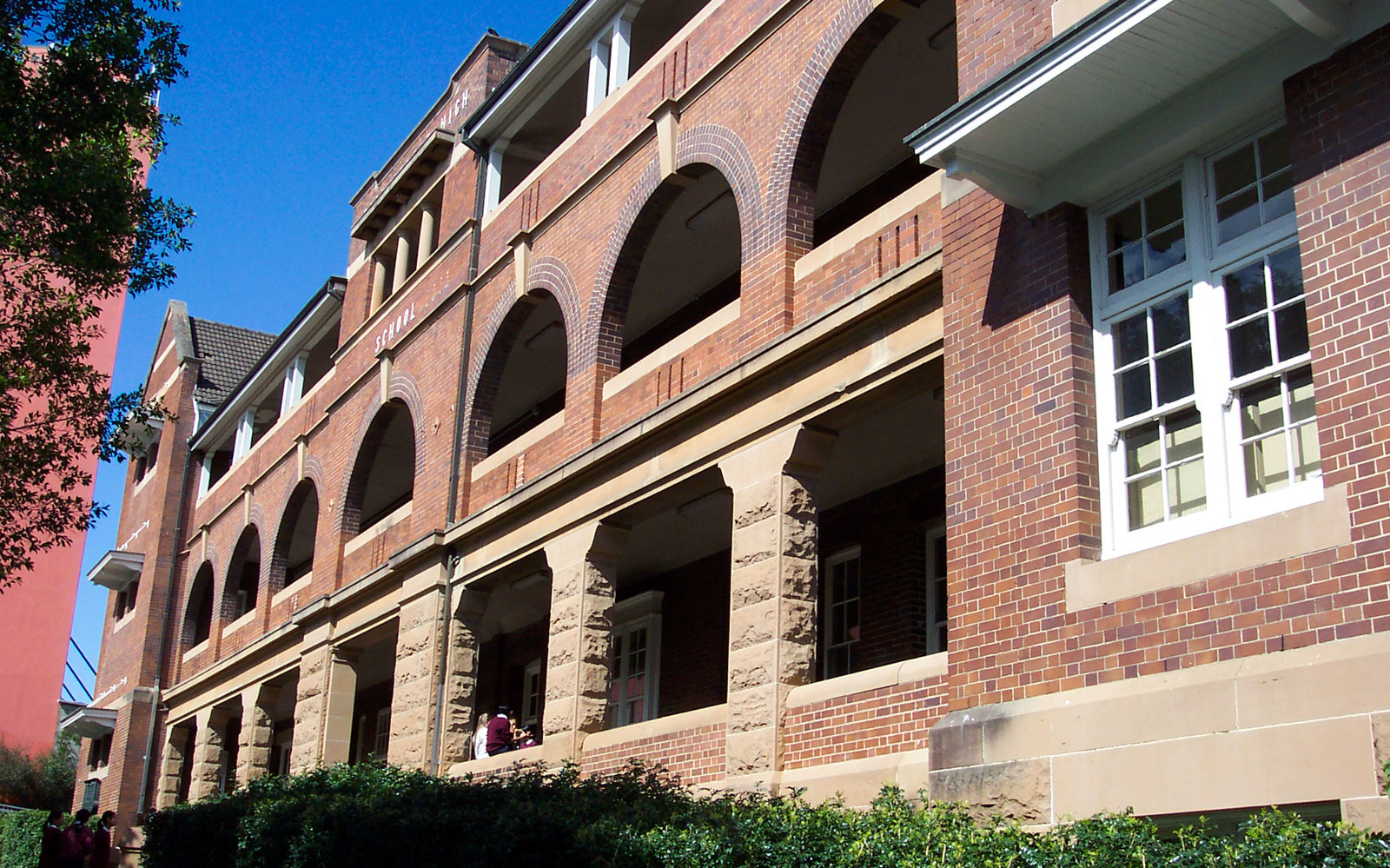
- The Wilkins building of the present Fort Street High School, and the first building to be constructed on the current site.

Location
- Parramatta Road, Petersham, New South Wales; Australia; 33°53′24″S 151°9′10″E

Information
- Other name: Fort Street High School, Petersham
- Former name: Fort Street Model School
- Type: Government-funded co-educational academically selective secondary day school
- Motto: Latin: Faber est suae quisque fortunae (Each person is the maker of their own fortune)
- Established: 1849; 177 years ago
- Sister school: Suginami Sogo High School, Tokyo, Japan
- Educational authority: New South Wales Department of Education
- School code: 8504
- Principal: Juliette McMurray
- Deputy Principals: Joel Morrison; David Sherwin (relieving); Carolyn Mattick (relieving)
- Staff: 13 (non-teaching)
- Teaching staff: 63
- Years: 7–12
- Enrolment: 912 (2024)
- Campus type: Suburban
- Colours: Maroon and white
- Alumni: Fortians
- Website: fortstreet-h.schools.nsw.gov.au

Fort Street High School (FSHS) is a government funded, co-educational, academically selective, secondary day school, located in Petersham, an Inner Western suburb of Sydney, New South Wales, Australia. Its forerunner, Fort Street Model School, was established in Fort Street, Observatory Hill, Sydney, in 1849, the first government high school in Australia and, notably, the first school not founded by parents and community, as a private business or by a religious organisation. Today, it remains a state school operated by New South Wales Department of Education. As an academically selective secondary school, it draws students from a wide area across greater metropolitan Sydney.

To avoid confusion arising from the school's history of separation, amalgamation, and relocation, the present school is designated Fort Street High School, Petersham for official government purposes.

The school's Latin motto is Faber est suae quisque fortunae, translated as "Each person is the maker of his own fortune", a phrase attributed to the ancient Roman Appius Claudius Caecus.

Fort Street High School has a sister school, Suginami Sogo High School, in Tokyo, Japan.

In 2010, The Age reported that, historically, Fort Street High School ranked equal fourth among Australian schools, based on the number of alumni who had been honoured as a Companion of the Order of Australia (AC).^{[note a]}

== History ==
=== Fort Street Model School ===
The history of public education in Australia began when the governor of New South Wales, Charles FitzRoy, established a Board of National Education on 8 January 1848 to implement a national system of education throughout the Colony of New South Wales. The board decided to create two model schools, one for boys and one for girls. The site of Fort Street Model School was chosen as the old Military Hospital at Fort Phillip, on Observatory Hill. This school was not only intended to educate boys and girls, but also to serve as a model for other schools in the colony. The school's name is derived from the name of a street that ran into the grounds of the hospital and became part of the playground during its reconstruction. The street name is perpetuated in the small street in Petersham that leads to the present school.

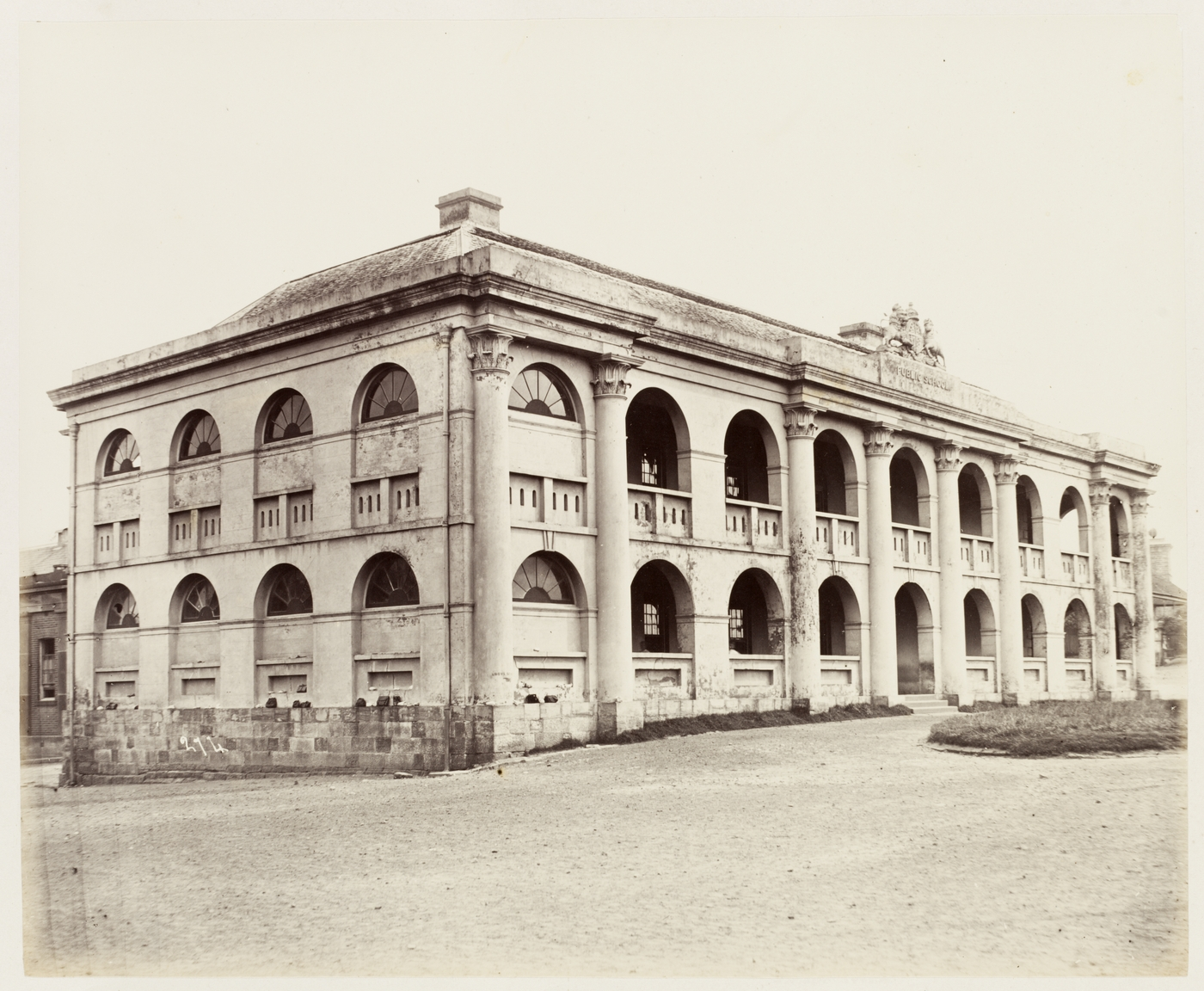
Fort Street Model School in 1872

The school was officially established on 1 September 1849, when the conversion of the building was approved by the government. This original school building is visible today beside the southern approaches to the Sydney Harbour Bridge. The establishment of Fort Street Model School marked the establishment of a non-denominational system of school, where the government undertook the education of its people, separate from religion. The influence of the Fort Street Model School was substantial, forming the basis for education throughout the colonies:

At the same time at the Fort Street National School in Sydney William Wilkins was teaching pupil-teachers how to lead the children of New South Wales out of darkness into the light. He was holding out to them that bright prospect of the day when every locality however remote and every family however humble was supplied with the ameliorating influences of an education, which would teach every man, woman and child in the colony to form the habits of regularity, cleanliness, orderly behaviour, and regard for the rights of both public and private property, as well as the habit of obedience to the law, and respect for duly constituted authority. In Melbourne, Adelaide and Hobart his counterparts were preaching the same gospel of humanity marching forward, reaching upward for the light. – Manning Clark, A History of Australia, Vol. 4, The Earth Abideth Forever 1851–1888

In 1881, the school was raised to the status of Superior Public School.

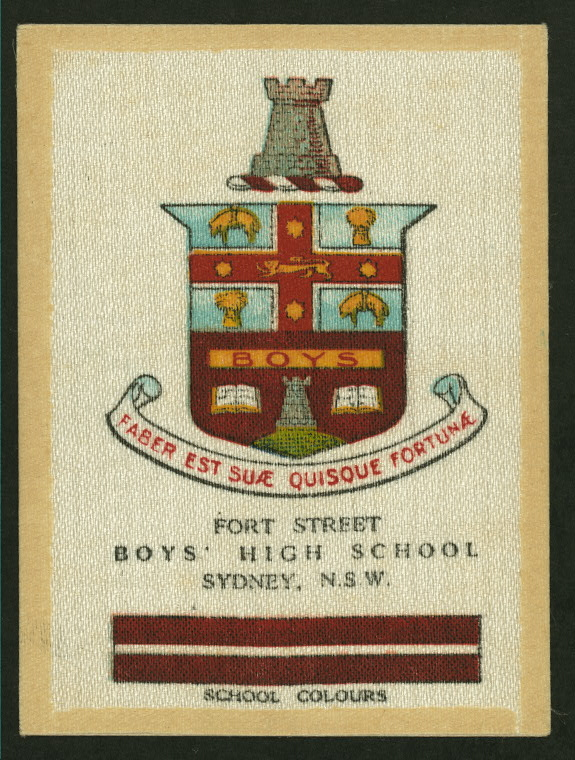
A cigarette card from c. 1920 showing the crest and colours of Fort Street Boys' High School

=== Formation of Fort Street Public, Boys' High, and Girls' High Schools ===
In 1911, the school was split into one primary and two secondary schools: Fort Street Public School, Fort Street Boys' High School and Fort Street Girls' High School. Due to space limitations at Observatory Hill, in 1916, the boys' school was moved to the school's present site, on Taverner's Hill, Petersham. The girls' school remained at Observatory Hill until 1974/75, when the two schools were amalgamated to form the current co-educational school at Petersham. During that time, its grounds continued to be consumed by the growing city; for example, the Sydney Harbour Bridge, which opened in 1932, took most of the playground. Fort Street Public School remains at Observatory Hill.

For many years from 1912 George Mackaness was the English master and deputy headmaster at Fort Street Boys' High School. He published Inspirational Teaching (1928) on his teaching techniques.

=== 21st century ===
The school celebrated its sesquicentenary in 1999.

By the 21st century, its student population is a diverse one; students come from over 100 suburbs in Sydney, from places as far as Hornsby, the Blue Mountains, Cabramatta, Fairfield, and Canterbury, and a range of cultural backgrounds. Students past and present are referred to as "Fortians".

Ronald Horan was for many years a master at the school. As well as writing foreign language textbooks, he was the author of a history of the school, Fort Street, the School which was later followed by Maroon and Silver.

On 5 August 2022, a stonemason working at the school died in an accident. The worker had been restoring the facade of the 170-year-old public school when he was crushed by a sandstone concrete slab weighing several tonnes.

In April 2026, a former student who attended the school in the 1980s sued the state with allegations of being repeatedly sexually assaulted by a teacher and that her complaint was ignored.

== Campus ==
Fort Street High School is located on a single campus adjacent to Parramatta Road in Petersham, a suburb in the inner-west of Sydney. The school occupies almost the entire street block, and is surrounded by Parramatta Road, Palace Street and Andreas Street with access from Fort Street.

The Petersham campus centres on the Romanesque Revival main building (formerly known to most staff and students simply as "the old block") now named the Wilkins Building after William Wilkins, who played an instrumental role in the formation of the education system in New South Wales in the latter half of the nineteenth century. The other buildings include the Kilgour building, the Memorial Hall and the newest additions, the Cohen and Rowe buildings, which were completed in 2004.

School facilities include a library, a gymnasium, an oval, futsal courts, basketball courts, volleyball courts, cricket practice nets, a canteen, a STEM makerspace and a performing arts block.

After years of campaigning for insulation, the school received funding for noise reduction technology, as it is located beneath an air corridor. Work on in the school was scheduled to start in mid-2010 and began in the Memorial Hall at the request of the school principal, Roslynne Moxham, to provide a quiet environment for exams being held in the hall including the Higher School Certificate. It was completed in January 2012, with the completion of insulation in the Wilkins and Kilgour blocks.

The school's original Observatory Hill campus is now used by the National Trust of Australia.

== Extra-curricular activities ==
=== Sport ===
Fort Street High also offers sports as part of its formal and co-curricular programs. Year 7 to 10 students experience sports through the Physical Education program, and Years 8 to 11 have the option to participate in zone and knockout sports. Year 12 students are not required to undertake sport but may partake if requested. Students who are not involved in competition undertake in Year 8 skill-based sport, and in Years 9 to 11 recreational sports. Sports offered include Ultimate Frisbee, hockey, rugby union, aerobics, basketball, ice skating, netball, K-pop dancing, pilates, soccer, water polo, cricket, tennis, baseball, volleyball, recreational gym, Oz-tag, rock climbing and touch football.

=== Instrumental Music Program (IMP) ===
The Instrumental Music Program is the largest co-curricular program in the school involving over 300 students. In 2002, it won the Director-General's School Achievement Award for providing opportunities for students to enrich and expand their expertise as musicians and performers. The large ensembles include the Wind Ensemble, Wind Orchestra, Concert Band, Training Band, Symphony Orchestra, Philharmonic Orchestra and Vocal Ensemble. In addition, the extension ensembles include the Jazz Orchestra, Big Band, Jazz Ensemble, Percussion Ensembles, and Chamber Choir.

=== Charity Committees ===
Each year group has a charity committee, focusing on different issues and charities throughout the year. They often hold highly successful fundraising stalls, such as cake stalls, student hairspray salons, live entertainment, raffles and gold-coin donation drives. In 2015, the Year 8 Charity Committee (class of 2019) established a team to participate in the annual Seven Bridges Walk, raising over $21,100. They have since established this as an annual tradition, where over $88,351 has been raised by the Year 8 Charity Committees from 2015 to 2019 inclusive. It is also a tradition for the Year 12 Charity Committee to run the World's Greatest Shave, an annual fundraiser run by the Leukaemia Foundation which raises awareness and funds for blood cancer research and treatment.

=== Robotics Club (FSHS Robotics) ===
FSHS Robotics is a student-run robotics club with the aim of providing students passionate in STEM with a holistic experience of engineering from conception to production in preparation for the RoboCup Junior Australia (RCJA) competition.

=== Maker Society ===
The Fort Street High School Maker Society is a co-curricular group where students can complete a variety of STEM activities. Students choose one or more STEM-related activities such as the Aeronautical Velocity, STEM Video Game or Formula 1 in Schools challenges and work on the activity during Maker Society sessions, all under the supervision and guidance of the TAS (Technology and Applied studies) teachers. It provides a social hub to inspire students to start their own projects, as well as a makerspace which contains facilities such as a laser cutter, multiple 3D printers, a CNC machine and various electronic test equipment.

=== Student Representative Council (SRC) ===
The student body is represented by the Student Representative Council (SRC). The SRC also run, in collaboration with the P&C, the biennial Fort Street Festival (Fort Fest), which allows students to open a stall at the school on the day, usually a Sunday at the beginning of June. It features a Talent Quest (previously the Battle of the Bands), a program where individuals and groups compete to win prizes. There are stalls from various student groups, including the Environment Committee, the Student Anti-Racism Network, and Amnesty International. In 2010, other stalls included Nova 96.9, NSW Police and the NSW Fire Department. Fort Fest was paused during Covid times, however, resumed in 2024, celebrating the 175th anniversary of the school.

=== Environment Committee ===
The Environment Committee is a student body that was formed in late 2007 by Paul Pagani, a teacher at the school. The committee currently has over 40 members ranging from Years 7 to 12, and is led by a president. The Environment Committee works in partnership with other schools in the local area, such as Petersham Public School and Newtown High School of the Performing Arts. In a nod towards the school's heritage, the Committee worked closely with the Observatory Hill Environmental Educational Centre, including the planning of EcoTour 2010. The committee's past and present projects include running a Recycling Program run with the assistance of Visy, installing two water tanks (each having a 2000L capacity), installing 6 1.5 kW Solar Panels, regenerating plants with indigenous natives along Andreas Street, controlling a worm farm and running the annual Earth Hour. The Environmental Committee introduced the Composting program in 2022, run on a fortnightly roster with student volunteers.

=== STIVE ===
For more than 20 years, Fort Street High School has supported a student led and mentored, voluntary Christian program called STIVE (students alive).

=== Other ===
Other extracurricular activities include debating (the Year 7 and 8 team was the state champion in 2010), public speaking, mock trial (Fort Street was the 2009 New South Wales Champions), mooting (Fort Street was the winning team of the 2021 University of Western Sydney Kirby Cup), Tournament of Minds, Duke of Edinburgh's Award Scheme, theatresports, photography, and dance.

== School traditions ==
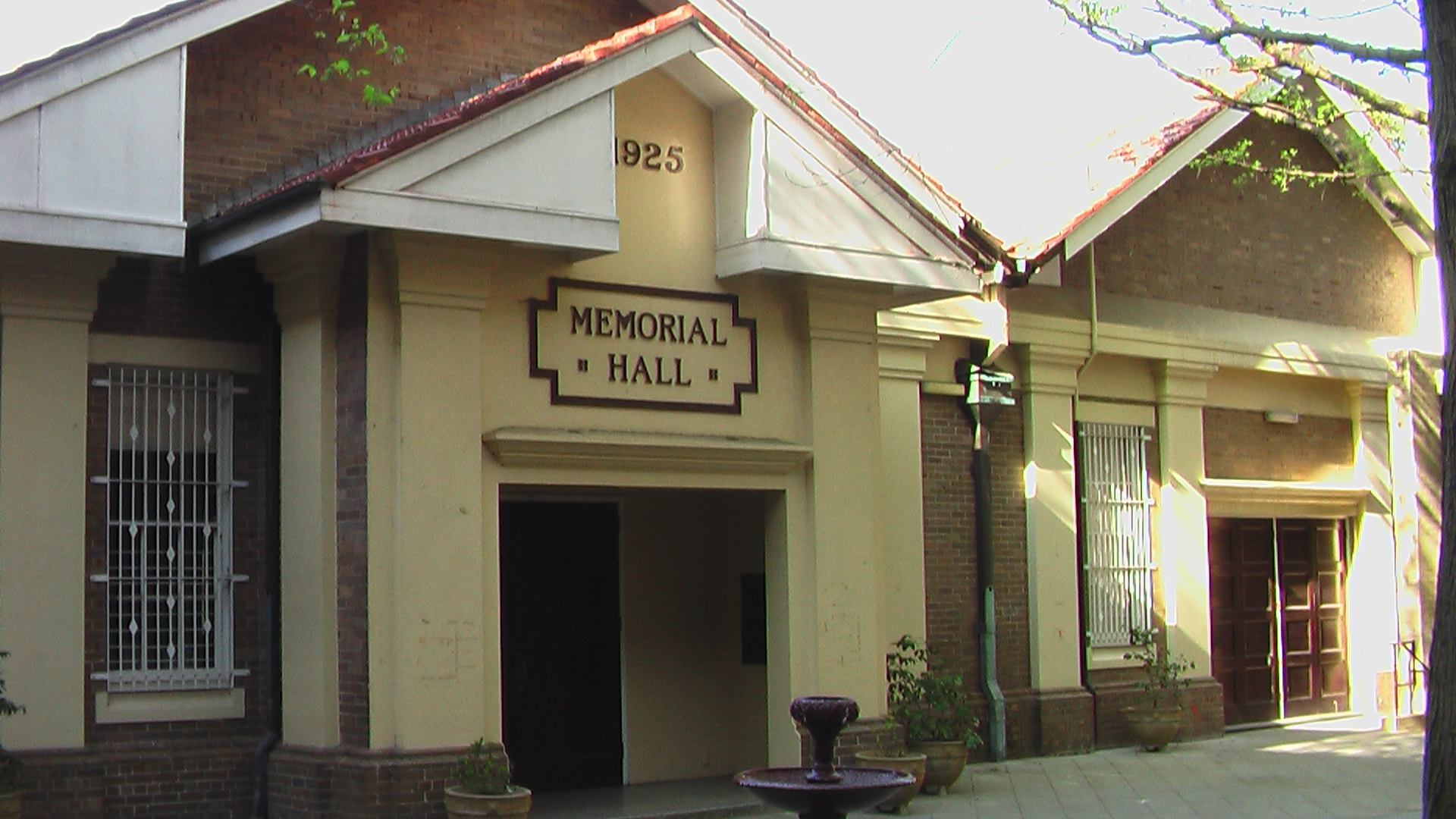
School assemblies and special events are held at the Memorial Hall

Fort Street utilises a house system. The school is organised into five official houses, to which each student is assigned. The houses are named after prominent alumni of the school, each representing different areas of endeavour: Joshi, named after Nalini Joshi, the first female professor in the School of Mathematics and Statistics at the University of Sydney; Kirby, named after Michael Kirby, former Justice of the High Court of Australia; Mawson, named after Douglas Mawson, Antarctic explorer; Preston, named after artist Margaret Preston; and Sheikh, named after Simon Sheikh, Australian activist and CEO of superannuation fund Future Super. Houses compete in sporting and academic endeavours for the Kennedy Cup, named after athlete Clarice Kennedy.

Since 1899, the school has published the Fortian magazine, the school's annual review and yearbook. The name later came to refer to all students of the schools past and present. An extensive alumni network is maintained through the school's alumni association, the Fortians' Union, formed by the amalgamation of the Old Boys' Union and the Fort Street Old Girls' Union. In addition to maintaining the alumni network, the Union also assists the school and promotes its traditions. It holds an annual dinner each October, with some student reunions held concurrently with this event. The Fortians' Union publishes Faber Est, a monthly newsletter.

An annual Speech Day is held near the beginning of each year at which student achievements are recognised and awards are presented. An address is given by a prominent Fortian, principal and valedictorian of the previous year's graduating class. In the past, Speech Day events have been held at various venues, including the school's Memorial Hall and the Sydney Opera House. In recent years, the ceremony has been held at Sydney Town Hall.

Throughout its history, the various Fort Street schools have had a number of school songs. At present, at assemblies, the simply-named School Song which is Come Let the Strains resound that Echo Fort Street's Glory and Gaudeamus igitur are sung at the beginning of assemblies, with Fort Street's Name Rings Around the World sung as the recessional, at its conclusion.

FLOP (Fortians' Last Outstanding Performance), an annual student revue performed by outgoing Year 12 students, has been performed for many years, beginning in 1976. It usually involves humorous sketches, often parodying school life and teachers, and, in the digital era, the primary medium has been video. These are usually filmed in and out of class time after students' HSC Trial exams, taking place in early Term 3. These are shown during the graduation assembly - also known as FLOP. Musical pieces, both serious and funny, were once often performed. In its more recent years, various restrictions were imposed on FLOP, including a ban on the use of cars in videos, and a requirement for videos to not include swearing and nudity (a FLOP 2002 video involved a full-length nudity scene). In 2010, FLOP was officially 'cancelled', however, in line with Fort Street students' long history of being a prominent source of progressive activism in Australia, the decision was fiercely contested by student-led protest groups and FLOP continued in its rebellious nature, including during 2021, when due to COVID-19, students were absent from school for most of their final term – when the filming takes place.

== Alumni ==
Fort Street alumni, as well as current attendees, are traditionally called "Fortians". Prominent former students include Australia's first Prime Minister, Edmund Barton, a Governor-General of Australia, and five justices of the High Court of Australia (including Michael Kirby), the highest number among government schools in Australia and the second highest among all schools in Australia. Fortians have also served as the President of the United Nations General Assembly (Herbert Evatt) and the President of the International Court of Justice (Percy Spender) (in each case, the only Australians to date to hold such positions), justices of the Supreme Court of New South Wales, Federal Court of Australia and other state and federal courts, Premiers of New South Wales, and Chancellors of the University of Sydney, the University of New South Wales and other universities. Among its graduates are also well known celebrities. In 2010, The Age reported that Fort Street High School ranked equal fourth among Australian schools based on the number of alumni who had received a top Order of Australia honour.

Royal Australian Air Force fighter pilot, Pat Hughes, DFC, who was killed flying a Spitfire in the Battle of Britain, attended the School in 1934.

== See also ==
- List of government schools in New South Wales
- List of selective high schools in New South Wales
