= Australian Youth Climate Coalition =

Australian climate change organisation

- Abbreviation: AYCC
- Formation: November 2006
- Purpose: Climate justice
- Headquarters: Melbourne, Victoria, Australia
- Region served: Australia
- Members: 150,000+
- National director: Grace Vegesana
- Website: www.aycc.org.au

The Australian Youth Climate Coalition (AYCC) is a youth organisation in Australia focused on climate change activism. The organisation aims "to build a movement of young people leading solutions to the climate crisis", by empowerment and education, running strategic campaigns, shifting the narrative, and building a movement.

When the organisation began in 2006, the coalition consisted of 27 other youth organisations, but later became independent. AYCC works closely with the Seed Indigenous Youth Climate Network.

== History ==
In 2004, organisations which would later form the Youth Climate Movement, began to come together. Following the formation of the Canadian Youth Climate Coalition in September 2006, the Australian Youth Climate Coalition formed in November 2006 with 27 youth organisations from across the nation at a founding youth summit.

The original affiliated organisations included:

- Australian Climate Change Education Network
- Affinity
- AIESEC
- Australian Medical Students' Association
- Australian Student Environment Network
- Australian Youth Affairs Coalition
- Centre for Sustainability Leadership
- Engineers Without Borders
- International Young Professionals Foundation
- Just Act
- Law Students for a Just Community
- National Indigenous Youth Movement of Australia
- National Union of Students of Australia
- Oaktree
- Oz Green
- Sai Youth
- Student Organised Network for Architecture
- Otesha Project (Australia)
- UN Youth Australia
- Vision Generation

The organisation later became an independent entity.

In 2009, Finance Minister Lindsay Tanner awarded the Australian Youth Climate Coalition's co-founders, Amanda McKenzie and Anna Rose, as well as its then national director Ellen Sandell, with the Environment Minister's Young Environmentalist of the Year Award for their efforts.

In 2011, the national director was Ellen Sandell, who was on The Age list of top 100 most influential people in Melbourne, and had been nominated as 2009 Victorian Young Australian of the Year.

In 2020, Seed Indigenous Youth Climate Network, or Seed Mob, separated from AYCC and became an independent network of Indigenous Australian activists.

== Description and governance ==
The Australian Youth Climate Coalition is a non-partisan, non-profit youth organisation in Australia focused on climate change activism The organisation aims "to build a movement of young people leading solutions to the climate crisis".

As of August 2024 the national director is Grace Vegesana.

== Campaigns ==
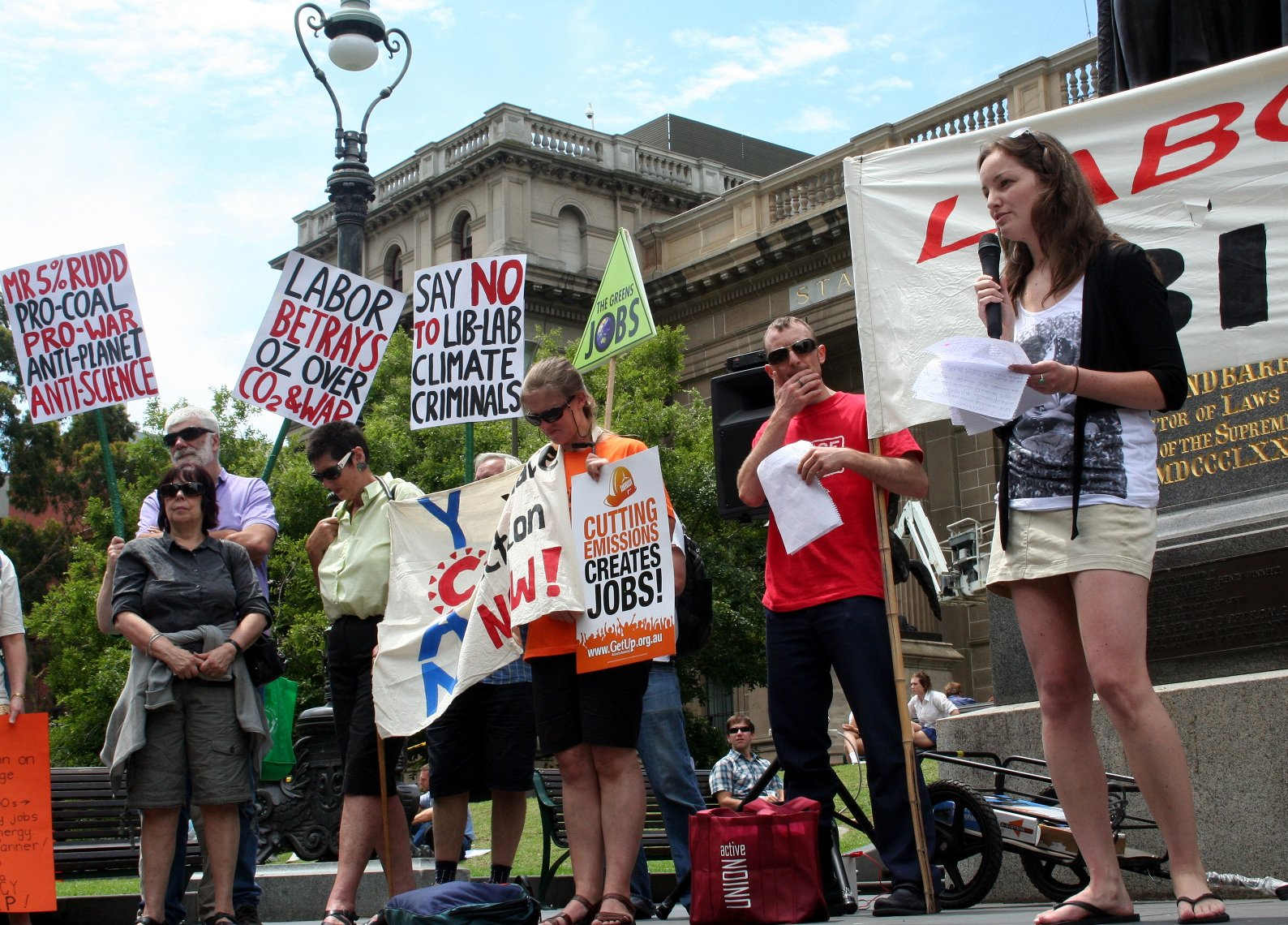
Demonstration in Melbourne (2009)

In the 2010s, the Australian Youth Climate Coalition frequently sent a youth delegation to the United Nations Conferences on Climate Change to advocate on behalf of young people. For the 2008 conference in Poznań, Poland, the Australian delegation travelled through ten nations to reach the summit. Similarly in December 2009, the organisation sent a second youth delegation to the 2009 United Nations Climate Change Conference along with other members of the Youth Climate Movement.

=== Power Shift ===
Power Shift is the name of an annual youth summit which was held in the United States for the first time in 2007. Two years later in 2009, the Australian Youth Climate Coalition, in partnership with the University of Western Sydney, GetUp, and Greenpeace, organised the Australian Powershift Conference on 11 to 13 July 2009. The summit attracted 1,500 young people. Guests included former Vice President of the USA Al Gore, the swimmer Ian Thorpe and the actress Brooke Satchwell. The event concluded with a gathering outside the Sydney Opera House.

The AYCC ran regional Power Shift in 2010 in Adelaide, Canberra, and Geelong. In 2011 Power Shift was held in Brisbane and Perth with 1000 young people. The summits included a range of speakers, events and workshops.

In July 2013 AYCC hosted Australia's largest ever youth climate summit in Melbourne.

=== Youth Decide ===
In September 2009 the AYCC organised Youth Decide with World Vision Australia. It was Australia's first national youth climate vote. Around 2,000 volunteers ran 330 Youth Decide events, with over 37,500 young people voting.

In September 2011 the AYCC held a second Youth Decide, giving young people the opportunity to vote on the renewable energy targets they wanted the Federal Government to set.

=== 2010 Election Campaign ===
During the 2010 election campaign the AYCC mobilised hundreds of young people to put climate change back on the political agenda. This included automated phone calls to politicians, hanging out scorecards rating the three main political parties climate policies and the very popular climate elephant, which was featured widely in the media and is now used as an example of excellent grassroots election campaigning.

=== Meet Your Member ===
In 2011 the AYCC ran a campaign called Meet Your Member. This involved young people from all across the country meeting with their local MP or Senator and express their view on Climate Change. Local volunteers also collected hundreds of signatures on postcards which they presented to MP's in the meetings.

=== Walk for Solar ===
In 2012 100 young people walked 328 km over 15 days from Port Augusta to Adelaide. This major event, organised by the AYCC, was part of the wider Repower Port Augusta campaign, pushing for investment in Australia's first concentrated solar thermal plant in Port Augusta. The event gained significant national media and political attention. The chief spokesperson for the project was Daniel Spencer.

=== Stop Adani ===
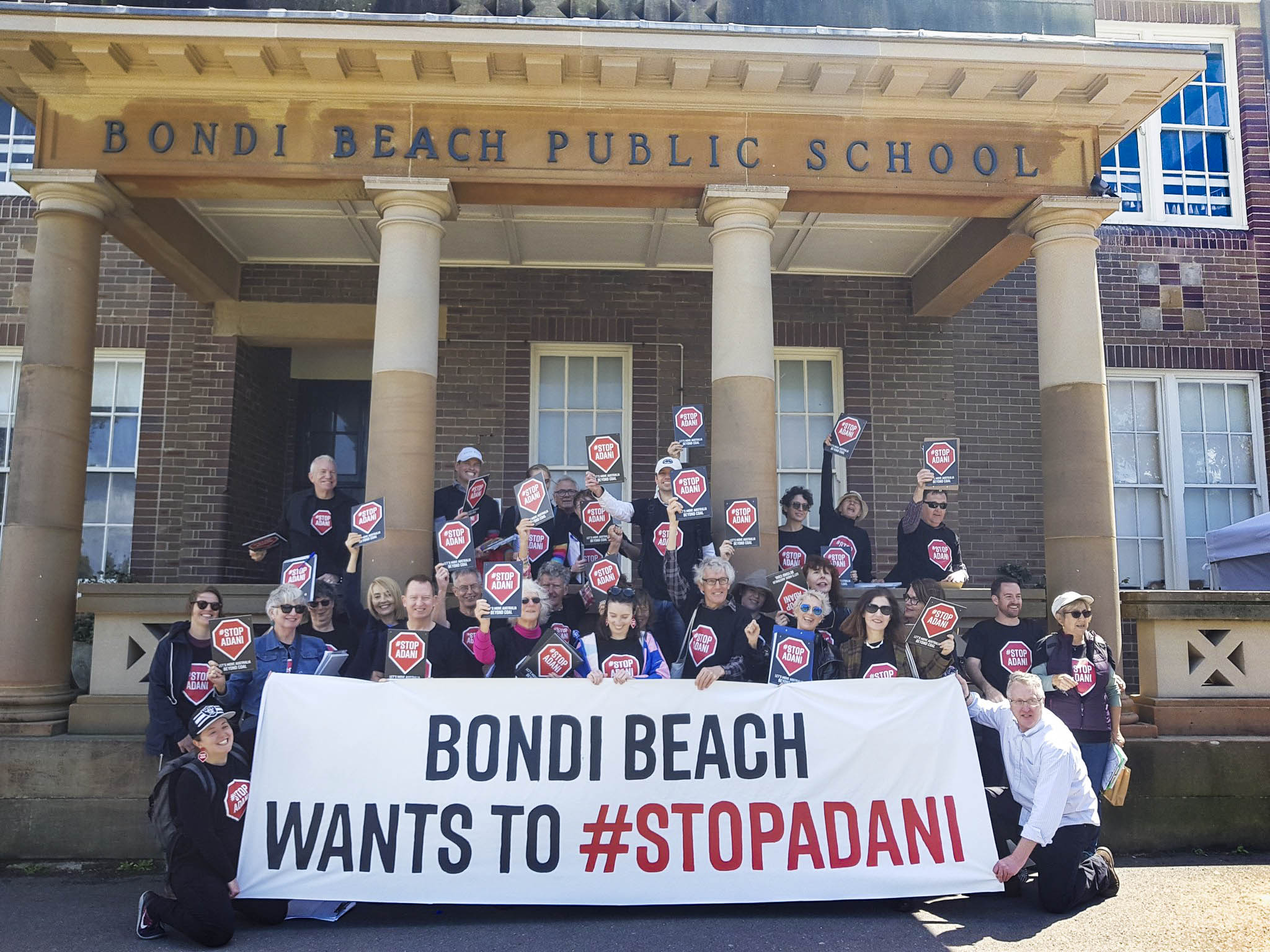
Bondi Beach doorknock during the Wentworth by-election, 6 October 2018

In July 2014 at a National Summit with 200 young people in Canberra, AYCC launched the #StopAdani campaign to get Westpac to rule out working with Adani. This was the first of many of visits young people paid to Westpac bank branches and HQs. AYCC had tens of thousands of conversations with customers, and delivered the message to Westpac. After a three-year campaign, in 2017, Westpac announced their updated climate policy, which not only rules out involvement in Adani but sets a pathway to transition out of thermal coal and into more renewable energy.

== Funding ==
The AYCC declared a gross income of A$$1,539,042 in 2025. The majority of AYCC funding is from donations and bequests (96.53%).

== See also ==
- Community youth development
- Energy Action Coalition
- Youth Climate Movement
