= Students of Sustainability =

Students of Sustainability (SoS) is an annual conference of the Australian student environment and social justice movement and predates the Australian Student Environment Network (ASEN). The first Students of Sustainability conference was held at ANU in 1991 when it was called Students, Science and Sustainability. The name changed in 1995 to Students and Sustainability and then again in 2003 to Students of Sustainability. In each case the name changes were to make the conference open to a wider range of participants. Students of Sustainability always runs in July co-currently with NAIDOC week, Aboriginal and Islander politics and affairs play a major part in the SOS program.

== History ==
The conference began in Canberra in 1991 under the name 'Students, Science and Sustainability'. This first conference (April 24–26, 1991) attracted more than 300 students from every Australian State and Territory to discuss matters of sustainability with respect to students and science. This first conference was organised by a small group of ANU undergraduates, including John Reynolds, Padma Raman, Tristan Armstrong, Naomi Flutter and Joely-Kym Sobott, among others. One of the many high profile speakers was the late Australian historian Manning Clark AC. Since then, interest and enthusiasm for the conference has grown, and the number of participants has steadily increased. As SoS moves around the country, it spreads its unique, life-affirming, change-making energy to the University and community that hosts it.

== Description ==
From the website www.studentsofsustainability.org which is run by the hosting crew each year:

Aims of SoS • to inspire ecologically sustainable practices as an alternative - to current societal values • to empower individuals and groups to bring about positive social and political change through open forums, skill sharing opportunities • to create national and international networks of environmentally-minded people • to integrate environmentalism with other progressive movements such as human rights and cultural awareness movements • and to create a conference that is accessible to as many people as possible.

Organise - The SoS organising committee advocates supportive, respectful and constructive involvement in all aspects of the conference. All participants share their knowledge and learn from each other, bringing their own opinions, voices and ideas. This diversity of voices, ideas and opinions makes SoS what it is.

== Locations ==
The location of SoS varies each year depending on the location of the bidding organising collective. Past and present SoS locations include:

- 2020 (January) - University of Sydney Cumberland Campus, Sydney
- 2018 - Melbourne Polytechnic Fairfield campus Melbourne
- 2017 - Tighes Hill TAFE, Newcastle
- 2016 - Musgrave Park, Brisbane
- 2015 - Flinders University, Adelaide
- 2014 - Australian National University, Canberra
- 2013 - University of Tasmania, Launceston
- 2012 - La Trobe University, Bendigo
- 2011 - Charles Sturt University, Albury
- 2010 - Flinders University, Adelaide
- 2009 - Monash University, Melbourne
- 2008 - Newcastle University, Newcastle
- 2007 - Murdoch University, Perth
- 2006 - University of Queensland, Brisbane
- 2005 - Monash University, Melbourne
- 2004 - La Trobe University, Melbourne
- 2003 - Flinders University, Adelaide
- 2002 - Murdoch University, Perth
- 2001 - University of Newcastle, Newcastle
- 2000 - Griffith University, Brisbane
- 1999 - University of Western Sydney, Sydney
- 1998 - University of Tasmania, Hobart
- 1997 - James Cook University, Townsville
- 1996 - Southern Cross University, Lismore
- 1995 - Flinders University, Adelaide
- 1994 - Macquarie University, Sydney
- 1993 - Melbourne University, Melbourne
- 1992 - Griffith University, Brisbane or Gold Coast
- 1991 - Australian National University, Canberra
