= Seed Mob =

Indigenous climate change organisation

Seed Mob, officially Seed Indigenous Youth Climate Network Ltd and also known simply as Seed, is an independent Indigenous youth climate network in Australia. Established in 2014, it is led by Aboriginal and Torres Strait Islander young people and relies on donations by supporters and partners who align with their values. In 2018 Seed released the documentary film Water is Life, which highlighted the dangers of fracking in the Northern Territory.

== History ==
Seed, established in 2014, is Australia's first Indigenous youth climate network, co-founded by South Sea Islander / Bundjalung woman Amelia Telford and Larissa Baldwin-Roberts (who later became CEO of political activist group GetUp!), initially as a branch of the Australian Youth Climate Coalition.

Telford was NAIDOC Youth of the Year in 2014, when she was Indigenous Coordinator for the Australian Youth Climate Coalition, and planning to expand the Indigenous program to train and mentor around 50 Indigenous young people across the country. She was also awarded Bob Brown's 2015 Young Environmentalist for the Year award, and Australian Geographic Young Conservationist of the Year in 2015.

In 2018, Seed released the documentary short film Water is Life, which showed the dangers of fracking in the Northern Territory. It was filmed over two years and funded by supporters. The team travelled to North Dakota, US, where they talked to native American community member Kandi Mosset, who is featured in the film showing how fracking has impacted their community since its inception in 2006. In the film, community leaders in Borroloola relate the impact of climate change on bush foods, among other things.

In August 2020, Seed became an independent entity, registered with the ACNC as Seed Indigenous Youth Climate Network Ltd. With the new status, the board would comprise only First Nations people, and the number of paid staff was increased.

== Description ==
Seed Mob is an Indigenous youth climate network in Australia, led by Aboriginal and Torres Strait Islander young people. It does not accept government funding, and all potential donors are screened to ensure that their support aligns with Seed's values. It relies heavily on funding by community members.

Co-founder Amelia Telford, is as of 2021 its national director. As of 2024 Ivan Ingram is chair of the organisation.

Its aims "to build the skills, confidence, and networks of young First Nations people to protect our land, water and future from the impacts of climate change", and amplify First Nations communities' voices in order to lead to solutions to reduce the impact of climate change in Australia.

Seed Mob relies on its network of volunteers, who work to protect country from fossil fuel extraction on sacred land, and support other groups working in climate change activism.

== Campaigns and activism ==
Seed has supported other activist groups, such as joining in a flotilla action by the Pacific Climate Warriors in 2014, blocking the Newcastle coal port for a full day.

In 2017, Seed, then in an alliance of 13 environmental groups as part of the Australian Youth Climate Coalition, was successful, after a three-year campaign targeting Australia's four largest banks to rule out funding the Adani coal mine in Queensland (now the Stop Adani campaign), in getting Westpac to change their policies.

By 2017 the group was holding regular protests in Canberra, including one in which hundreds of lanterns spelt out "Land Rights not Mining Rights" on the lawns of Parliament House.

Since Origin Energy announced plans to start gas fracking in the Beetaloo Basin in the Northern Territory in November 2019, Seed has been campaigning against the company's plans. It produced a film about the campaign called Water is Life in 2019.

In 2020, the group supported Gomeroi Traditional Owners in New South Wales in to protest against recent approval of Santos' gas project in Narrabri, which planned to drill 850 wells in the Pilliga forest in north-central NSW. Thousands marched across the country to oppose the A$3.6 billion project.

== Media and global impact ==
Since their 2018 documentary Water is Life, the title has become a widely-shared slogan across the world.

In 2019, Hollywood star Leonardo DiCaprio shared a photo on Instagram of the group staging a sit-in at Parliament House, Canberra, calling for the cessation of fracking, coal mining and water sharing.

== Partners ==
Seed has investment partnerships with businesses whose values align with the organisation, such as Bank Australia.
