= Australian Student Environment Network =

The Australian Student Environment Network (ASEN) is the national network of many campus environment collectives in Australia, formed at the 1997 Students and Sustainability convergence in Townsville. People from ASEN facilitate communication between environment collectives and co-ordinate national projects and campaigns. ASEN is particularly known for cultivating intersectional social justice analyses and critiques amongst young environmentalists, facilitating direct action campaigns, projects towards just transitions and indigenous solidarity work. ASEN is the longest running, and one of the largest, youth environment networks in Australia.

== Projects and campaigns ==
=== Students of Sustainability Conference ===
Students of Sustainability is an annual conference usually held on a university campus during the winter break (July). Since ASEN was created by the 1997 Townsville Students of Sustainability conference, the national network has helped to organise the conference each year.

=== National Training Camp ===
Annually in January ASEN holds a training camp for people who want to learn about environmental campaigns, indigenous solidarity, campaign strategy, self-education, advocacy and develop knowledge and skills for continuing the network.

=== Indigenous Solidarity and Nuclear-Free ===
ASEN aims to work with Australia's indigenous peoples in their struggles for sovereignty and self-determination. This includes supporting communities fighting the nuclear mining and energy industry on their lands. ASEN contributes annually to the Aboriginal Tent Embassy convergence in Canberra on Survival/Invasion Day.

=== Fossil fuels divestment ===
ASEN is the main contributor to university campus fossil fuels divestment campaigns. In 2012 ANU's environment collective began a divestment campaign which led the broader ASEN network to begin a national campaign known as "Lock The Campus" which later formed the "Fossil Free Universities" campaign with 350.org and other national groups. This campaign is current and ongoing, constituting one of ASEN's biggest commitments.

=== Just Transitions ===
In 2013/14 several state networks set up working groups to discuss and self-educate around just transitions. From 2014 onwards ASEN members in Victoria have become more active in EarthWorker co-operative and other just transitions projects.

=== Food co-operatives ===
The ASEN food co-op working group connects people interested in food co-operatives, worm farms and community gardens to enable information sharing and joint projects.

=== Germinate ===
Germinate is ASEN's bi-annual publication. It contains news, art, opinion and reviews. Each year a new collective is elected to edit and publish the zine.

=== No Coal No Gas ===
ASEN runs campaigns to stop the expansion of Australia's coal and Coal Seam Gas (CSG) industries, because of their destructive effect on the climate, the land and community health. As of 2015 ASEN members are involved in most anti-coal and anti-gas projects and campaigns in Australia.

=== Climate Justice ===
ASEN runs a loose network of climate justice activists who work on various local or national projects such as Climate Camp, renewable energy campaigns and No New Coal campaigns.

== Structure ==
=== A Network of Environment Collectives ===
ASEN is an Australia-wide network of students active on environmental and social justice issues. ASEN links together a fluctuating group of around 38 university environment collectives and five state-based networks around Australia.

The organisational values held by ASEN are reflected in the membership charter and constitution.

=== ASEN Conveners ===
The ASEN National Convener is responsible for convening the national student environment network, assisting campus environment collectives, and facilitating ASEN's national campaigns.

Past National Convener of ASEN are:

- 2019 – Tadhg Porter-Cameron (Adelaide), Lara Wiesel (Melbourne), Ruaela Rusch (Brisbane)
- 2018 – Joey Matchett (Sydney Uni), Anisa Rogers (Melbourne), Ruby-Rose Hampton (Sydney-based)
- 2017 – Callista Barritt (Sydney-based), Cameron Villani (Melbourne-based)
- 2016 – Violet Avena (Sydney Uni), Lizzie Taylor (UTas)(resigned from position mid-year),
- 2015 – Nic Carson (RMIT/Melbourne Polytechnic), Ashey Kaden (LaTrobe)
- 2014 – Alana West (UTS)
- 2013 – Sally Stuart (Sydney Uni), Jason Ray (UTS)
- 2012 – Sean Munro (ANU), Finance Officer: Tom McMurchy (Macquarie), Membership: Raf Fantasia (Uni of Western Sydney)
- 2011 – Jarred Sferruzzi (Flinders University), Finance Officer: Miriam Jones (Sydney Uni), Membership: Mark Cachia (Macquarie)
- 2010 – Peta Page (Adelaide), Grace Pullen (Perth), Steve Skitmore (Brisbane), Celia Vagg (Sydney)
- 2009 – Dany Boulos** (Newcastle), Lian Sinclair (UWA), Kristy Walters (Uni of Queensland)
- 2008 – Matt Allen (Adelaide), Jarra Hicks (Newcastle), Kathryn Ticehurst (Sydney)
- 2007 – Nicky Ison (UNSW)
- 2006 – Holly Creenaune (UTS)
- 2005 – Anna Rose (Sydney Uni)**
- 2004 – Bek Hamed (ANU)**
- 2003 – Eli Greig (Monash) & Bonnie Rivendell (LaTrobe)**
- 2002 – Matt Skellern (Sydney Uni)**
- 2001 – Peter Zakrzewski (COFA)**
- 2000 – Mat Hines (UTas – Hobart)**
- 1999 – Scott Alderson (UQ)**
- 1998 – Chris Heppel (Macquarie)**
- 1997 – Matt Fagan (SCU – Lismore)**

** Simultaneously held the position of National Environment Officer of the National Union of Students of Australia.

Note: Before 2003, the National Environment Officer of the National Union of Students automatically became the National Coordinator of ASEN. In 2003, direct election of National Coordinators by ASEN itself was introduced (Bonnie Rivendell also happened to have been elected to the NUS position, but Eli Greig had not been). This practice lapsed in 2004, but was resurrected, hopefully permanently, for 2006 with the election of Holly Creenaune as ASEN National Coordinator, and Danya Bryx (also an active ASEN participant) as NUS National Environment Officer.

== History ==
The idea of creating a network of the Australian student movement was first endorsed at the resolutions plenary of the 1996 Students and Sustainability conference in Lismore. The next year, at Students and Sustainability in Townsville (1997), an extensive series of motions were passed at the resolutions session establishing the Australian Student Environment Network. It was inspired by the rise of state-based cross-campus student environment networks, which has always existed but which were revitalised with the creation of the NSW Student Environment Activist Network (SEAN) around 1995 and Queensland SEAN around the same time.

The 1997 S&S resolutions provided for campus environment collectives to 'affiliate' to ASEN. This process never really got off the ground, and since then ASEN has generally been conceived as a loose network consisting of the entire actually existing student environment movement – encompassing all campus collectives and state networks, with the annual mid-year Students of Sustainability conference as its highest decision-making body. Every SoS there was usually one or two 'ASEN' meetings where people tried to get the national network more organised. In 1997, numerous ASEN campaign email lists were established; few of these ever became active discussion forums.

An ASEN website was established in 1998 by the NUS National Environment Officer Chris Heppel, with the assistance of Simon Brown. It was updated for the next couple of years, before falling into disuse, except as a site to host the websites for various S&S conferences. It was resurrected in 2004 by Mike Cebon and has been a useful portal of information ever since.

In 2002, there was a concerted effort to re-establish ASEN, which culminated in a national ASEN gathering in January 2003 at the Aboriginal Tent Embassy in Canberra. At this meeting, ASEN National Coordinators (Bonnie Rivendell and Eli Greig) were directly elected by the network for the first time. Many proposals for renewing ASEN were put forward, including by Matt Skellern and also by Daniel Beaver, a prominent Novocastrian forest activist. Several ASEN campaign working groups were established at the January 2003 meeting.

At the 2004 SoS held at Latrobe Bundoora University, a cross-campus group of Victorian and NSW students including Mike Cebon, Anne O'Brien and Arius Tolstoshev initiated a series of meetings about ASEN's structure, purpose and membership. Over the next two years these discussions evolved into a constitution for the network and in June 2006 the registration of ASEN as an incorporated organisation.

== ASEN and NUS ==
An issue that has plagued ASEN from the outset has been its relationship to the National Union of Students (NUS). The National Environment Officer (NEO) of NUS was created in 1995 as a result of the efforts of a faction called the Non-Aligned Left (NAL). At the time, ALP students from both the left and right factions were reluctant to be too vocal in opposing the activities of the federal Labor government. Consequently, the NAL came to be the dominant force on many campuses; by 1995 it controlled the NUS NSW branch, was influential in the Victorian and Queensland branches, and had successfully pushed for the creation of state and national NUS environment officer positions. This fostered the idea amongst student environmental activists that ASEN could be established with a very close relationship to NUS. Consequently, the 1997 resolutions establishing ASEN stated that the ASEN Secretariat would be the NUS National Environment Department. Since the National Environment Department consisted of nothing other than the NEO, this meant that the NEO was, by default, the National Coordinator of ASEN.

This arrangement created several problems. The NEO was an officer of NUS and therefore technically directed by the NUS National Executive and not by the student environment movement; moreover, the NEO position was appointed through NUS's electoral processes rather than through a democratic decision of ASEN. Nevertheless, these problems were not too serious so long as the NEO happened to come from the grassroots and have a commitment to taking direction in practice from ASEN. This was the case until 2001, when a member of the Democrats with no background in the environment movement, was elected as the NEO. This experience, combined with decreasing support by the NUS leadership for the activities and very existence of the NUS Environment Department, led in 2002 to a renewed push to constitute ASEN with its own decision-making and electoral processes independent of NUS.

The issue of ASEN's relationship to NUS has been debated a lot within the network. At the end of 2005 it was proposed that ASEN should be officially recognised by NUS as the national environment department. This was rejected by NUS. In 2006 NUS Environment Officer and ASEN National Convenor were separated into two distinct positions. After 2017, the position of NUS Environment Officer was abolished entirely.
