= Anna Rose =

Australian author, activist and environmentalist

- Born: 14 April 1983 (age 43); Newcastle, NSW
- Education: University of Sydney
- Occupations: Author and environmentalist
- Known for: Co-founded the Australian Youth Climate Coalition
- Spouse: Simon Sheikh
- Website: www.annarose.net.au

Anna Rose (born 14 April 1983) is an Australian author, activist and environmentalist. She co-founded the Australian Youth Climate Coalition (AYCC) in late 2006 with Amanda McKenzie. In 2012 she co-starred in an ABC documentary, I Can Change Your Mind on Climate Change and released her first full-length book, Madlands: A Journey to Change the Mind of a Climate Sceptic. Rose is the founder and CEO of Environment Leadership Australia, a not-for-profit, non-partisan organisation championing community and political leadership on climate change. She sits on the Board of Directors of Farmers for Climate Action, is a Governor of WWF-Australia, an advisory board member for Australian Geographic Society, and a former Myer Foundation Innovation Fellow.

== Early life and education ==
Rose was born in Newcastle, NSW, and graduated from Merewether High School in 2001. She won a scholarship with Distinction to the University of Sydney and graduated in 2008 with degrees in law (1st class honours) and Arts. During her studies, she was part of the Department of Geography's South East Asian field school along the Mekong Delta, and in her final year she went on exchange to Cornell University in upstate New York. Rose received the Young Alumni Award for Achievement in 2009.

== Career ==
=== Student activism ===
Rose was elected Environment Officer of the Students Representative Council and was spokesperson for the organisation Sustainability at Sydney University. In 2005 and 2006 she helped to lead a student campaign for the university to take action to reduce carbon emissions.

In 2004, Rose was elected an editor of Honi Soit, the weekly student newspaper. In 2005 Rose deferred her studies for a year upon election as National Environment Officer for the National Union of Students as a member of the Australian Student Environment Network. At the end of 2005 Rose was selected to attend the United Nations Kyoto Protocol climate change negotiations in Montreal.

In 2007, Rose went on exchange to Cornell Law School and while living in the United States represented young Australians at the Secretary General's Special Conference on Climate Change at the United Nations in New York on 24 September.

=== Australian Youth Climate Coalition ===
In 2006, Rose founded the Australian Youth Climate Coalition by bringing together representatives from all major Australian youth-run organisations in Melbourne for a three-day founding summit. Rose was AYCC's first national director, studying law while starting up the new organisation. After she returned from the United States, Amanda McKenzie and Rose shared the leadership of the organisation as co-directors.

Rose's early work with the AYCC included setting up organisational fundamentals, growing membership, and representing the organisation in the media and at public events. For example, she spoke alongside the Dalai Lama at Perth's Burswood Dome.

Rose was instrumental in two Australian Youth Climate Coalition projects in 2009. Power Shift, Australia's first youth climate summit, brought together 1500 of the AYCC's most active members together at the University of Western Sydney for three days of training and workshops in campaigning and grassroots organising. The final day culminated in a flash mob dance on the steps of the Sydney Opera House.

In December 2009, Rose helped lead a delegation of young Australians and Pacific islanders to the United Nations climate change conference in Copenhagen.

=== Consultant and freelance writer ===
In 2009, Rose wrote a chapter on environment and sustainability for the book The Future, By Us published by Hardie Grant Books. Rose has published articles in The Age, the Sydney Morning Herald, The Australian, Vogue Australia and other publications.

In 2012, Rose appeared on the ABC Television documentary I Can Change Your Mind About... Climate.

==== Madlands: A Journey to Change the Mind of A Climate Sceptic ====
In 2012, Melbourne University Press published Rose's book Madlands: A Journey to Change the Mind of a Climate Sceptic. The book is the story of Rose's efforts to change the mind of former Finance Minister Nick Minchin on the science of climate change.

The book received favourable reviews by authors Bill McKibben and Peter FitzSimons, scientists Tim Flannery and Matthew England, former leader of the Liberal Party John Hewson, CEO of World Vision Australia Tim Costello, and lead singer of the Australian band Blue King Brown, Natalie Pa'apa'a.

Later in 2012, Rose also toured the book around Australia on the 'Madlands Book Tour', visiting over 50 towns and cities around Australia.

=== Academic ===
Rose was a course convenor and lecturer at the Australian National University, for the undergraduate course 'Leadership & Influence'. 'Leadership & Influence' is one of three Vice Chancellor's Courses, which are high-level, inter-disciplinary subjects involving active discovery and research.

Rose is currently an Associate with the Melbourne University Sustainable Societies Institute.

=== Farmers for Climate Action ===
Rose is on the board of Farmers for Climate Action, a movement of farmers and agricultural leaders putting farmers at the centre of climate solutions behind and beyond the farm gate.

=== Groundswell ===
Rose is a co-founder of Australia's first climate advocacy-focused giving circle, Groundswell.

=== Environmental Leadership Australia ===
Rose is the founder and CEO of Environment Leadership Australia, a not-for-profit, non-partisan organisation championing community and political leadership on climate change.

== Awards and honours ==
Rose's awards and honours include:

- 2007–2008 – International Youth Foundation Fellowship
- 2008 – Delegate, Prime Minister's Australia 2020 Summit
- 2008–2009 – Australian Leadership Award from the Australian Davos Connection
- 2009 – University of Sydney Young Alumni Award for Achievement
- 2010 – Sydney Morning Herald '100 Most Influential Sydneysiders'
- 2010 – Sierra Club Earthcare Award for International Environmental Protection
- 2011 – Sydney Morning Herald '50 Most Powerful People in NSW'
- 2011 – The Australian/ IBM Expert Contributor, Shaping Our Future Series
- 2014 – Australian Geographic Society's Conservationist of the Year
- 2015 – ACT Australian of the Year Nominee
- 2019 – AFR Woman of Influence

== Publications ==
- Madlands, a journey into the climate fight, 2012, Melbourne University Press

== See also ==
- Climate change in literature
- Climate change in Australia
