= Ronald Horan =

Australian linguist, educator and author

Ronald Stephen Horan (27 August 1924 – 7 September 1999) was an Australian linguist, educator and author for over forty years. He was the author of language course texts in three languages, both on his own and with two co-authors. He was later in his life a historian, particularly of Fort Street High School in Sydney, Australia. Horan was posthumously awarded the Medal of the Order of Australia in 2000, and in 2001 an annual award in French studies was established in his honour, "the Ron Horan Prize for French", through the Faculty of Arts at Sydney University.

== Education and early career ==
Ron Horan was born in Sydney, and had his secondary education at Fort Street Boys' High School just before and in the early years of the Second World War. He then entered the Faculty of Arts at the University of Sydney but he interrupted his studies to serve in the Royal Australian Air Force (RAAF) for three years as a radar operator and finally trained as an officer and translator. After the war he completed his Bachelor of Arts (BA) degree, majoring in French (Honours) and German. He later gained a Diploma in Education. After a short appointment at Sydney Boys' High School, his "country service", he joined the staff of Fort Street, where he taught for 36 years. Many of those years were spent as modern languages master and he later became deputy principal. His teaching subjects were French, German and English.

As a practical guide for students he compiled the Fort Street Speller, which is presented to all pupils upon their arrival at the school. This guide has made its way into many avenues of public administration.

Ron Horan has also been actively involved in the broader sphere of education. He served for ten years as a teacher and deputy principal at Eastwood Evening College and then a further 22 years as its principal. With co-authors, he has published French and German language course books, which are widely used in Australia and around the world.

== Books ==
Horan was an author of language textbooks which have been popular in Australia and abroad for decades.

With John Wheeler, he co-authored Senior French in two volumes, first published in 1961, later to become A New French Course, in five volumes, that is still a standard in school education and the University of the Third Age. This junior to senior French textbook chronicled the life of the Ravel family and is still in print. Later, with John Slinn, he co-authored A New German Course in two parts. And still later, after his retirement, Horan wrote the English Series, an exploration of the English language for all learners comprising Spelling English, Exploring English and Using English. This series is in its second edition in hard copy and new e-book format.

In the mid 1960s, in co-operation with the Phillips Corporation, he built one of the first Language Laboratories in the world at Fort Street. He also recorded vinyl disc, magnetic tape and cassette recordings to accompany these resources.

Horan served on many education committees, and was president of the Australian Federation of Modern Language Teachers Associations (AFMLTA).

After he had retired he wrote books about the school with Fort Street, the School (1989) being followed by Maroon and Silver (1999).

== Awards and recognition ==
In honour of his work with these students and in regard to the history of the school in general, in 2007 the Ron Horan History Room was inaugurated by the 1955 year students.

In 1949 Ron Horan married Elmire and they had two sons, Rodney and David. The family lived in the Hills area of Sydney.

Ron was posthumously awarded the OAM

In 2000, and in 2001 an annual award was established in his honour in French studies the Ron Horan Prize for French through the Faculty of Arts at Sydney University.

== Publications ==
Senior French

- Senior French Part 1 R S Horan & J R Wheeler ©1961,1963
- Senior French Part 2 R S Horan & J R Wheeler ©1962

French Course

- A New French Course Part 1 R S Horan & J R Wheeler ©1963–1985
- A New French Course Part 2 R S Horan & J R Wheeler ©1964–1987
- A New French Course Part 3 R S Horan & J R Wheeler ©1966–1985
- A New French Course Part 4 R S Horan & J R Wheeler ©1967–1988
- A New French Course Part 5 R S Horan & J R Wheeler ©1969–1988
- A Basic French Vocabulary R S Horan & J R Wheeler ©1970,1986

German Course

- A New German Course Part 1 R S Horan & J S Slinn ©1983
- A New German Course Part 2 R S Horan & J S Slinn ©1987

English Course

- Spelling English R S Horan ©1991, 2006 edited by R Horan & D Horan
- Exploring English R S Horan ©1996, 2006 edited by R Horan & D Horan
- Using English R S Horan ©1996, 2006 edited by R Horan & D Horan
- Using English Workbook A Questions R S Horan ©2006 edited by R Horan & D Horan
- Using English Workbook A Answers R S Horan ©2006 edited by R Horan & D Horan
- Using English Workbook B Questions R S Horan ©2006 edited by R Horan & D Horan
- Using English Workbook C Questions R S Horan ©2006 edited by R Horan & D Horan
- Using English Workbook D Questions R S Horan ©2006 edited by R Horan & D Horan

N.B. All of the above Books are now available through HoranBooks.com Language Learning System Specialists™ in the Amazon Kindle store - in eBook as well as Print-on-demand Paperback and Hard Cover.

Audio Files - Horan Mobile Language Lab™ - available in Apple App Store / Googlle Play Store. Programs available:

- A New French Course Part 1 R S Horan & J R Wheeler ©1963–1985
- A New German Course Part 1 R S Horan & J S Slinn ©1983

Fort Street Books

- Maroon & Silver R S Horan ©1999
- Fort Street, the School R S Horan ©1989
- Fort Street in Verse R S Horan ©1999
- Fort Street Speller R S Horan ©1991
- Fort Street Songster R S Horan ©1985

- History of the Eastwood Evening College R S Horan ©1977
