= Australian Federation of Modern Language Teachers Associations =

The Australian Federation of Modern Language Teachers Associations (AFMLTA) is the national professional body representing teachers of all languages in Australia.

All Australian states have a language teacher association under the umbrella of the AFMLTA. Membership of any one of them includes the benefits of the Australian body. Other associations may affiliate with the AFMLTA under conditions outlined in the constitution.

The term ‘modern’ is used for historical reasons and is not intended to exclude any language. The AFMLTA believes that there is value in all language learning and is accordingly interested in promoting the teaching and learning of any language (ancient, modern, ‘community’, Aboriginal, traditional, international, European, Asian or other).

== Role and functions ==
The role of the AFMLTA is to promote language learning in Australia. This role is realised through providing a national voice on language learning and language teaching in Australia, compiling and distributing information on languages, language learning and language teaching as well as to help develop the professional consciousness of language teachers throughout the country.

== Main activities ==
- Provides professional leadership and advisory services at the national level.
- Tries to influence decisions made at the national level by lobbying, advising, and preparing submissions to politicians, committees of inquiry, government departments, industry and commerce, and wherever else appropriate.
- Encourages the professional development of language teachers through national conferences and workshops, especially the Biennial National Languages Conference.
- Publishes the national language teaching journal Babel.

== Procedures ==
The AFMLTA Constitution indicates that its role and functions are carried out in the following way:

=== Providing a national voice ===
- By making relevant public statements in letters and statements to the press and media and by personal representation.
- By responding to public statements and actions of politicians, education authorities and others when language learning and language teaching are directly or indirectly at issue.
- By initiating or seeking to initiate public debate or the consideration by relevant authorities of issues pertinent to language learning and language teaching.
- By preparing or sponsoring the preparation of submissions on language learning and language teaching to appropriate authorities
- By distributing such statements as referred to above as widely as possible

=== Compiling and distributing information ===
- By maintaining a directory of ‘contact’ people and their areas of expertise.
- By referring people seeking assistance or information to relevant contact persons.
- By keeping the members informed about AFMLTA Inc. activities.
- By collating items of national interest and distributing them through the AFMLTA Inc. website.
- By maintaining files of information on language learning and language teaching.

=== Developing professional consciousness ===
- By encouraging teachers’ awareness of current developments in language teaching and the language sciences.
- By encouraging teachers’ awareness of their profession, its worldwide nature, its worth and status, and their sense of belonging to it.
- By encouraging teachers to increase their knowledge and expertise and their facility in successful classroom techniques.
- By sponsoring research of practical significance.
- By encouraging scholarships and awards to be offered to language teachers and by assisting in selecting suitable applicants.

== Structures ==
The governing bodies of the AFMLTA are described below:

- The National Assembly meets annually and consists of delegates from all member associations and the Executive. It is the supreme governing body of the Federation.
- The Executive and office bearers meet at least twice a year between Assemblies and consist of the President, President-Elect, Immediate Past President, Vice President, Secretary, Treasurer, Editor of Babel, Information Officer and Promotions Officer. The Executive is responsible for running the Federation between Assemblies.
- The Public Relations Group consists of the President, Vice President, Immediate Past President and President Elect who are empowered to speak in the name of the Federation. Its task is to respond publicly on behalf of the AFMLTA to issues involving languages, language learning and language teaching.
- The Babel Editorial Committee consists of the Editor assisted by such other members as are needed. This Committee produces Babel, solicits articles, sponsorship and advertising, and supervises all stages of its printing and distribution.

The AFMLTA consists of eight member Associations in all Australian States and Territories.

Other associations may affiliate with the AFMLTA under conditions outlined in the constitution.

The AFMLTA is affiliated with the internationally recognised language teaching association, the Fédération Internationale des Professeurs de Langues Vivantes (FIPLV) and actively participates in its work.

The AFMLTA also has strong associations with the New Zealand Association of Language Teachers (NZALT).

== See also ==
Ronald Horan was a past president of AFMLTA.
