= Simon Sheikh =

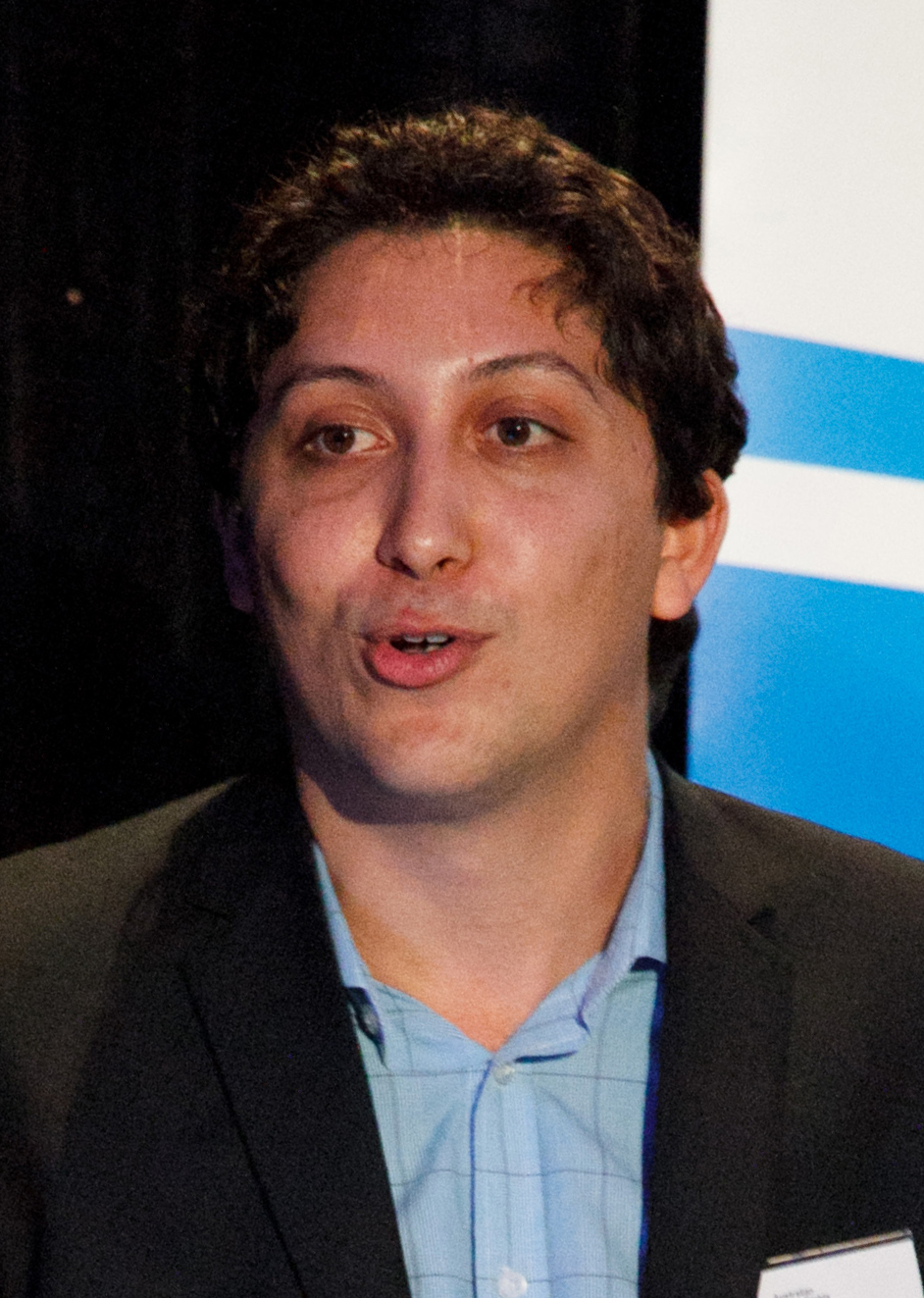
- Sheikh in 2010
- Born: 1986 (age 39–40); Sydney, NSW
- Education: University of New South Wales Fort Street High School
- Occupation: Community campaigner
- Known for: Former National Director of GetUp!
- Spouse: Anna Rose

Simon Sheikh (born 1986) is an Australian activist who is currently CEO of superannuation fund Future Super. He was the National Director of GetUp! from 2008 to 2012. He was a delegate to the economics stream of the Australia 2020 Summit and was named the New South Wales Young Professional of the Year in 2007.

== Education and career ==
He was born in Sydney, and has ancestry from India, Pakistan, Britain, New Zealand and Australia.

He is the son of Michael Sheikh, an Indian-born Pakistani industrial chemist and inventor and British New Zealander, Rhonda Badham. He attended Camdenville Public School and later gained entry to Fort Street High School. He later studied economics at the University of New South Wales, while working full-time in the Services Marketing team at Telstra and as a public servant at the NSW Treasury.

Sheikh represented Australia as the youth representative at the Commonwealth Heads of Government Meeting in Uganda in 2007.

In 2009 he was part of the Sydney Leadership Program run by Social Leadership Australia at The Benevolent Society.

=== GetUp! ===
He became National Director of GetUp! in September, 2008, at the age of 22.

He stepped down from being National Director of GetUp! on 27 July 2012, stating that he intended to avoid burnout. GetUp! claims its membership increased from 270,000 to 610,000 during his four-year term. 80,000 people donated to GetUp! in the 12 months up to July 2012. He is succeeded as director by Sam McLean.

=== Future Super ===
Sheikh is managing director of Future Super, an ethical superfund, which he co-founded with Adam Verwey.

== Political career ==
Sheikh was a financial member of the Australian Labor Party for two years from 2004 to 2006.

In 2013, Sheikh unsuccessfully stood as a candidate for the Australian Greens seeking election to the Senate representing the Australian Capital Territory.

== Personal life ==
In November 2011, Sheikh married Australian climate activist Anna Rose.
