= Daniel Spencer (environmentalist) =

Australian environmentalist

Daniel Spencer (born c. 1990) is an Australian climate activist and musician. He has been a prominent member of the Australian Youth Climate Coalition.

== Early life and education ==
Spencer was born around 1990. He is originally from Renmark in the southern Riverland region of South Australia,

He grew up in Adelaide, in the suburb of Craigburn Farm. In year 12 at school, he led the initiative to create a school environmental group with a focus on climate change. The group organised events and fundraisers, including a climate change awareness week.

He studied music at university, but left his studies in 2010 to join the Australian Youth Climate Coalition (AYCC).

== Career ==
Spencer has held prominent leadership roles in the AYCC. In 2010, he was part of an AYCC delegation attending United Nations climate talks in Mexico, where he organised a youth-based action to bring awareness to the thousands of deaths caused by climate change each year.

In 2011, he became the South Australian state coordinator for AYCC, and became involved in the "Re-power Port Augusta" campaign, which included the Walk for Solar. Much of his early work focused on promoting a vision and building community support for the replacement of the coal-fired power stations at Port Augusta with a concentrated solar-thermal power generation alternative. In 2012, he participated in the Walk for Solar event, in which 100 people walked from Port Augusta to Adelaide, a distance of around 330 km (210 mi), to raise awareness.

He has also worked with young people across Australia who have been campaigning to protect the Great Barrier Reef from the expansion of the coal industry, for renewable energy, and more action on combating climate change.

In 2016, Spencer appeared at WOMADelaide.

In 2018 he was appointed to a leading position relating to energy at the Australian Services Union. As of 2023, Spencer is a member of the Premier's Climate Change Council members, chaired by Martin Haese. The primary role of the Council, which was created in 2008, is to provide independent advice to the Minister for Environment and Water on reducing greenhouse gas emissions and adapting to climate change.

== Recognition ==
In 2012, Spencer received the Bob Brown Foundation's inaugural Young Environmentalist of the Year award.

Also in 2012, he was recognised by the Conservation Council of South Australia with the Jill Hudson Award for Environmental Protection.

In 2013, he received the Flinders Ports Environment Award at the Channel 9 Young Achievers Awards in South Australia.

== Other activities ==
Spencer is also a musician, and was songwriter and lead singer for the roots reggae band Babylon Burning as of 2014.
