= The Otesha Project =

Canadian non-profit promoting social and environmental sustainability among young people

- Founded: 2002
- Founders: Jocelyn Land-Murphy, Jessica Lax
- Defunct: 31 December 2015
- Type: Non-profit organization
- Purpose: Social and environmental sustainability, youth education
- Headquarters: Canada
- Region served: Canada, United Kingdom, Australia
- Methods: Bicycle tours, theatre, workshops, publications

The Otesha Project was a Canadian non-profit that promoted social and environmental sustainability among young people. Founded in 2002, the organization disbanded on December 31, 2015. At one point, the project had affiliates in the United Kingdom and Australia.

Otesha used theatre, workshops, cycling tours, and publications. They claimed to have worked with over 150,000 Canadians and trained over 500 sustainability advocates.

== History ==
Otesha was founded in 2002 by Jocelyn Land-Murphy and Jessica Lax. While studying sustainable development in Kenya, the two women witnessed the disparity between lifestyles enjoyed by many in North America versus those of many Kenyans. They were disturbed by the relative excess of wealth and consumption among North Americans,

The two women then started the Otesha Project – “otesha” is a Swahili word which translates as “reason to dream”. In October 2003, they launched the first, transcontinental Otesha bicycle tour in Canada. During this tour, participants delivered 250 presentations to over 12,000 people.

On December 31, 2015, Otesha announced that it was shutting down due to lack of funding.

== Programs ==
=== Presentations ===
Otesha used theatre, multi-media, storytelling, motivational speaking, games, facilitation tools and workshops to teach about sustainability. Facilitators would run sessions with 30 participants, running activities and encouraging participants to use their own experience to problem-solve. .

=== Bicycle Tours ===
Every year, Otesha ran several bicycle tours throughout Canada. Tours ranged in length from 9 days to 2 months and typically had between 12 and 18 tour members. The groups strived to live as sustainably as possible while on tour. Tour life was largely self-directed; decisions are made by consensus. Each tour member played a role in determining what types of food the group will and will not eat, how they will limit their water consumption, etc. Tour members were responsible for fundraising to cover the tour costs.

=== Triple H Program ===
Otesha put on presentations as a part of their Hopeful High school Hooligan (Triple-H) program. This project brings together teams of 10-15 high school students to learn, and present, The Otesha 'Choices' play to their own schools. Presentations were made to over 9,000 high school students.

=== The Otesha Book ===
Otesha published The Otesha Book: From Junk to Funk, which contained essays from over a dozen authors on individual actions to further sustainability.

=== International Chapters ===
The Otesha international affiliates included Otesha UK, O.P.E.N. (Otesha Pan European Network), and Otesha (Australia). Each organization offered cycling tours, workshops, experiential learning and training for youth to become sustainability advocates.

The UK organisation used interns to promote imports to the UK from countries that had no comparable social insurance system, and so contributed to the high unemployment of garment workers in the Tower Hamlets area where Otesha shared a subsidised office with similar organisations that have also since closed. "Like often criticised unpaid internships", that Otesha managed for PR to promote imported products "unintentionally reinforcing the same social divides we were trying to undo – increasing division between people who had the privilege to do these things, and those who didn’t." None of the clothing and fair trade related organisations advocated social insurance systems in Africa, India or the far east. The group of related organisations (Ethical Fashion bloggers, Ethical Fashion Forum, Pants to Poverty) lost their subsidised office space about the same time, after a political change in Tower Hamlets, and most then closed.
