= Future Super =

Australian superannuation fund

FutureSuper
- Type: Retail Superannuation Fund, for-profit
- Industry: Superannuation
- Founded: 2014
- Headquarters: Sydney, Australia
- Area served: Australia
- Key people: Simon Sheikh, Founder and CEO, Adam Verwey, Founder and MD Future Asset Management, Kirstin Hunter, MD Future Super Services
- Total assets: $A1 Billion
- Website: www.myfuturesuper.com.au

Future Super is an Australian retail superannuation fund that offers superannuation services, focusing on zero fossil fuel investment and on holistically ethical investment with an emphasis on clean energy projects. Established in 2014, Future Super services over 36,000 members Australia-wide and has over $1 Billion in funds under management.

== Retail superannuation fund ==
As a retail super fund, Future Super is a for-profit fund with a multi-layered corporate setup. Future Superannuation Group Pty Ltd is the owner of Responsible Investment Services Pty Ltd (RIS).

== History ==
The Fund was set up by a group of activists headed by former head of GetUp, Simon Sheikh together with ethical investment expert Adam Verwey. At 20 July 2019, the Fund has a pension fund, plus three superannuation investment options, all fossil-free and ethically driven. The three superannuation investment options are: Balanced Index, Renewables Plus Growth and Balanced Impact. Future Super charges a management fee of between 0.785% and 1.5% (as of September 2023), with some options also including a flat fee.

== Fund administration ==
Future Super is the trading name of the Future Superannuation Group Pty Ltd. The Group holds 100% of the ownership of Responsible Investment Services Pty Ltd (RIS). RIS is a Corporate Authorised Representative of Future Super Asset Management Pty Ltd, and as such is responsible for promoting and for providing investment management, communications and member services for the Grosvenor Pirie Master Super Fund 2 (GPMSF-2). The Grosvenor Pirie Master Super Fund 2 is administered by OneVue Super Services Pty Limited.
