= William Wilkins (educator) =

Australian teacher and civil servant

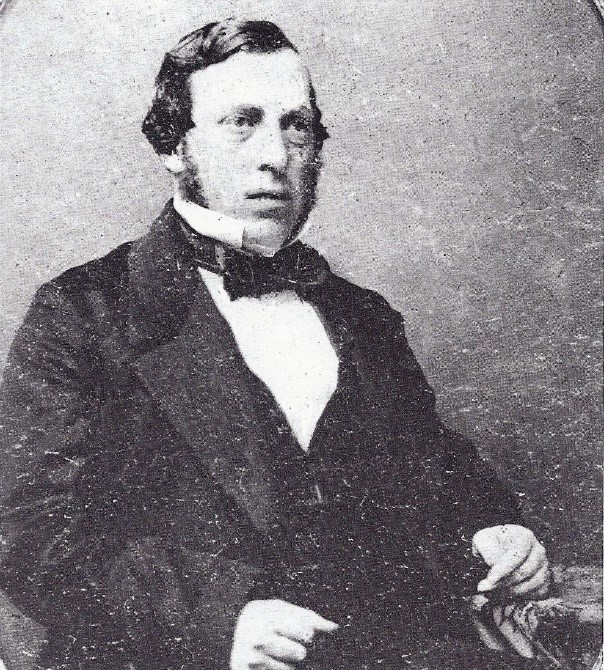
- Half-length photographic portrait
- Born: 16 January 1827; Parish of St Mary, Lambeth, South London
- Died: 10 November 1892 (aged 65); Guildford, New South Wales
- Resting place: Rookwood Cemetery
- Spouse: Ann Sheppard (m. 1850; died 1850) Harriett Bartlett (m. 1852)

William Wilkins (16 January 1827 – 10 November 1892) was an English educationist, civil servant and inspector of schools in the Colony of New South Wales. He was the first headmaster of Fort Street Model School and for some years the Secretary of the Board of National Education.

== England ==
William Wilkins was born on 16 January 1827 in the Workhouse Infirmary, Parish of St Mary, Lambeth, London. He was a son of William Wilkins (died 1830), the parish beadle, by his wife Sarah, née Noice. He was educated for the tutorial profession in the Battersea Training College for teachers, which, under the direction of Dr. Kay, afterwards known as Sir James Kay Shuttleworth, and his successor, attained a high character for efficiency. After leaving the Training College, Wilkins was employed for some years in reformatory industrial, and day schools. While thus engaged, certain regulations of the Committee of Council, commonly described as the "Minutes of 1846", were promulgated. In pursuance of these "minutes" he was summoned with others to the first Government examination of teachers, held under the superintendence of Inspectors Maseley and Thurtell, and his name subsequently appeared amongst the four that took highest place.

== New South Wales ==
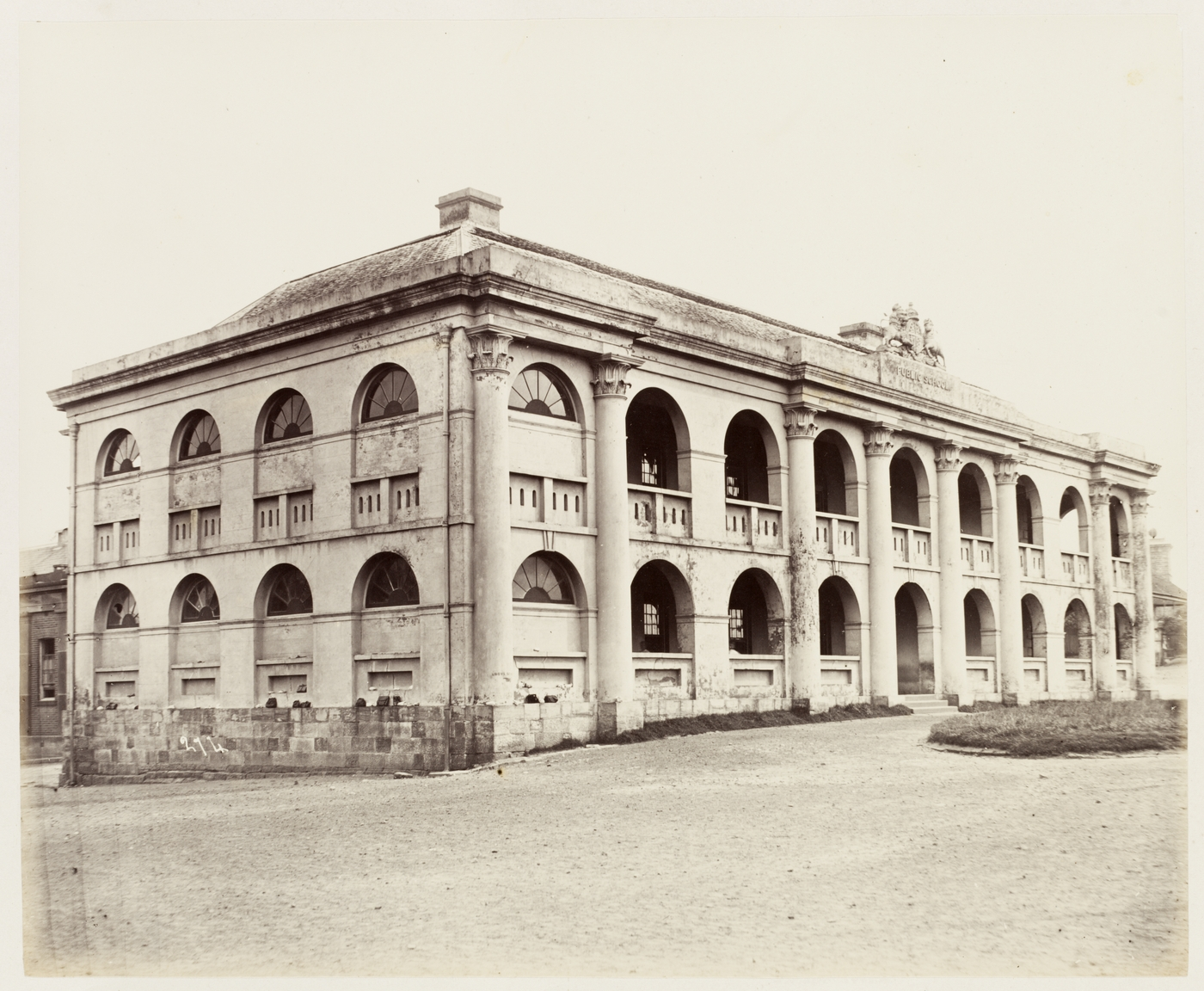
Fort Street Model School, 1872

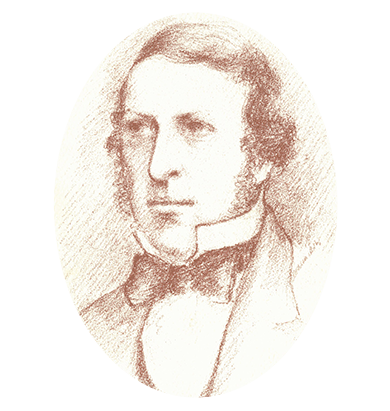
Head-and-shoulders portrait sketch of Wilkins, n.d.

Having in 1849 been recommended by his medical adviser to remove to a warmer and dryer climate, Wilkins chose Now South Wales in preference to several other countries in which situations were offered. He came to the colony early in 1851, having been appointed by Earl Grey to be headmaster of the Model Training School. That nobleman was in great disfavour with the colonists at the time—a circumstance which Wilkins found to be by no means to his advantage. When Wilkins entered upon the charge of the Model School, in January 1851, there were but two or three trained teachers in the colony. The office of teacher itself was held in little respect and the pay attached to it was but £40 a year. The first step towards improvements in these respects was the introduction of the pupil teacher system, by means of which the colony was afterwards provided with great numbers of efficient teachers some of whom rose to high rank in that profession. In March 1874, Wilkins was sent by the National Board (of Education) on a special visit to the schools in the Hunter River district. Two important changes resulted from that visit. A system of examining and classifying teachers with graduated rates of pay according to ability was introduced, and, for the first time in Australia, inspectors of schools were appointed. In the same year Wilkins was appointed one of three commissioners, who were empowered to visit und inspect all the primary schools in the colony that were in receipt of pecuniary assistance from the State. The report of the commissioners disclosed the existence of serious defects in the schools visited, and suggested certain improvements, most of which were from time to time incorporated in the educational system of the colony. In 1857 Wilkins suggested to the National Board of Education the expediency of establishing non-visited schools. The suggestion was adopted, and there followed the largest increases in the number of schools that the colony ever since knew in a given time. Ten years afterwards, in 1867, Wilkins was appointed secretary to the Council of Education.

== Death ==
Wilkins died, following a long illness, at his Guildford home on 10 November 1892, at the age of sixty-five, and was interred in the Anglican section of Rookwood Cemetery; he was survived by his second wife, two sons and three daughters. His estate was valued for probate at £1083.

== Works ==
Wilkins' public lectures on the expansion of the school system were published in 1865 as National Education. He wrote The Geography of New South Wales … (Sydney: J. J. Moore, 1863) and The Geography and History of New South Wales, also published by J. J. Moore, for the instruction of colonial pupils with relevant knowledge of their land, and helped to prepare The Australian Reading Books for the colonial schools. He also supervised and partly edited two monthly publications, Australian Journal of Education, 1868–1870, and Journal of Primary Education, 1871–1873.

== Legacy ==
Wilkins pioneered curriculum improvements, and the growth in the number and quality of schools under his leadership was considerable. He himself once wrote,

The educator who is not on fire with the interest of his subject can but half teach. He must glow and he must kindle. The pupil must catch fire. The cold, impassive, dry, lifeless teacher may have his own reward in pay … He will not find it in interest awakened or minds quickened.

The influence of Wilkins' work at the Fort Street Model School was substantial, forming the basis for education throughout the colonies. In the words of historian Manning Clark,

[A]t the Fort Street National School in Sydney William Wilkins was teaching pupil-teachers how to lead the children of New South Wales out of darkness into the light. He was holding out to them that bright prospect of the day when every locality however remote and every family however humble was supplied with the ameliorating influences of an education, which would teach every man, woman and child in the colony to form the habits of regularity, cleanliness, orderly behaviour, and regard for the rights of both public and private property, as well as the habit of obedience to the law, and respect for duly constituted authority. In Melbourne, Adelaide and Hobart his counterparts were preaching the same gospel of humanity marching forward, reaching upward for the light.

== See also ==
- Education in Australia
