= Leukaemia Foundation =

Australian charity

- Formation: 1975
- Type: Non-governmental organisation
- Legal status: Independent, Operational
- Headquarters: Brisbane, Australia
- Patron: Paul de Jersey AC
- Website: www.leukaemia.org.au

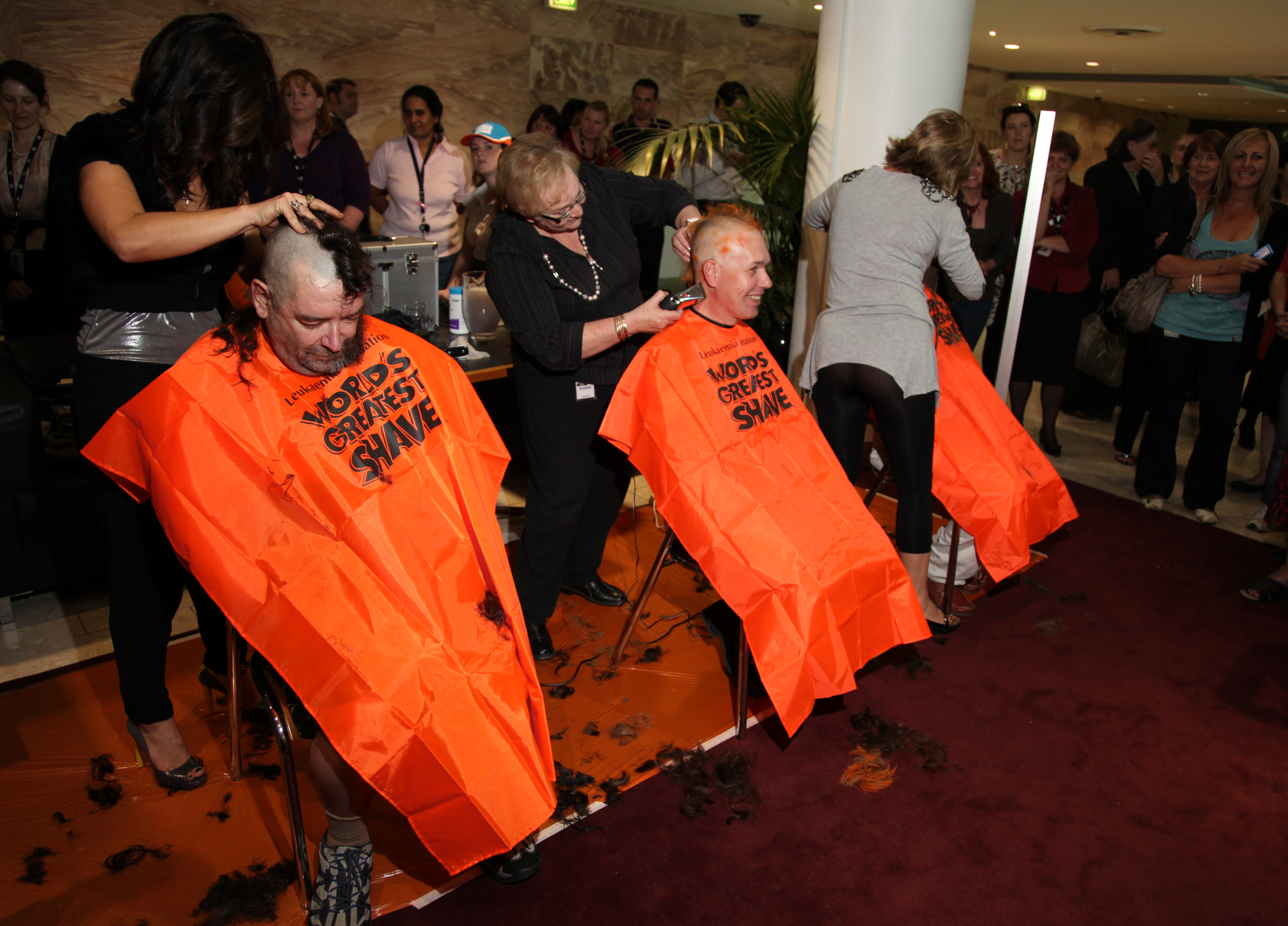
Participants in the World's Greatest Shave have their heads shaved in support of the Leukaemia Foundation.

The Leukaemia Foundation is a national charity in Australia dedicated to helping people who have been diagnosed with leukaemia, lymphoma, myeloma, MDS, MPN, Waldenström's macroglobulinaemia, aplastic anaemia, or amyloidosis.

== History ==
The Leukaemia Foundation was established in Queensland, Australia, in 1975, with the help of haematologist Dr Trevor Olsen and the Holland Park Lions Club. In 1993, the Leukaemia Foundation of Western Australia was formed, followed by the Leukaemia Foundation of New South Wales and South Australian in 1998, then Victoria and Tasmania in 1999. In 2016, the Leukaemia Foundation of Australia and Leukaemia Foundation of Queensland unified to become one national organisation. The Leukaemia Foundation now has offices across Australia.

== Community commitments ==
The charity supports patients and family members by providing free counselling, educational services and accommodation for families who need to relocate while patients receive care.

The Leukaemia Foundation invests millions of dollars per year in blood cancer research aimed at improving treatments and finding a cure. It also provides aid to thousands of Australians each year by offering services like information, emotional support, and advocacy, as well as educational programs to aid patients with blood diseases, safe transportation to and from hospital treatment.

One of the Leukaemia Foundation's fundraising events is the "World's Greatest Shave", in which participants shave, cut or colour their hair and raise funds to support Australians facing blood cancer. Every dollar raised will help provide support services to patients and families and keep them together.
